= M4 Sherman =

World War II era medium tank

Medium Tank, M4
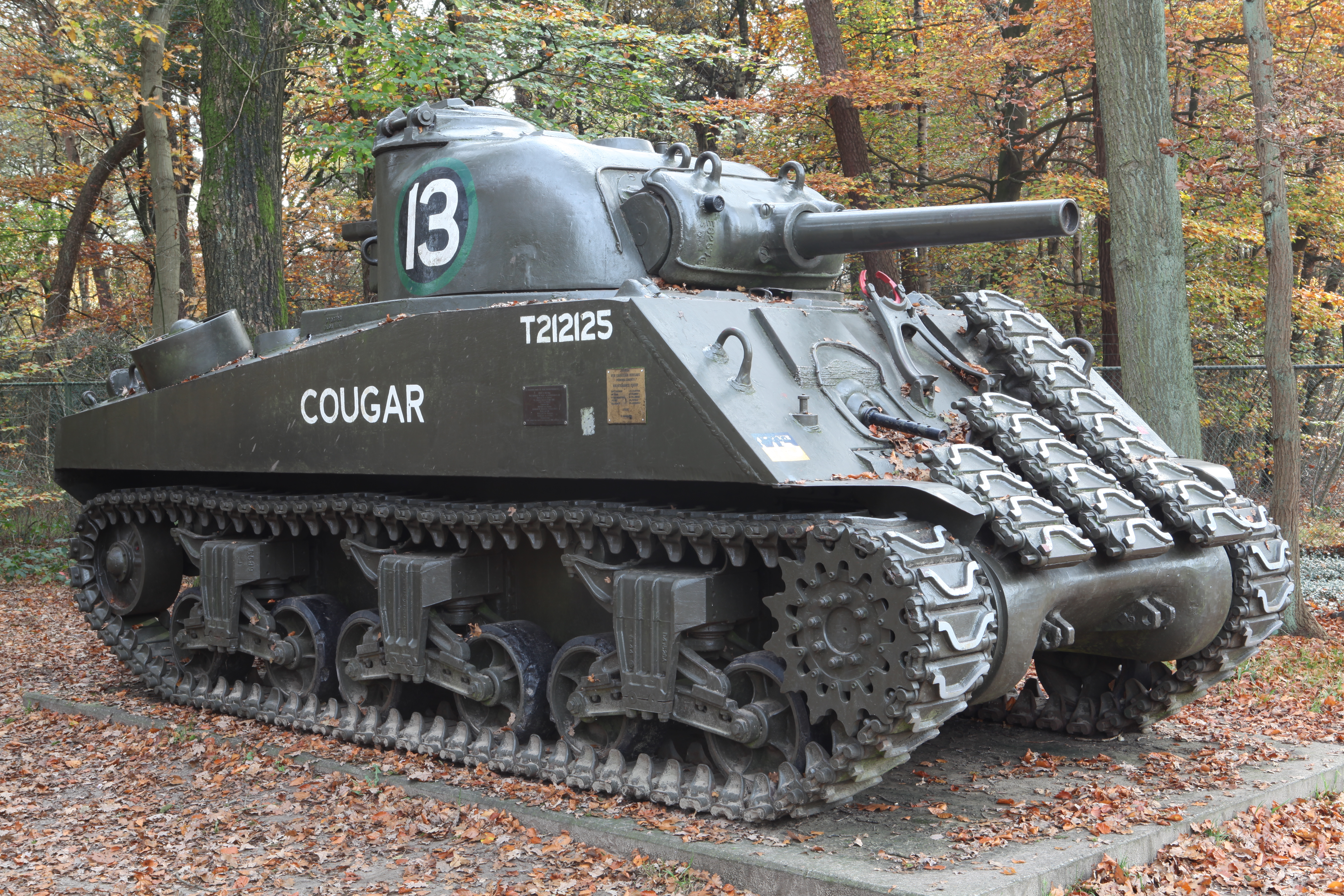
- An M4 (105) Sherman tank with spare track-links welded on its front for additional armor protection, preserved at the Langenberg Liberation Memorial in Ede, Netherlands
- Type: Medium tank
- Place of origin: United States

Service history
- In service: 1942–2018 (Note: Paraguay retired the final three active Shermans from its Presidential Escort Regiment in 2018.); 1942–1957 (United States)
- Used by: United States, and many others (see Foreign variants and use)
- Wars: World War II; Indonesian National Revolution; Greek Civil War; First Indochina War; 1948 Arab–Israeli War; Korean War; Cuban Revolution; Revolución Libertadora; Suez Crisis; 1958 Lebanon crisis; Nicaraguan Revolution; Indo-Pakistani War of 1965; Six-Day War; Indo-Pakistani War of 1971; Yom Kippur War; Lebanese Civil War; Uganda–Tanzania War; Iran–Iraq War

Production history
- Designer: U.S. Army Ordnance Department
- Designed: 1940
- Manufacturer: American Locomotive Company; Baldwin Locomotive Works; Detroit Tank Arsenal; Federal Machine and Welder Company; Fisher Tank Arsenal; Ford Motor Company; Lima Locomotive Works; Pacific Car and Foundry Company; Pressed Steel Car Company; Pullman-Standard Car Company
- Unit cost: $44,556–64,455 in 1945 dollars, depending upon variant ($803,988–$1,163,054 in 2025 dollars) 48,000 man-hours
- Produced: September 1941 (prototype); February 1942 – July 1945
- No. built: 49,234, excluding prototypes
- Variants: See U.S. variants and foreign variants

Specifications
- Mass: 66,800–84,000 lb (33.4–42.0 short tons, 30.3–38.1 tonnes) depending upon variant
- Length: 19 ft 2 in–20 ft 7 in (5.84–6.27 m) depending upon variant
- Width: 8 ft 7 in (2.62 m) to 9 ft 10 in (3.00 m) depending upon variant
- Height: 9 ft 0 in–9 ft 9 in (2.74–2.97 m) depending upon variant
- Crew: 5 (commander, gunner, loader, driver, assistant driver/bow gunner)
- Armor: 12.7 to 177.8 mm (0.50 to 7.00 in) depending on location and variant
- Main armament: 75 mm gun M3 (90–104 rounds) or 76 mm gun M1A1, M1A1C, or M1A2 (71 rounds) or 105 mm howitzer M4 (66 rounds)
- Secondary armament: .50 caliber Browning M2HB machine gun (300–600 rounds), 2 to 4 .30 caliber Browning M1919A4 machine guns (6,000–6,750 rounds) depending on variant
- Engine: M4 and M4A1 model: Continental R975-C1 or -C4 9–cylinder radial gasoline engine 350 or 400 hp (261 or 298 kW) at 2,400 rpm M4A2 model: General Motors 6046 twin inline diesel engine; 375 hp (280 kW) at 2,100 rpm M4A3 model: Ford GAA V8 gasoline engine; 450 hp (336 kW) at 2,600 rpm M4A4 model: Chrysler A57 multibank (30 cylinder) gasoline engine; 370 hp (276 kW) at 2,400 rpm M4A6 model: Caterpillar D-200A (Wright RD-1820) 9 cylinder radial diesel engine; 450 hp (336 kW) at 2,400 rpm
- Power/weight: 10.46–13.49 hp/short ton (8.60–11.09 kW/t) depending upon variant
- Transmission: Spicer manual synchromesh transmission, 5 forward and 1 reverse gears
- Suspension: Vertical volute spring suspension (VVSS) or horizontal volute spring suspension (HVSS)
- Fuel capacity: 138–175 US gal (520–660 L; 115–146 imp gal) depending upon variant
- Operational range: Road: 100–150 miles (160–240 km) depending upon variant Cross-country: 60–100 miles (97–161 km) depending upon variant
- Maximum speed: 22–30 mph (35–48 km/h) on road, 15–20 mph (24–32 km/h) off-road depending upon variant

This gif shows the differences between the M4A1, M4A2, and M4A3 Sherman tanks.

The M4 Sherman, officially Medium Tank, M4, was the medium tank most widely used by the United States and Western Allies in World War II. The M4 Sherman was reliable and well adapted to mass production. Early production models featured direct vision ports, 3-piece bolted transmission covers, and other features that were progressively updated. Tens of thousands were distributed through the Lend-Lease program to the British Commonwealth, Soviet Union, and other Allied Nations. The tank was named by the British after the American Civil War General William Tecumseh Sherman. It was also the basis of several other armored fighting vehicles including self-propelled artillery, tank destroyers, and armored recovery vehicles.

The M4 Sherman tank evolved from the earlier M3 Lee. The M3's unconventional layout and the limitations of its hull-mounted gun prompted the need for a more efficient and versatile design, leading to the development of the M4 Sherman.

The development of the M4 Sherman emphasized key factors such as reliability, ease of production, and standardization. The U.S. Army and the designers prioritized durability and maintenance ease, which ensured the tank could be quickly repaired in the field. A critical aspect of the design process was the standardization of parts, allowing for streamlined production and the efficient supply of replacement components. Additionally, the tank's size and weight were kept within moderate limits, which facilitated easier shipping and compatibility with existing logistical and engineering equipment, including bridges and transport vehicles.

The M4 Sherman became the most-produced American tank of World War II with a total of 49,324 units built, including various specialized variants. The only World War II-era tank to exceed the M4's production numbers was the Soviet T-34, with approximately 84,070 units built.

When the M4 tank first went into combat in North Africa with the British Army at the Second Battle of El Alamein in late 1942, it increased the advantage of Allied armor over Axis armor and was superior to the lighter German and Italian tank designs. Its 75 mm gun and better armor provided an edge over the tanks fielded by Nazi Germany at this time, though by 1944 the M4 was inferior in firepower and armor compared to the increasing numbers of German upgraded medium tanks and heavy tanks (most M4 Shermans kept their dual-purpose 75 mm gun into 1944.) but was able to fight on with the help of considerable numerical superiority, greater mechanical reliability, better logistical support, and fire support from growing numbers of fighter-bombers and artillery pieces. Later in the war, a more effective armor-piercing gun, the 76 mm gun M1, was incorporated into production vehicles. To increase the effectiveness of the Sherman against enemy tanks, the British refitted some Shermans with a 76.2 mm Ordnance QF 17-pounder gun (as the Sherman Firefly).

The M4 Sherman was instrumental in the success of several Allied offensives, particularly after 1942, when the Allies began to gain momentum following the Allied landings in North Africa (Operation Torch) and the subsequent campaigns in Italy and France.

The ability to produce the Sherman in large numbers, combined with its operational flexibility and effectiveness, made it a key component of the Allied war effort. The Sherman's role as the backbone of U.S. armored forces in World War II cemented its legacy as one of the most influential tank designs of the 20th century despite its limitations, such as thinner armor compared to German heavy and medium tanks like the Tiger and Panther.

After World War II, the M4 Sherman, particularly the many improved and upgraded versions, continued to see combat service in many conflicts around the world, including the UN Command forces in the Korean War, with Israel in the Arab–Israeli wars, briefly with South Vietnam in the Vietnam War, and on both sides of the Indo-Pakistani War of 1965. In US service, the M4 was replaced by the heavier M26 Pershing and M46 Patton.

== U.S. prototype ==
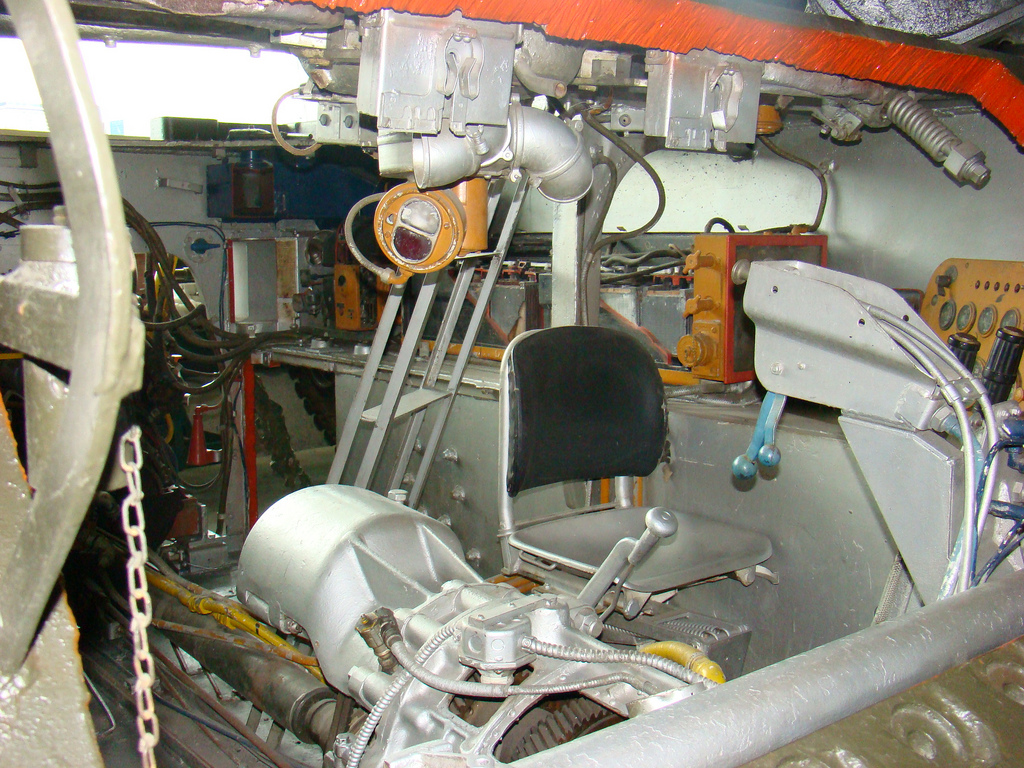
Cutaway Sherman showing transmission and driver's seat

The United States Army Ordnance Department designed the M4 medium tank to replace the M3 medium tank. The M3 was an up-gunned development of the M2 medium tank of 1939, in turn, derived from the M2 light tank of 1935. The M3 was developed as a stopgap measure until a new turret mounting a 75 mm gun could be devised. While it was a big improvement when used by the British in Africa against German forces, the placement of a 37 mm gun turret on top gave it a very high profile, and the unusual side-sponson mounted main gun, with limited traverse, could not be aimed across the other side of the tank. Though reluctant to adopt British weapons into their arsenal, the American designers were ready to accept proven British ideas. These ideas, as embodied in a tank designed by the Canadian General Staff, also influenced the development of the American Sherman tank. Before long American military agencies and designers had accumulated sufficient experience to forge ahead on several points. In the field of tank armament, the American 75 mm and 76 mm dual-purpose tank guns won the acknowledgement of British tank experts. Detailed design characteristics for the M4 was submitted by the Ordnance Department on 31 August 1940, but the development of a prototype was delayed while the production designs of the M3 were finished and the M3 entered full-scale production. On 18 April 1941, the U.S. Armored Force Board chose the simplest of five designs. Known as the T6, the design was a modified M3 hull and chassis, carrying a newly designed turret mounting the M3's 75 mm gun. This would later become the Sherman.

Tank crews fuel up their M‑4 and M‑3 tanks

The Sherman's reliability resulted from features developed for U.S. light tanks during the 1930s, including vertical volute spring suspension, rubber-bushed tracks, and a rear-mounted radial engine with drive sprockets in front.

Barrel mantlet (early) "Rotor Shield" and gunner "Rotor Sight".

The T6 prototype was completed on 2 September 1941. The vehicle's "Turret Indirect Sighting Device" for the gunner, featured an optical periscope locked to the turret rotation, and housed in a turret roof casemate (with an armored shutter that rotated open or closed). Given the synecdoche label "Rotor", 30 (or more) rotor Shermans were produced. The upper hull of the T6 was a single large casting. It featured a single overhead hatch for the driver and escape hatches in the left and right side of the hull. In the later M4A1 production model, this large casting was maintained, although the side hatches were eliminated, and a second overhead hatch was added for the assistant driver. The M34 "Combination Gun Mount" gun shield (D50880) was installed. All M34 production Shermans (until M34A) also had a gun barrel mantlet (D51288: early smooth type or later "Bullet Splash" collar type) that rotated and elevated with the gun barrel, labeled "Rotor Shield" (not to be confused with the gunner's "Rotor Sight"). The modified T6 was standardized as the M4, and first production completed in February 1942. The cast-hull models would later be re-standardized as M4A1, with the first welded-hull models receiving the designation M4. In August 1942, the Detroit Arsenal proposed an experimental turret and hull design, replacing the standard cast turret, with a welded turret featuring a sloped turret face and a welded hull with sloped sides.

=== Doctrine ===
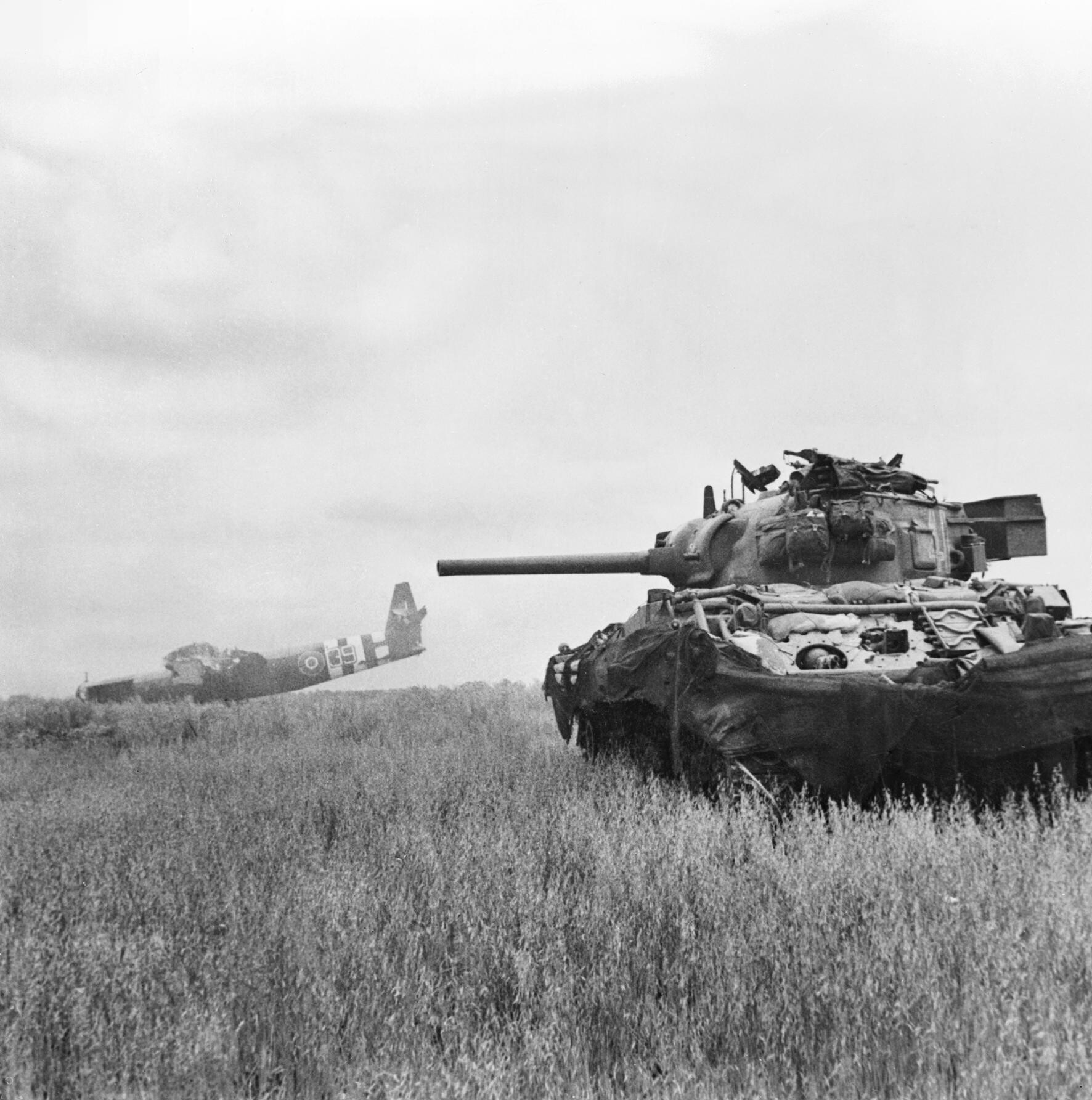
A Sherman DD amphibious tank of 13th/18th Royal Hussars in action against German troops using crashed Airspeed Horsa gliders as cover near Ranville, Operation Overlord, Normandy, 10 June 1944

As the United States approached entry into World War II, armor usage was governed by Field Manual 100–5, Operations (published May 1941, the month after the M4 final design). That manual stated:

The armored division is organized primarily to perform missions that require great mobility and firepower. It is given decisive missions. It is capable of engaging in all forms of combat, but its primary role is in offensive operations against hostile rear areas.

The M4 was, therefore, not intended primarily for infantry support. It placed tanks in the "striking echelon" of the armored division and placed the infantry in the "support echelon", without directing that tanks should only seek to attack other tanks, thus leaving target selection up to the field commander based on what types of targets were available. A field manual covering the use of the Sherman (FM 17–33, "The Tank Battalion, Light and Medium" of September 1942) described fighting enemy tanks, when necessary, as one of the many roles of the Sherman, with a page of text and four diagrams to tank-versus-tank action. This early armored doctrine was heavily influenced by the sweeping early successes of German blitzkrieg tactics. By the time M4s reached combat in significant numbers, battlefield demands for infantry support and tank-versus-tank action far outnumbered the occasional opportunities of rear-echelon attack.

United States doctrine held that the most critical anti-tank work – stopping massed enemy tank attacks – was primarily to be done by towed and self-propelled anti-tank guns, operated by "Tank Destroyer" battalions, with friendly tanks being used in support if possible. Speed was essential to bring the tank destroyers from the rear to destroy incoming tanks. This doctrine was rarely followed in combat, as it was found to be impractical. Commanders were reluctant to leave tank destroyers in reserve; if they were, it was also easier for an opposing armored force to achieve a breakthrough against an American tank battalion, which would not have all of its anti-tank weapons at the front during the beginning of any attack.

== U.S. production history ==
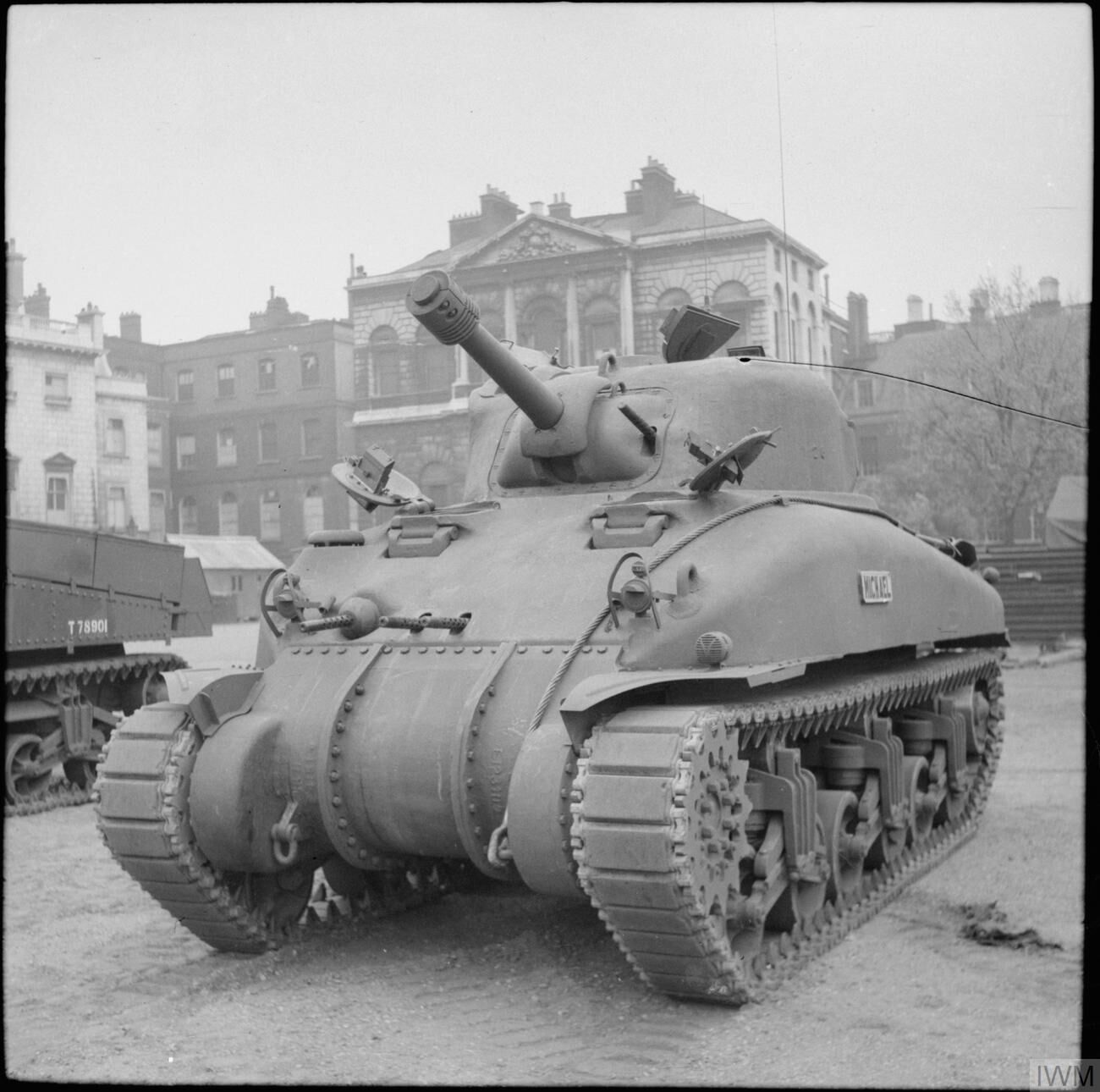
"Michael", the second production Sherman and the first Sherman delivered to the British Army, showing the three hull mounted .30 machine guns; the pair of fixed weapons were soon deleted.

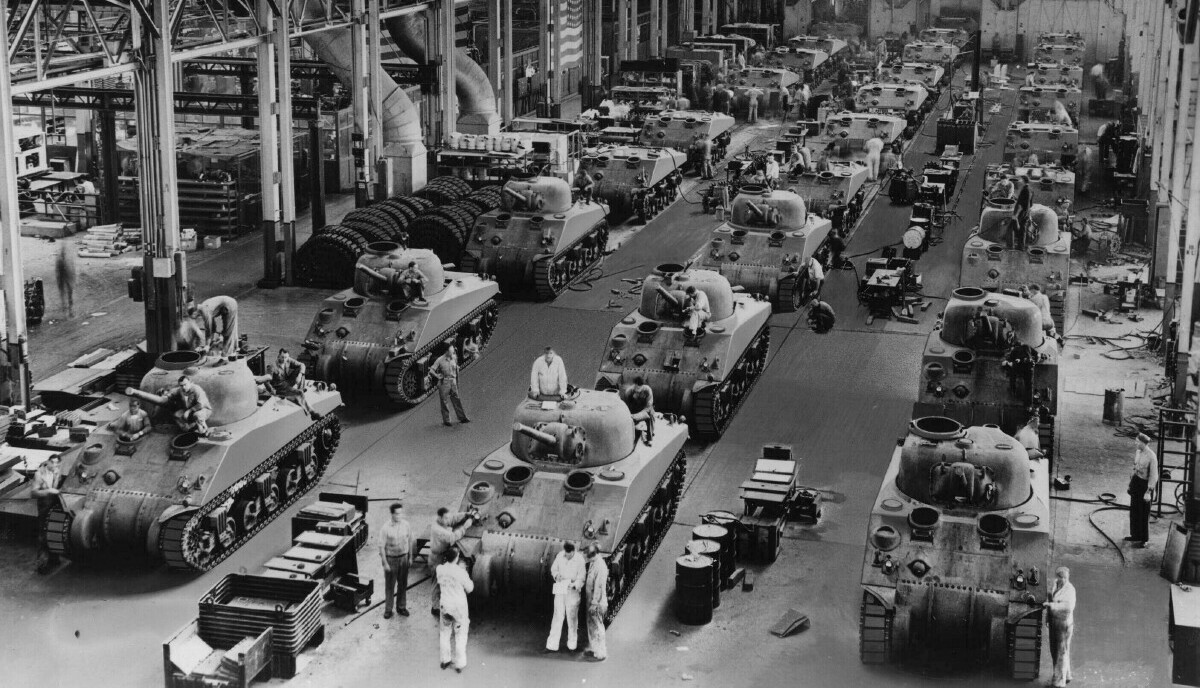
M4A4 Sherman production line in the Detroit Arsenal Tank Plant, Warren, Michigan (1942)

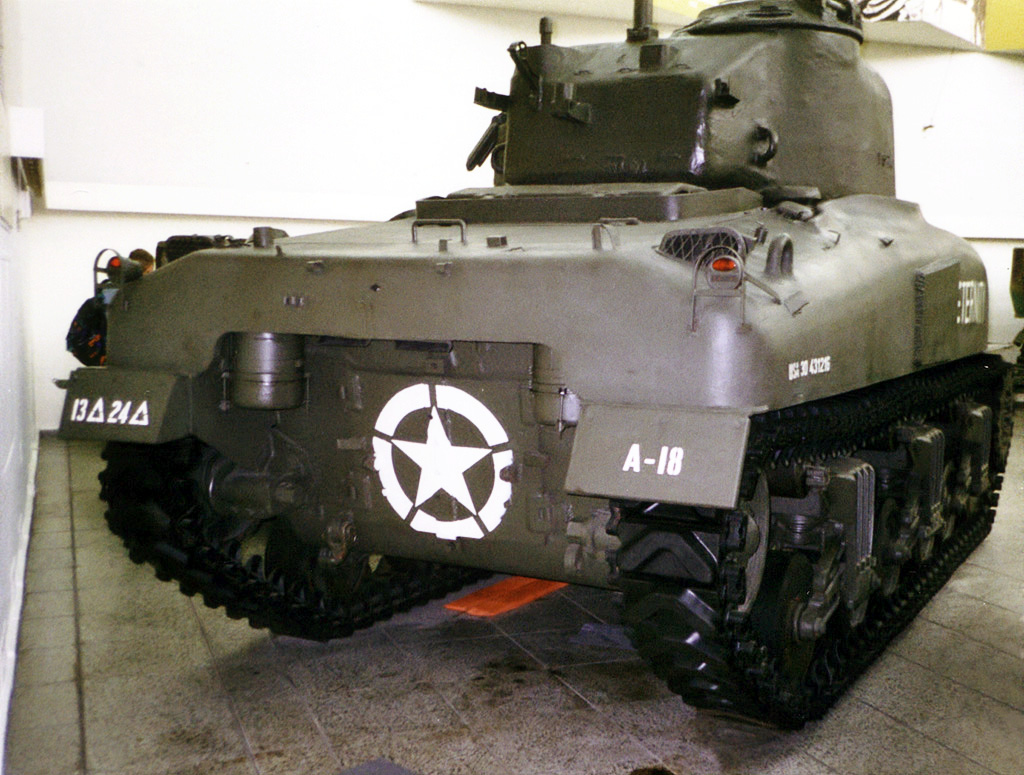
The M4 and M4A1, the first Shermans, share the inverted "U" backplate and inherited their engine and exhaust system from the earlier M3 medium tank

The first production of the Sherman took place at the Lima Locomotive Works and was first used in 1941, with many early vehicles reserved for British use under Lend-Lease; the first production Sherman was given to the U.S. Army for evaluation, and the second tank of the British order went to London. Nicknamed Michael, probably after Michael Dewar, head of the British tank mission in the U.S., the tank was displayed in London and is now an exhibit at The Tank Museum, Bovington, UK.

In World War II, the U.S. Army ultimately fielded 16 armored divisions, along with 70 separate tank battalions, while the U.S. Marine Corps fielded six tank battalions. A third of all Army tank battalions, and all six Marine tank battalions, were deployed to the Pacific Theater of Operations (PTO). Before September 1942, President Franklin D. Roosevelt had announced a production program calling for 120,000 tanks for the Allied war effort. Although the American industrial complex was not affected by enemy aerial bombing or submarine warfare as was Japan, Germany and, to a lesser degree, Great Britain, an enormous amount of steel for tank production was diverted to the construction of warships and other naval vessels. Steel used in naval construction amounted to the equivalent of approximately 67,000 tanks; and consequently, only about 53,500 tanks were produced during 1942 and 1943.

The Army had seven main sub-designations for M4 variants during production: M4, M4A1, M4A2, M4A3, M4A4, M4A5, and M4A6. These designations did not necessarily indicate linear improvement; in that "M4A4" did not indicate it was better than "M4A3". These sub-types indicated standardized production variations, which were often manufactured concurrently at different locations. The sub-types differed mainly in engines, although the M4A1 differed from the other variants by its fully cast upper hull, with a distinctive rounded appearance. The M4A4 had a longer engine that required a longer hull and more track blocks, and thus the most distinguishing feature of the M4A4 was the wider longitudinal spacing between the bogies. "M4A5" was an administrative placeholder designation for Canadian Ram tank. The M4A6 had a radial diesel engine as well as the elongated chassis of the M4A4, but only 75 of these were ever produced.

Most Sherman sub-types ran on gasoline. The air-cooled Continental-produced Wright R-975 Whirlwind 9-cylinder radial gasoline engine in the M4 and M4A1 produced 350 or 400 horsepower (260 or 300 kW). The M4A3 used the liquid-cooled 450 hp (340 kW) Ford GAA V8 gasoline engine, and the M4A4 used the liquid-cooled 370 hp (280 kW) 30 cylinder Chrysler A57 multibank gasoline engine. There were also two diesel-engined variants. The M4A2 was powered by a pair of liquid-cooled GMC Detroit Diesel 6–71 two-stroke inline engines, that produced a total of 375 hp (280 kW), while the M4A6 used an RD-1820 (a redesigned Caterpillar D-200A air-cooled radial diesel engine, adapted from Wright Aeronautical's Wright R-1820 Cyclone 9 nine-cylinder radial aircraft engine.) that produced 450 hp (340 kW). A 24-volt electrical system was used in the M4. The M4A2 and M4A4 were mostly supplied to other Allied countries under Lend-Lease.

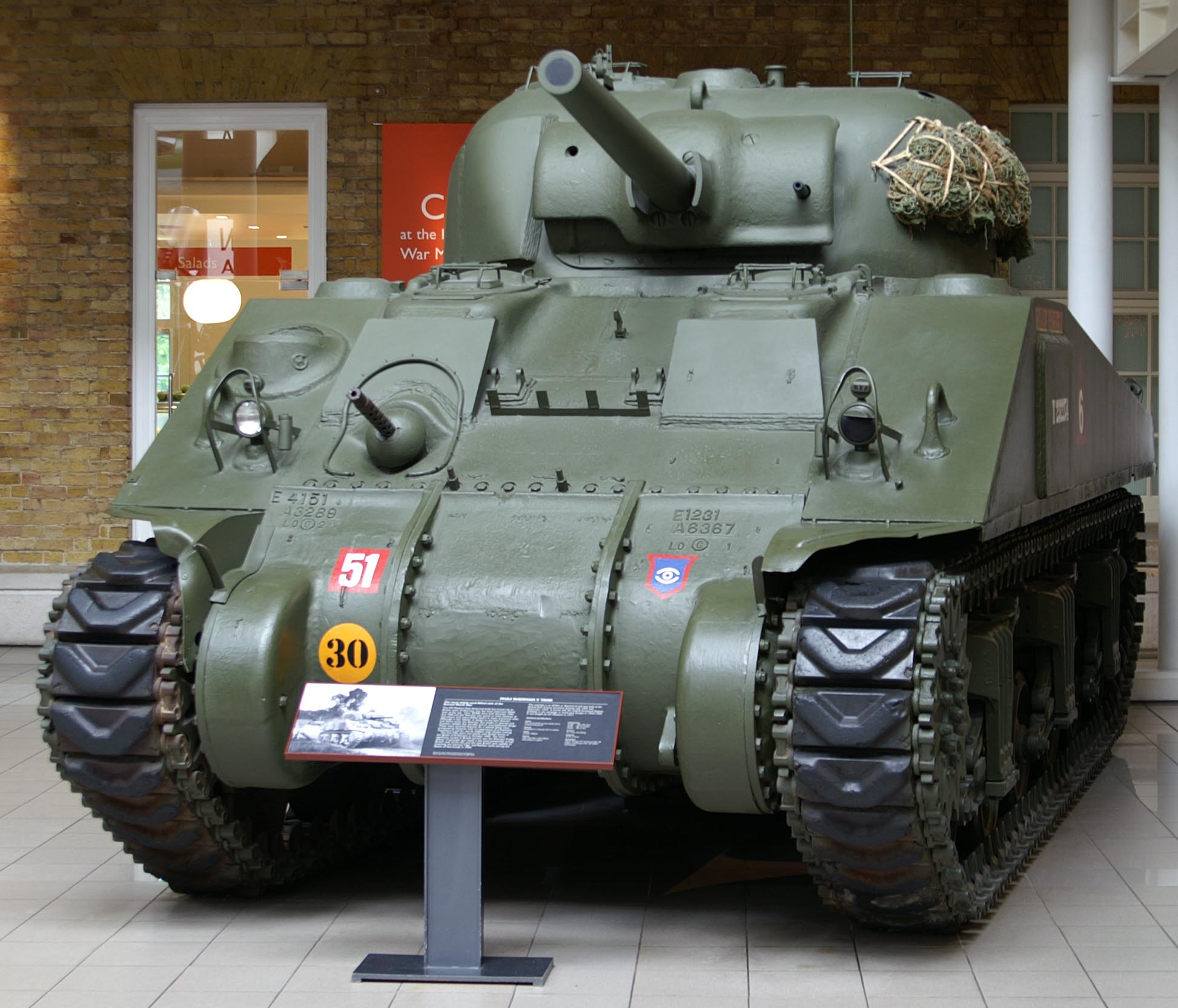
This M4A4 has extra armor plates in front of crew hatches

The term "M4" can refer specifically to the initial sub-type with its Continental radial engine, or generically, to the entire family of seven Sherman sub-types, depending on context. Many details of production, shape, strength, and performance improved while in production without a change to the tank's basic model number. These included stronger suspension units, safer "wet" (W) ammunition stowage, and stronger or more effective armor arrangements, such as the M4 "Composite", which had a cheaper to produce cast front hull section mated to a regular welded rear hull. British nomenclature for Shermans was by mark numbers for the different hulls with letters for differences in armament and suspension: A for a vehicle with the 76 mm gun, B for the 105 mm howitzer, C for the 17-pounder gun, and Y for any vehicle equipped with horizontal volute spring suspension (HVSS), e.g. British operated M4A1(76) was known as Sherman IIA.

M4 Sherman: comparison of key product features of selected models
Designation	Main armament	Hull	Engine
M4	75 mm	welded	gasoline Continental R975 radial
M4(105)	105 mm howitzer	welded	gasoline Continental R975 radial
M4 Composite	75 mm	cast front, welded sides	gasoline Continental R975 radial
M4A1	75 mm	cast	gasoline Continental R975 radial
M4A1(76)W	76 mm	cast	gasoline Continental R975 radial
M4A2	75 mm	welded	GM 6046 diesel (conjoined 6-71s)
M4A2(76)W	76 mm	welded	GM 6046 diesel (conjoined 6-71s)
M4A3(75)W	75 mm	welded	gasoline Ford GAA V8
M4A3E2 "Jumbo"	75 mm (some 76 mm)	welded	gasoline Ford GAA V8
M4A3(76)W	76 mm	welded	gasoline Ford GAA V8
M4A4	75 mm	welded; lengthened	gasoline Chrysler A57 multibank
M4A6	75 mm	cast front, welded sides; lengthened	diesel Caterpillar D200A radial
W = wet ammunition stowage system (ammunition racks surrounded in wet jackets to prevent sparks from enemy penetration)

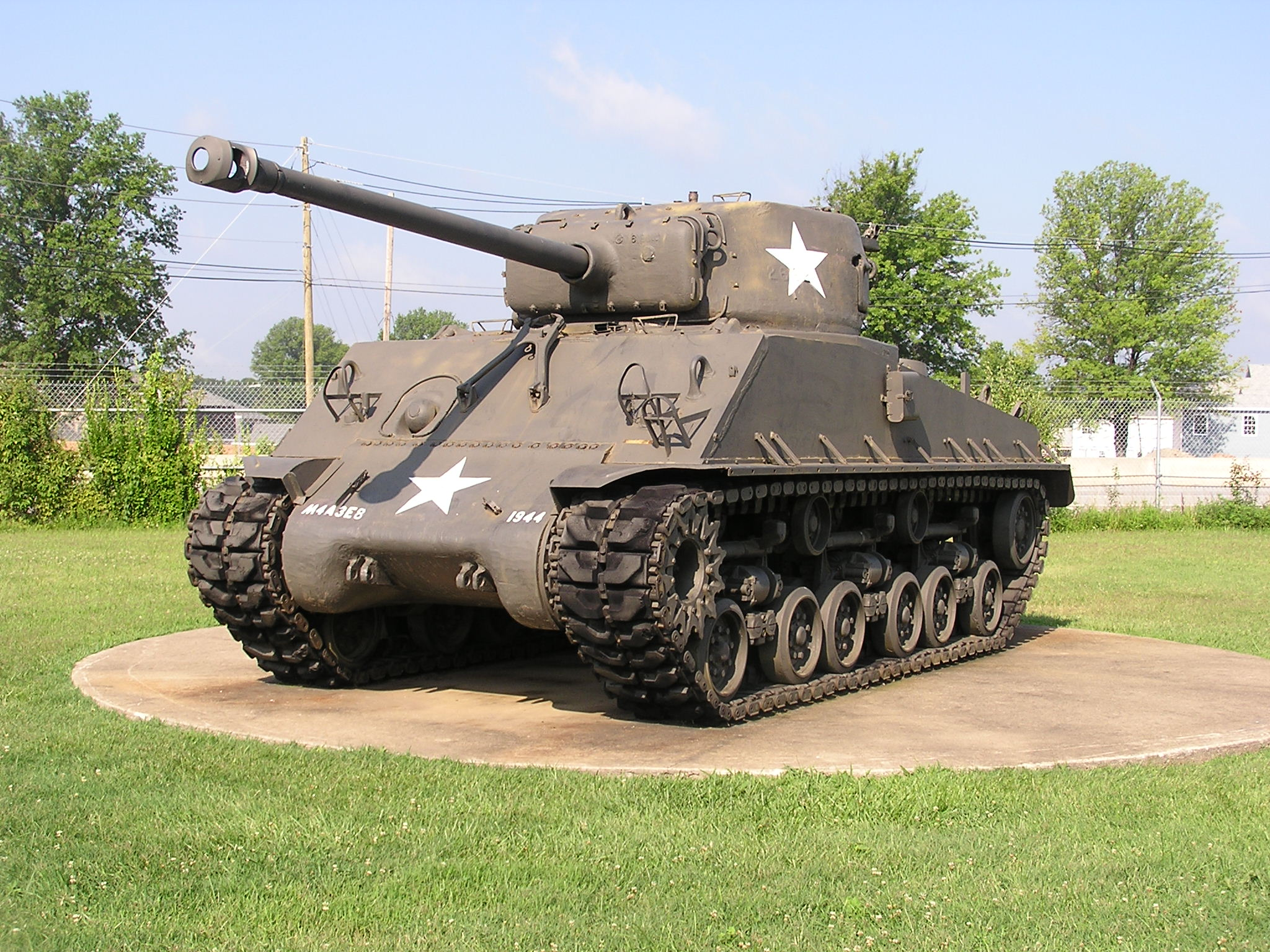
M4A3(76)W HVSS "Easy Eight" equipped with a 76 mm gun M1 and Horizontal Volute Spring Suspension

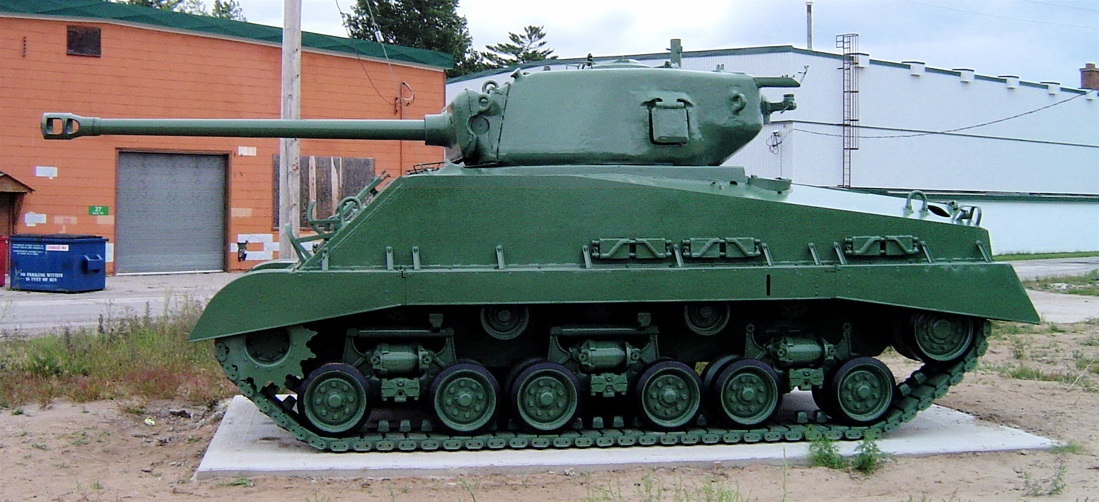
M4A2(76)W HVSS with T23 turret, 76 mm gun muzzle brake, and track fenders at CFB Borden

M4A1 (76)W HVSS at Bastogne Barracks

M4A1 (76)W HVSS at Bastogne Barracks

Early Shermans mounted a 75 mm medium-velocity general-purpose gun. Although Ordnance began work on the T20/22/23 series as Sherman replacements, the Army Ground Forces were satisfied with the M4 and Armored Force Board considered some features of the experimental tanks unsatisfactory. Continuing with M4 minimized production disruption but elements of the experimental designs were incorporated into the Sherman. Later M4A1, M4A2, and M4A3 models received the larger turret with high velocity 76 mm gun trialed on the T23 tank. The first standard-production 76 mm gun-armed Sherman was an M4A1, accepted in January 1944, which first saw combat in July 1944 during Operation Cobra. Variants of the M4 and M4A3 were factory-produced with a 105 mm howitzer and a distinctive rounded gun mantlet, which surrounded the main gun, on the turret. The first Sherman variant to be armed with the 105 mm howitzer was the M4, first accepted in February 1944.

M4A4 Cutaway: 1 – Lifting ring, 2 – Ventilator, 3 – Turret hatch, 4 – Periscope, 5 – Turret hatch race, 6 – Turret seat, 7 – Gunner's seat, 8 – Turret seat, 9 – Turret, 10 – Air cleaner, 11 – Radiator filler cover, 12 – Air cleaner manifold, 13 – Power unit, 14 – Exhaust pipe, 15 – Track idler, 16 – Single water pump, 17 – Radiator, 18 – Generator, 19 – Rear propeller shaft, 20 – Turret basket, 21 – Slip ring, 22 – Front propeller shaft, 23 – Suspension bogie, 24 – Transmission, 25 – Main drive sprocket, 26 – Driver's seat, 27 – Machine gunner's seat, 28 – 75 mm gun, 29 – Drivers hatch, 30 – M1919A4 machine gun.

From May to July 1944, the Army accepted a limited run of 254 M4A3E2 "Jumbo" Shermans, which had very thick hull armor and the 75 mm gun in a new, better-protected T23-style turret ("Jumbos" could mount the 76 mm M1 cannon), to assault fortifications, leading convoys, and spearhead armored columns. The M4A3 model was the first to be factory-produced with the HVSS system with wider tracks to distribute weight, beginning in August 1944. With the smooth ride of the HVSS, it gained the nickname "Easy Eight" from its experimental "E8" designation. The M4 and M4A3 105 mm-armed tanks, as well as the M4A1 and M4A2 76 mm-armed tanks, were also eventually equipped with HVSS. Both the Americans and the British developed a wide array of special attachments for the Sherman, although few saw combat, remaining experimental. Those that saw action included a bulldozer blade, the Duplex Drive system, flamethrowers for Zippo flame tanks, and various rocket launchers such as the T34 Calliope. British variants (DDs and mine flails) formed part of the group of specialized vehicles collectively known as "Hobart's Funnies" (after Percy Hobart, commander of the 79th Armoured Division).

The M4 Sherman's basic chassis was used for all the sundry roles of a modern mechanized force. These included the M10 and M36 tank destroyers; M7B1, M12, M40, and M43 self-propelled artillery; the M32 and M74 "tow truck"-style recovery tanks with winches, booms, and an 81 mm mortar for smoke screens; and the M34 (from M32B1) and M35 (from M10A1) artillery prime movers.

M4 Sherman production
Designation	Manufacturers	Total	Date
M4	Pressed Steel Car Company; Baldwin Locomotive Works; American Locomotive Co. Pullman-Standard Car Company; Detroit Tank Arsenal	6,748	July 1942 – January 1944
M4(105)	Detroit Tank Arsenal	800	February 1944 – September 1944
M4(105) HVSS	Detroit Tank Arsenal	841	September 1944 – March 1945
M4A1	Lima Locomotive Works; Pressed Steel Car Company; Pacific Car and Foundry Company	6,281	February 1942 – December 1943
M4A1(76)W	Pressed Steel Car Company	2,171	January 1944 – December 1944
M4A1(76)W HVSS	Pressed Steel Car Company	1,255	January 1945 – July 1945
M4A2	Fisher Tank Arsenal (Grand Blanc) Pullman-Standard Car Company; American Locomotive Co. Baldwin Locomotive Works; Federal Machine and Welder Co.	8,053	April 1942 – May 1944
M4A2(76)W	Fisher Tank Arsenal	1,594	May 1944 – December 1944
M4A2(76)W HVSS	Fisher Tank Arsenal; Pressed Steel Car Company	1,321	January 1945 – May 1945
M4A3	Ford Motor Company	1,690	June 1942 – September 1943
M4A3(75)W	Fisher Tank Arsenal	2,420	February 1944 – December 1944
M4A3(75)W HVSS	Fisher Tank Arsenal	651	January 1945 – March 1945
M4A3E2	Fisher Tank Arsenal	254	May 1944 – July 1944
M4A3(76)W	Detroit Tank Arsenal; Fisher Tank Arsenal	1,400; 500 total 1,925 (Note: 1,458 according to Conners, Medium Tank M4A1 Sherman (2013))	February–July 1944; September 1944 – December 1944
M4A3(76)W HVSS	Detroit Tank Arsenal	2,617	July 1944 – April 1945
M4A3(105)	Detroit Tank Arsenal	500	May 1944 – September 1944
M4A3(105) HVSS	Detroit Tank Arsenal	2,539	September 1944 – June 1945
M4A4	Detroit Tank Arsenal	7,499	July 1942 – November 1943
M4A6	Detroit Tank Arsenal	75	October 1943 – February 1944
Total		49,234	

== Service history ==
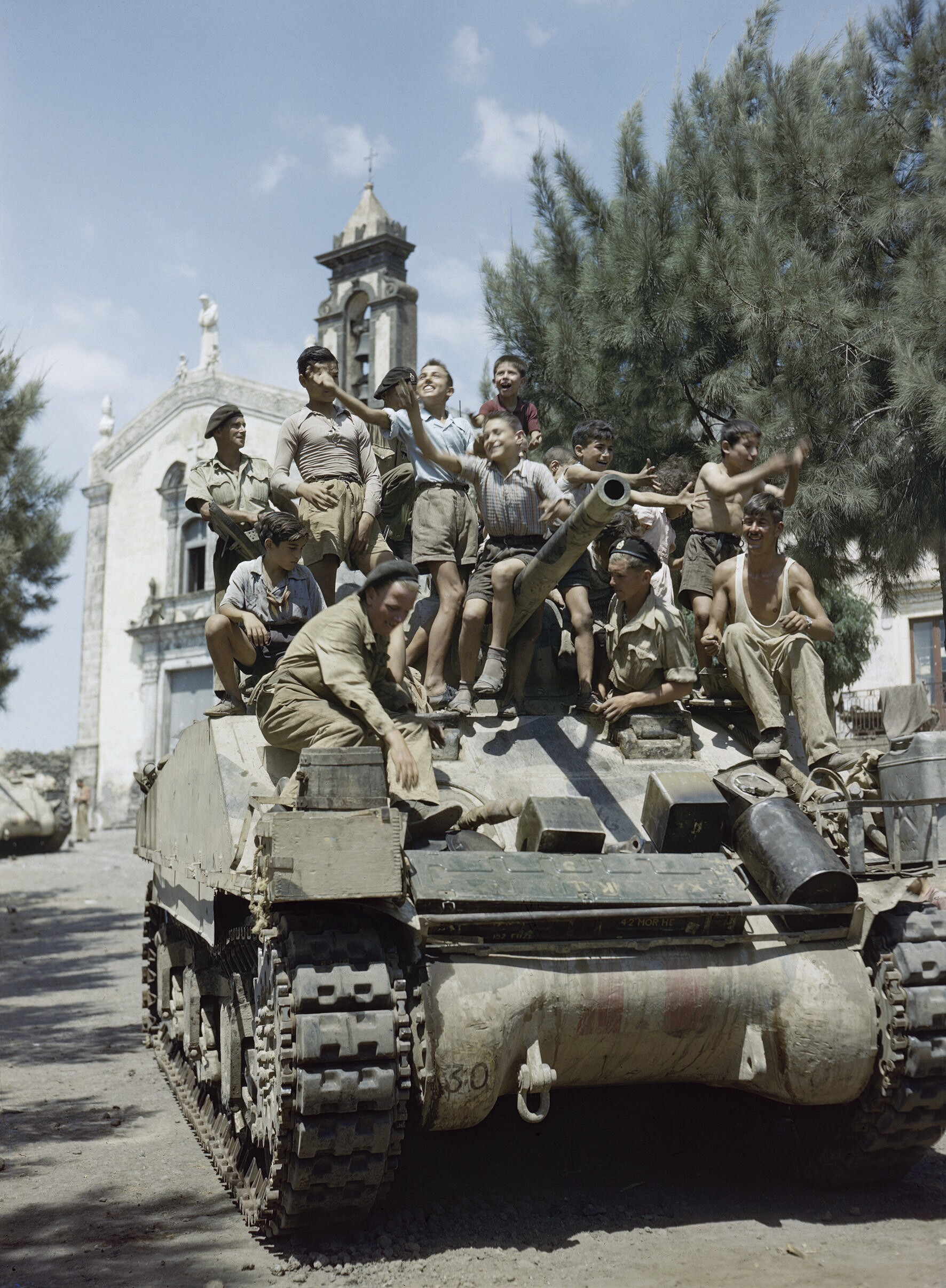
British tank Sherman M4A2 in 1943, during the Allied invasion of Sicily

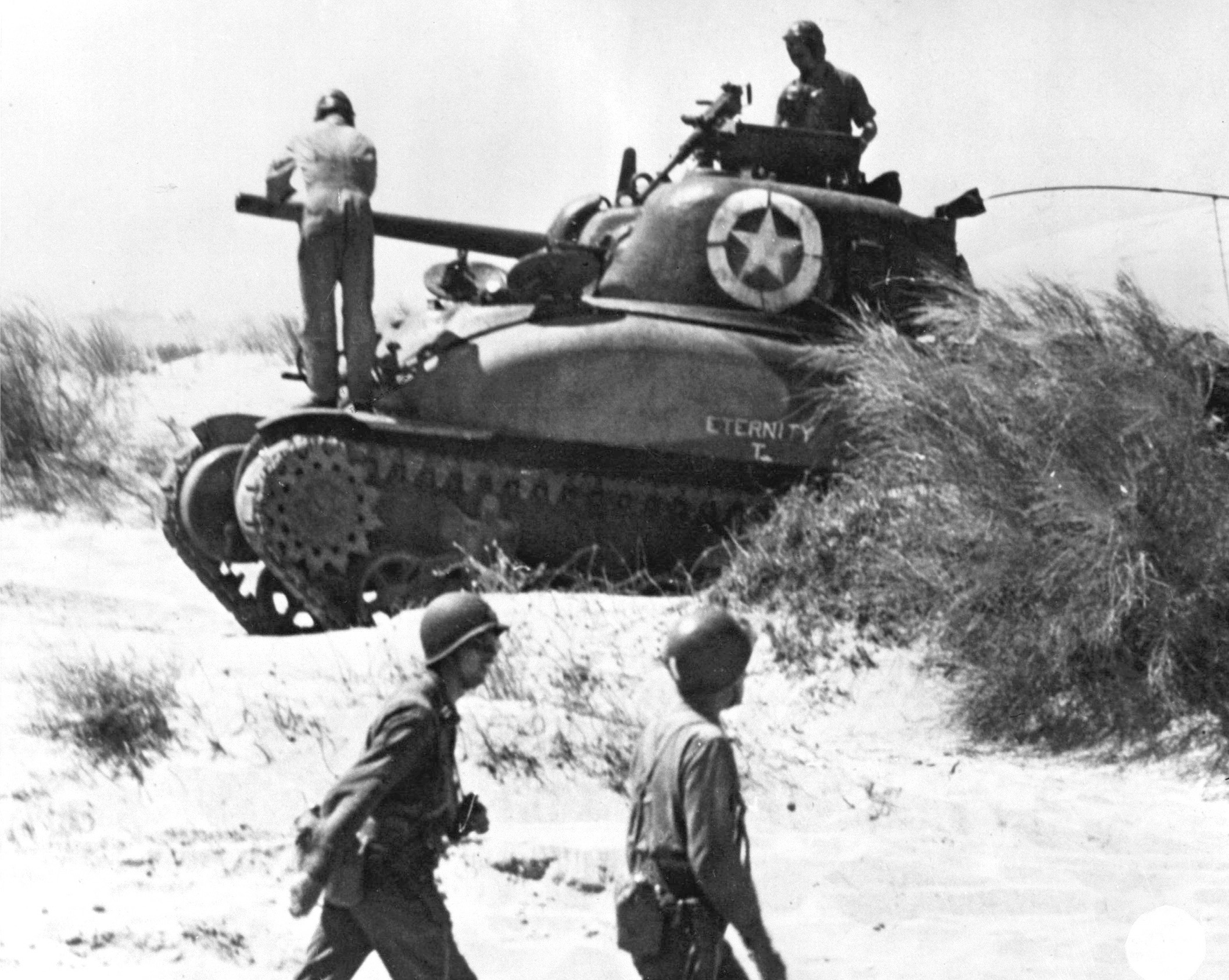
The first Sherman in U.S. service, the M4A1, appeared in the North Africa campaign. Here, one of the 7th Army lands at Red Beach 2 on July 10, 1943, during the Allied invasion of Sicily

=== Allocation ===
During World War II, approximately 19,247 Shermans were issued to the U.S. Army and about 1,114 to the U.S. Marine Corps. The U.S. also supplied 17,184 to United Kingdom (some of which in turn went to the Canadians and to the Free Poles), while the Soviet Union received 4,102 and an estimated 812 were transferred to China. These numbers were distributed further to the respective countries' allied nations.

The U.S. Marine Corps used the diesel M4A2 and gasoline powered M4A3 in the Pacific. However, the Chief of the Army's Armored Force, Lt. Gen. Jacob L. Devers, ordered that no diesel-engined Shermans be used by the Army outside the Zone of Interior (the continental U.S.). The Army used all types for either training or testing within the United States but intended the M4A2 and M4A4 (with the A57 Multibank engine) to be the primary Lend-Lease exports.

=== First combat ===
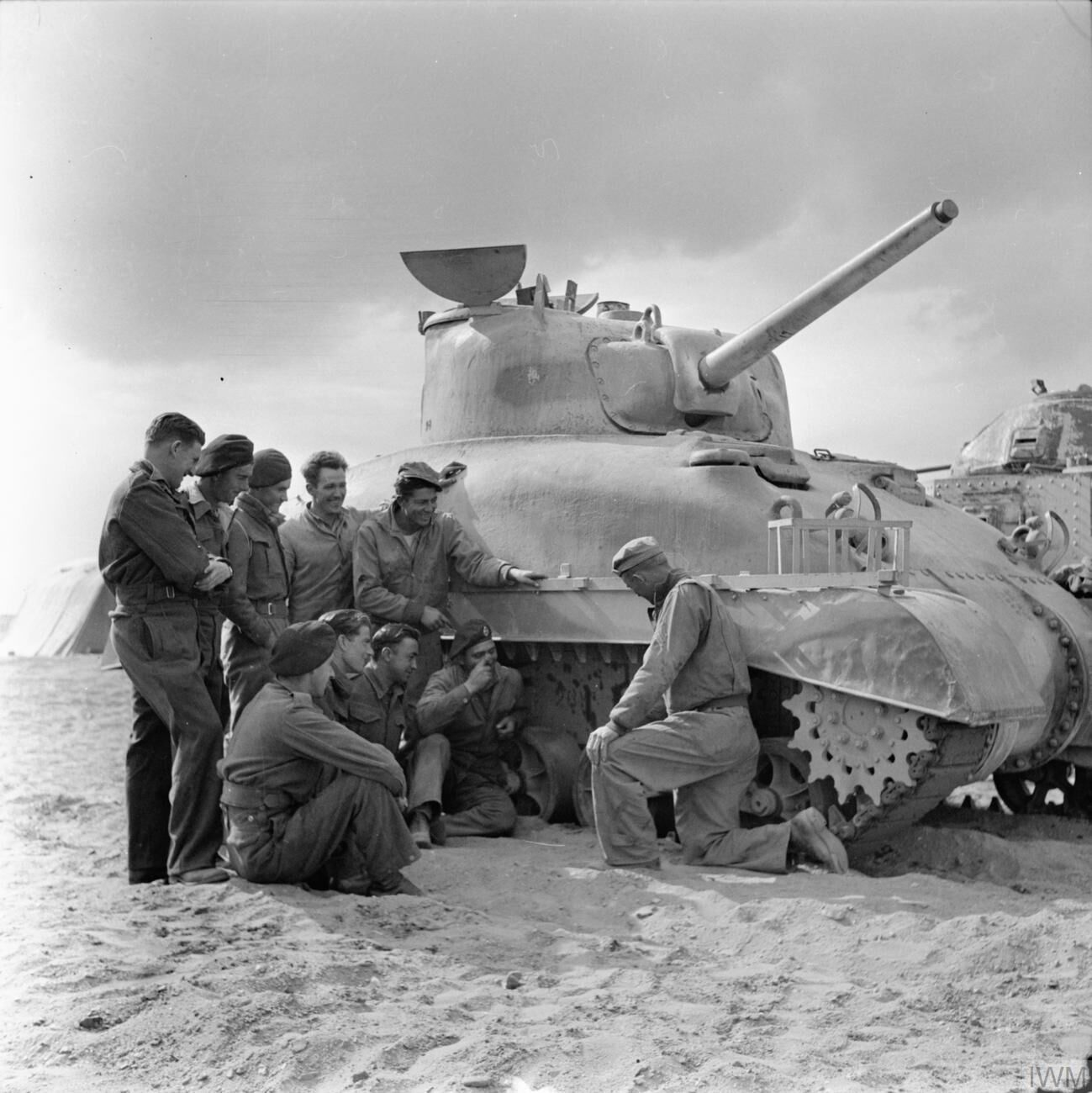
British, South African and New Zealand tank crews receive instruction from an American instructor in Egypt, February 1943.

Shermans were being issued in small numbers for familiarization to U.S. armored divisions when there was a turn of events in the Western Desert campaign. On 21 June 1942, Axis forces captured Tobruk, threatening Egypt and Britain's supply line through the Suez Canal. British Prime Minister Winston Churchill was at the Second Washington Conference when news of the defeat broke; President Franklin D. Roosevelt asked what he could do to help and Churchill replied at once, "Give us as many Sherman tanks as you can spare and ship them to the Middle East as quickly as possible." The US considered collecting all Shermans together to be able to send the 2nd Armored Division under Patton to reinforce Egypt, but delivering the Shermans directly to the British was quicker and over 300 – mostly M4A1s, but also including M4A2s – had arrived there by September 1942.

The Shermans were modified for desert warfare with shields over the tracks and another stowage. The Sherman first saw combat at the Second Battle of El Alamein in October 1942 with the British 8th Army. At the start of the offensive, there were 252 tanks fit for action. These equipped the British 9th Armoured Brigade (for the battle under the New Zealand Division), 2nd Armoured Brigade (1st Armoured Division), and 8th and 20th Armoured Brigades (10th Armoured Division). Their first encounter with tanks was against German Panzer III and IV tanks with long 50 mm and 75 mm guns engaging them at 2,000 yards (1,800 m). There were losses to both sides.

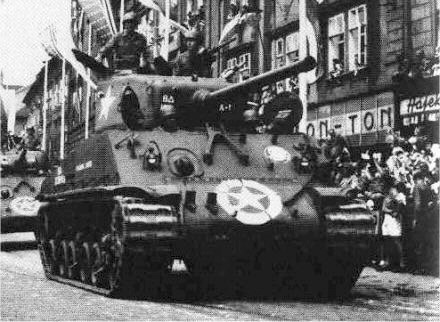
M4A3(76)W HVSS participating in a World War II victory parade

The first U.S. Shermans in battle were M4s and M4A1s in Operation Torch the following month. On 6 December, near Tebourba, Tunisia, a platoon from the 2nd Battalion, 13th Armored Regiment was lost to enemy tanks and anti-tank guns.

Additional M4s and M4A1s replaced M3s in U.S. tank battalions over the course of the North African campaign.

The M4 and M4A1 were the main types in U.S. units until the fall of 1944 when the Army began replacing them with the preferred M4A3 with its more powerful 500 hp (370 kW) engine. Some M4s and M4A1s continued in U.S. service for the rest of the war. The first Sherman to enter combat with the 76 mm gun in July 1944 was the M4A1, then the M4A2, closely followed by the M4A3. By the end of the war, roughly half the U.S. Army Shermans in Europe had the 76 mm gun. The first HVSS-equipped Sherman to see combat was the M4A3(76)W in December 1944.

=== Eastern Front ===
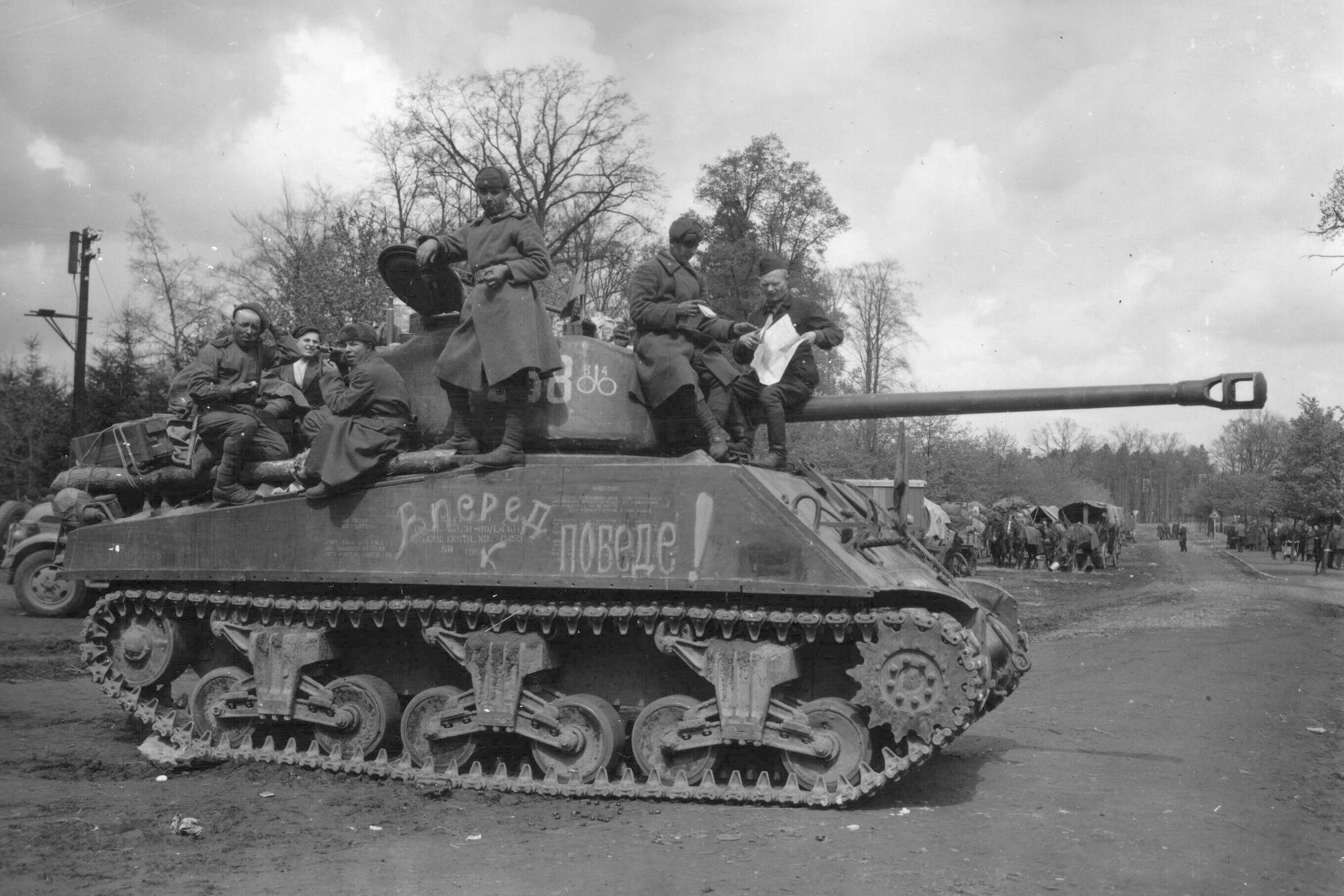
A Soviet M4A2 of the 8th Guards Mechanized Corps at Grabow in eastern Germany, May 1945.

Under Lend-Lease, 3,664 M4A2 medium tanks were sent to the Soviet Union. The first 76 mm-armed M4A2 Shermans started to arrive in the Soviet Union in the late summer of 1944. The Soviet records reported the receiving of 3,664 tanks; the difference mainly due to deliveries being sunk on the way and discrepancies between the United States and Soviet Union archives

The Red Army considered the M4A2 to be much less prone to catch fire due to ammunition detonation than the T-34/76, but the M4A2 had a higher tendency to overturn in road accidents and collisions or because of rough terrain than the T-34 due to its higher center of gravity.

By 1945, some Red Army armored units were equipped entirely with the Sherman. Such units included the 1st Guards Mechanized Corps, the 3rd Guards Mechanized Corps and the 9th Guards Mechanized Corps, amongst others. According to Soviet tanker Dmitriy Loza, the Sherman was held in good regard and viewed positively by many Soviet tank crews, with compliments given to its reliability, ease of maintenance, generally good firepower (referring especially to the 76 mm gun version) as well as an auxiliary power unit (APU) to keep the tank's batteries charged without having to run the main engine, as was required on the T-34. However, according to Soviet tank crews, the Sherman also had disadvantages, the greatest being its high center of gravity and the ease of hitting it by enemy fire. The Sherman's relatively narrow-set tracks struggled to negotiate muddy terrain compared to the wider-set tracks of the T-34 or German Panther tank.

David M. Glantz wrote: "[The Sherman’s] narrow treads made it much less mobile on mud than its German and Soviet counterparts, and it consumed great quantities of fuel..." Glantz noted that Soviet tankers preferred the American tanks to the British ones, but preferred Soviet ones most of all.

=== Pacific theater ===
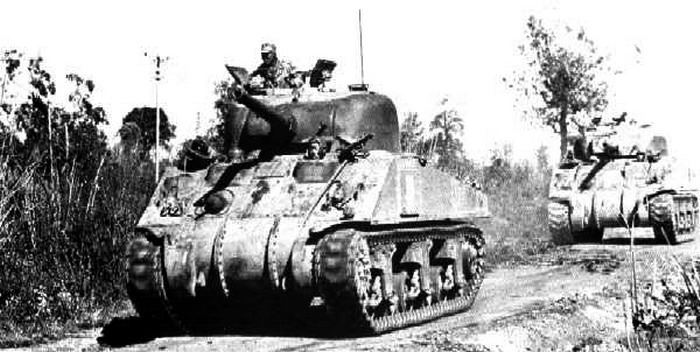
Chinese M4A4 Sherman of the Sino-American Provisional Tank Group in East Burma

While combat in the European theater often consisted of high-profile armored warfare, the mainly naval nature of the Pacific theater relegated it to secondary status for both the Allies and the Japanese. While the U.S. Army fielded 16 armored divisions and 70 separate tank battalions during the war, only a third of the battalions and none of the divisions were deployed to the Pacific theater. The Imperial Japanese Army (IJA) deployed only their 1st Tank Division and 2nd Tank Division to the Pacific during the war with the 3rd Tank Division being deployed in Burma, China and Manchukuo's border with the Soviet Union and the 4th Tank Division remaining on the Japanese home islands in preparation for an allied invasion that never came. Armor from both sides mostly operated in jungle terrain that was poorly suited to armored warfare. For this type of terrain, the Japanese and the Allies found light tanks easier to transport and deploy.

A platoon of Sherman tanks of the 713th Tank Battalion gathered at a ridge on Okinawa.

During the early stages of combat in the Pacific, specifically, the Guadalcanal campaign, the U.S. Marine Corps' M2A4 light tank fought against the equally matched Type 95 Ha-Go light tank; both were armed with a 37 mm main gun. However, the M2 (produced in 1940) was newer by five years. By 1943, the IJA still used the Type 95 and Type 97 Chi-Ha medium tanks, while Allied forces were quickly replacing their light tanks with 75 mm-armed M4s. The Chinese in India received 100 M4 Shermans and used them to great effect in the subsequent 1944 and 1945 offensives in the China Burma India theater.

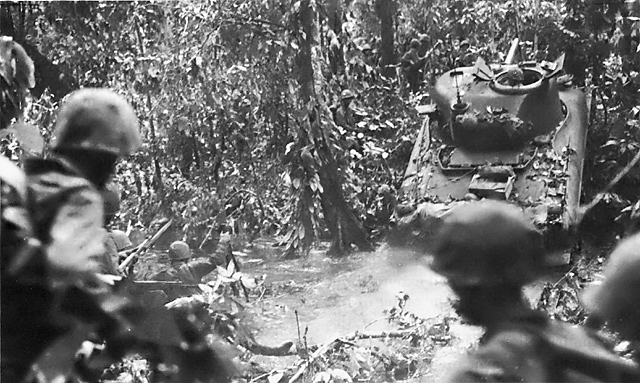
As part of Operation Dexterity, an M4A1 (75 mm) advances through a tropical rain forest on New Britain, in the South-West Pacific

To counter the Sherman, the Japanese developed the Type 3 Chi-Nu and the heavier Type 4 Chi-To; both tanks were armed with 75 mm guns, albeit of different type. Only 166 Type 3s and two Type 4s were built, and none saw combat; they were saved for the defense of the Japanese home islands, leaving 1930s era light and medium armor to do battle against 1940s-built Allied light and medium armor.

During the later years of the war, general purpose high explosive ammunition was preferred for fighting Japanese tanks because armor-piercing rounds, which had been designed for penetrating thicker steel, often went through the thin armor of the Type 95 Ha-Go (the most commonly encountered Japanese tank) and out the other side without stopping. Although the armor-piercing rounds were useful for penetrating fortifications, M4 direct fire seldom destroyed Japanese fortifications. Instead, M4s armed with flamethrowers proved more useful.

=== Korean War ===
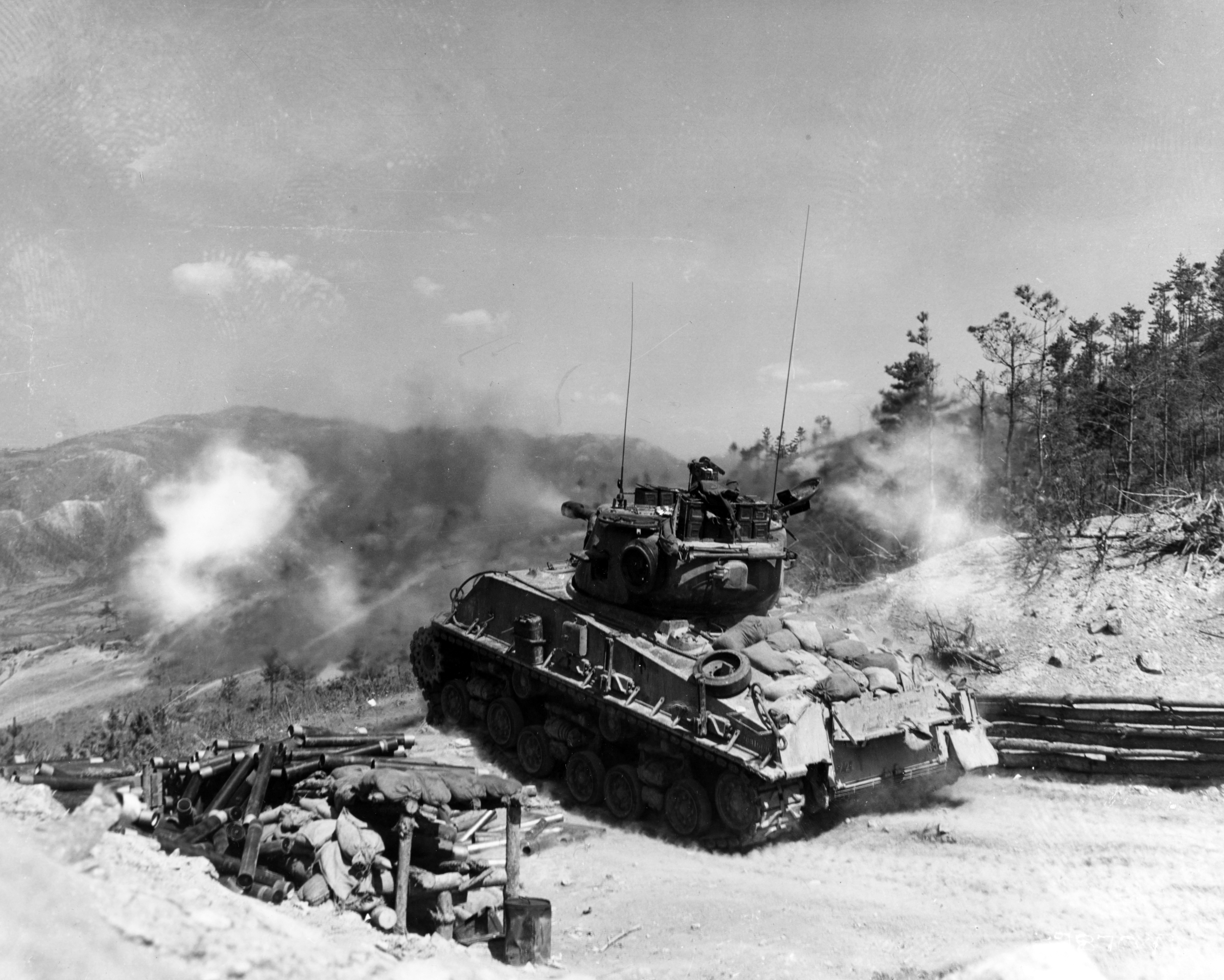
Last type in US service: M4A3E8 Sherman used as artillery in firing position during the Korean War

During the Korean War, the M4A3E8 Easy Eight was the main tank force of the U.S. military until the signing of the armistice agreement.

At the outbreak of the war, the U.S. military tried to deploy the M4A3E8, a medium-sized tank of the same class, to respond to North Korean T-34-85, but there were few tanks available for rapid deployment from the Far East due to disarmament after World War II. The U.S. Far East Command collected 58 M4A3E8 scattered throughout Japan, created the 8072nd Provisional Tank Battalion (later renamed to the 89th Tank Battalion) on 17 July and landed them in Busan on 1 August. The 8072nd Provisional Tank Battalion was immediately deployed for Battle of Masan to support the 25th U.S. Infantry Division.

Since then, a total of 679 M4A3E8 were deployed on the Korean Peninsula in 1950. The M4A3E8 and T-34-85 were comparable and could destroy each other at normal combat ranges, although the use of High-Velocity Armor Piercing ammunition, advanced optics, and better crew training gave the Sherman an advantage. The M4A3E8, using 76 mm HVAP ammunition, destroyed 41 enemy tanks from July 1950 to November of the same year.

The M4A3E8 had weaker anti-tank combat capability compared to the larger caliber M26 Pershing and the M46 Patton that were operated at the same time. However, the lighter M4A3E8 became the preferred U.S. tank in the later phases of the war. It was considered more advantageous in terms of maneuverability on rough terrain and ease of maintenance due to the mechanical reliability. Because of this feature, the M4A3E8 were widely used for providing close support to infantry units, particularly during battles for high ground and mountains.

From December 1951, around 20 M4A3E8s saw service with the Republic of Korea Marine Corps during the war while the Army operated M36 GMCs as its main armored asset.

=== Other uses ===
After World War II, the U.S. kept the M4A3E8 Easy Eight in service, with either the 76 mm gun or a 105 mm M4 howitzer. The U.S. Army replaced the M4 in 1957, in favor of the M47 Patton, M48 Patton and, M60 Patton. The U.S. continued to transfer Shermans to its allies, which contributed to widespread foreign use.

The Israeli Defense Force used Shermans from its creation in 1948 until the 1980s, having first acquired a single M4A2 lacking the main armament from British forces as they withdrew from Israel. The popularity of the tank (having now been re-armed) compared to the outdated, 1934-origin French Renault R35 interwar light tanks with their 37 mm short-barreled guns, which made up the bulk of the IDF's tank force, led to the purchase of 30 unarmed M4(105 mm)s from Italian scrapyards. Three of these, plus the original M4A2, saw extensive service in the 1948-9 war of independence. The remainder were then serviced and rearmed with 75 mm guns and components whenever these became available, composing a large part of Israeli tank forces for the next eight years. The 75 mm-armed Shermans were replaced by M4A1 (76 mm) Shermans imported from France before the 1956 Suez Crisis after it was realized that their armor penetration was insufficient for combat against newer tanks such as the IDF Centurions as well as the T-34-85s being delivered to Egyptian forces. During further upgrades, the French military helped develop a conversion kit to upgrade about 300 Shermans to the long high-velocity 75 mm gun CN 75-50 used in the AMX-13. These were designated Sherman M-50 by the Israelis. Before the Six-Day War in 1967, the Israeli Army upgraded about 180 M4A1(76)W HVSS Shermans with the French 105 mm Modèle F1 gun, re-engined them with Cummins diesel engines, and designated the upgraded tank Sherman M-51. The Sherman tanks, fighting alongside the 105 mm Centurion Shot Kal and M48 Patton tanks, were able to defeat the T-34-85, T-54/55/62 series, and IS-3 tanks used by the Egyptian and Syrian forces in the 1967 Six-Day War.

M4A3s were also used by British forces in Indonesia during the Indonesian National Revolution until 1946 when they were passed on to the KNIL, which used them until 1949 before they were passed on to the Indonesian National Armed Forces.

== Armament ==
=== Gun development ===
As the Sherman was being designed, provisions were made so that multiple types of main armament (specified as a 75 mm gun, a 3-inch gun, or a 105 mm howitzer) could be mounted in the turret. The possibility of mounting the main gun of the M6 heavy tank, the 3-inch gun M7, in the turret of the M4 Sherman was explored first, but its size and weight (the weapon was modified from a land-based antiaircraft gun) made it too large to fit in the turret of the Sherman. Development on a new 76 mm gun better suited to the Sherman began in fall 1942.

In early 1942, tests began on the feasibility of mounting a 105 mm howitzer into the turret of the Sherman. The basic 105 mm howitzer M2A1 was found to be ill-designed for mounting in a tank turret, so it was completely redesigned and re-designated the 105 mm howitzer M4. After modifications to the turret (concerning the balancing of the gun and the strength of the power traverse) and interior of the hull (concerning the stowage of the 105 mm ammunition), the Ordnance Department expressed its approval of the project, and production of M4 tanks armed with 105 mm howitzers began in February 1944.

The Sherman would enter combat in 1942 equipped with the 75 mm gun M3, a 40-caliber gun that could penetrate an estimated 88 mm (3.5 in) of rolled homogeneous armor (RHA) at 90 degrees, a range of 100 m (110 yd) and 73 mm (2.9 in) at 1,000 m (1,100 yd) firing the usual M61 APCBC round, and equipped with an M38A2 telescopic gunsight. Facing the early Panzer III and Panzer IV in North Africa, the Sherman's gun could penetrate the frontal armor of these tanks at normal combat ranges, within 1,000 yd (910 m). U.S. Army Intelligence discounted the arrival of the Tiger I in 1942 and the Panther tank in 1943, predicting that the Panther would be a heavy tank like the Tiger I, and doubted that many would be produced. There were also reports of British QF 6-pounder (57 mm) guns being able to destroy the Tiger I. The Army failed to anticipate that the Germans would attempt to make the Panther the standard tank of their panzer divisions in 1944, supported by small numbers of Tiger I and IIs.

Effectiveness of common American tank guns
	105 mm	75 mm	76 mm
Lethal shrapnel pieces in a 20 ft radius from HE round	1,010	950	560
Max penetration distance on unsloped rolled homogeneous armor		88 mm (100 meters)	

When the newly designed 76 mm gun, known as the T1, was first installed in the M4 in spring 1943, it was found to unbalance the turret, and the gun barrel also protruded too far forward, making it more difficult to transport and susceptible to hitting the ground when the tank traveled over undulating terrain. The barrel length was reduced by 15 in (380 mm) (from 57 calibers to 52), resulting in the M1 variant. Mounting this gun in the original M4 turret proved problematic, so the turret for the aborted T23 tank project was used instead for the definitive production version of the 76 mm M4 Shermans, along with a modified version of the gun known as the M1A1.

Despite the Ordnance Department's development of new 76 mm and 90 mm anti-tank guns, the Army Ground Forces rejected their deployment as unnecessary. An attempt to upgrade the M4 Sherman by installing the 90 mm-armed turret from the T26 tank project on an M4 hull in April 1944 (referred to as the M4/T26) was halted after realizing it could not go into production sooner than the T26 and would likely delay T26 development. Even in 1943, most German armored fighting vehicles (later models of the Panzer IV tank, StuG III assault gun and Marder III panzerjaeger self-propelled anti-tank gun) mounted the 7.5 cm KwK 40. As a result, even weakly armored light German tank destroyers, such as the Marder III, which was meant to be a stop-gap measure to fight Soviet tanks in 1942, could destroy Shermans from a distance. The disparity in firepower between the German armored fighting vehicles that began to be fielded in 1943 and the 75 mm-armed M4 was the impetus to begin production of 76 mm-armed M4s in January 1944. In testing before the invasion of Normandy, the 76 mm gun was found to have an undesirably large muzzle blast that kicked up dust from the ground and obscured vision for further firing. The M1A1C gun, which entered production lines in March 1944, was threaded for a muzzle brake, but as the brakes were still in development, the threads were protected with a cap. The addition of a muzzle brake on the new M1A2 gun (which also incorporated a faster rifling twist leading to a slight accuracy increase at longer ranges) beginning in October 1944 finally solved this problem by directing the blast sideways.

Army doctrine at the time emphasized the multirole ability of the tank, and the capability of the high explosive shell was considered important. Being a dedicated anti-tank gun, the 76 mm had a much weaker high explosive shell than the existing 75 mm and was not initially accepted by various U.S. armored division commanders, even though many had already been produced and were available. All of the U.S. Army M4s deployed initially in Normandy in June 1944 had the 75 mm gun. Fighting against Panther tanks in Normandy quickly demonstrated the need for better anti-tank firepower, and the 76 mm M4s were deployed to First Army units in July 1944. Operation Cobra was the combat debut of the 76 mm gun-armed Sherman, in the form of the M4A1(76)W. General George S. Patton's Third Army were initially issued 75 mm M4s and accepted 76 mm-armed M4s only after the Battle of Arracourt against Panther tanks in late September 1944.

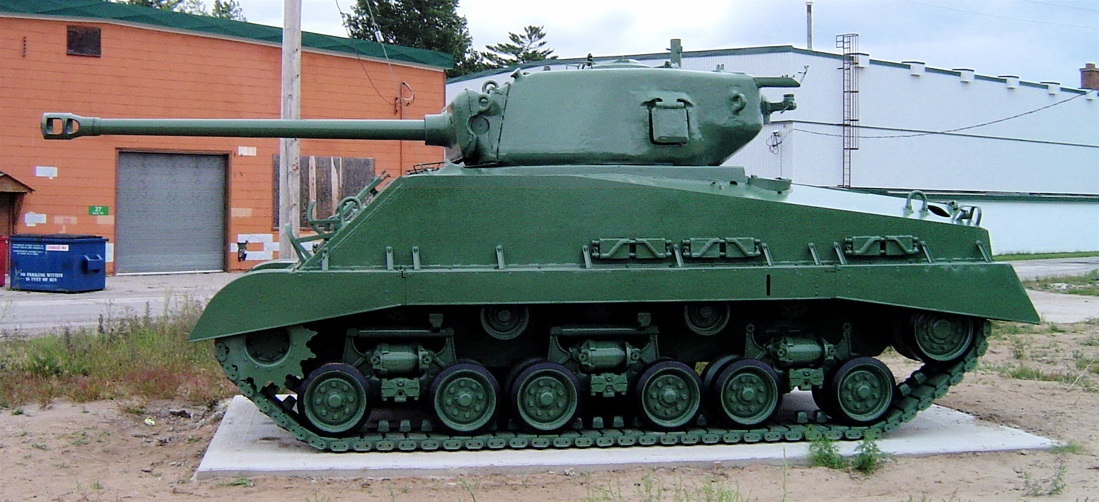
M4A2(76) HVSS with T23 turret and later 76 mm gun's muzzle brake; it also sports fenders, usually omitted on U.S. vehicles to ease maintenance

The higher-velocity 76 mm gun gave Shermans anti-tank firepower equal to many of the German vehicles they encountered, particularly the Panzer IV and StuG III, but its gun was inferior to that of the Tiger or the Panther. The 76 mm could penetrate 125 mm (4.9 in) of unsloped RHA at 100 m (110 yd) and 106 mm (4.2 in) at 1,000 m (1,100 yd) using the usual M62 round. The M1 helped to equalize the Sherman and the Panzer IV in terms of firepower; the 48-caliber 7.5 cm KwK 40 (75 mm L/48) of the Panzer IV could penetrate 135 mm (5.3 in) of unsloped RHA at 100 m (110 yd) and 109 mm (4.3 in) at 1,000 m (1,100 yd). The 76 mm gun was still inferior to the much more powerful 70-caliber 7.5 cm KwK 42 (75 mm L/70) of the Panther, which could penetrate 185 mm (7.3 in) of unsloped RHA at 100 meters (110 yd) and 149 mm (5.9 in) at 1,000 m (1,100 yd) using the usual PzGr.39/42 round. The 76 mm was capable of knocking out a Panther at normal combat ranges from the flanks or rear but could not overcome the glacis plate. Due to its 55-degree slope, the Panther's 80 mm (3.1 in) glacis had a line-of-sight thickness of 140 mm (5.5 in) with actual effectiveness being even greater. An M4 might only knock out a Panther frontally from point-blank range by aiming for its turret front and transverse-cylindrical shaped mantlet, the lower edge of which on most Panthers (especially the earlier Ausf. D and A versions) constituted a vulnerable shot trap. A 76 mm-armed Sherman could penetrate the upper frontal hull superstructure of a Tiger I tank from normal combat ranges. Although the new gun lessened the gap between the two tanks, the Tiger I was still capable of knocking an M4 out frontally from over 2,000 m (2,200 yd).

In late summer 1944, after breaking out of the bocage and moving into open country, U.S. tank units that engaged German defensive positions at longer ranges sometimes took 50% casualties before spotting where the fire was coming from. The average combat range noted by the Americans for tank-versus-tank action was 800 to 900 m (870 to 980 yd). Sherman crews also had concerns about firing from longer ranges, as Sherman's high-flash powder made their shots easier to spot. This, and the U.S. Army's usual offensive tactical situation, often contributed to losses suffered by the U.S. Army in Europe. Even though the various gunsights fitted to the Sherman had fewer magnification settings than those fitted to German tanks, their gunners were able to use a secondary periscope that featured a far larger field of view than their German counterparts.

T4 High-Velocity Armor Piercing (HVAP) ammunition became available in September 1944 for the 76 mm gun. The projectile contained a tungsten penetrator surrounded by a lightweight aluminum body and ballistic windshield, which gave it a higher velocity and more penetrating power. The increased penetration of HVAP allowed the 76 mm gun to match the Panther's 7.5 cm KwK 42 APCR shot. However, its performance was heavily degraded by sloped armor such as the Panther's glacis. Because of tungsten shortages, HVAP rounds were constantly in short supply. Priority was given to U.S. tank destroyer units and over half of the 18,000 projectiles received were not compatible with the 76 mm gun M1, being fitted into the cartridge case of the M10 tank destroyer's 3-inch gun M7. Most Shermans carried only a few rounds at any one time, and some units never received any.

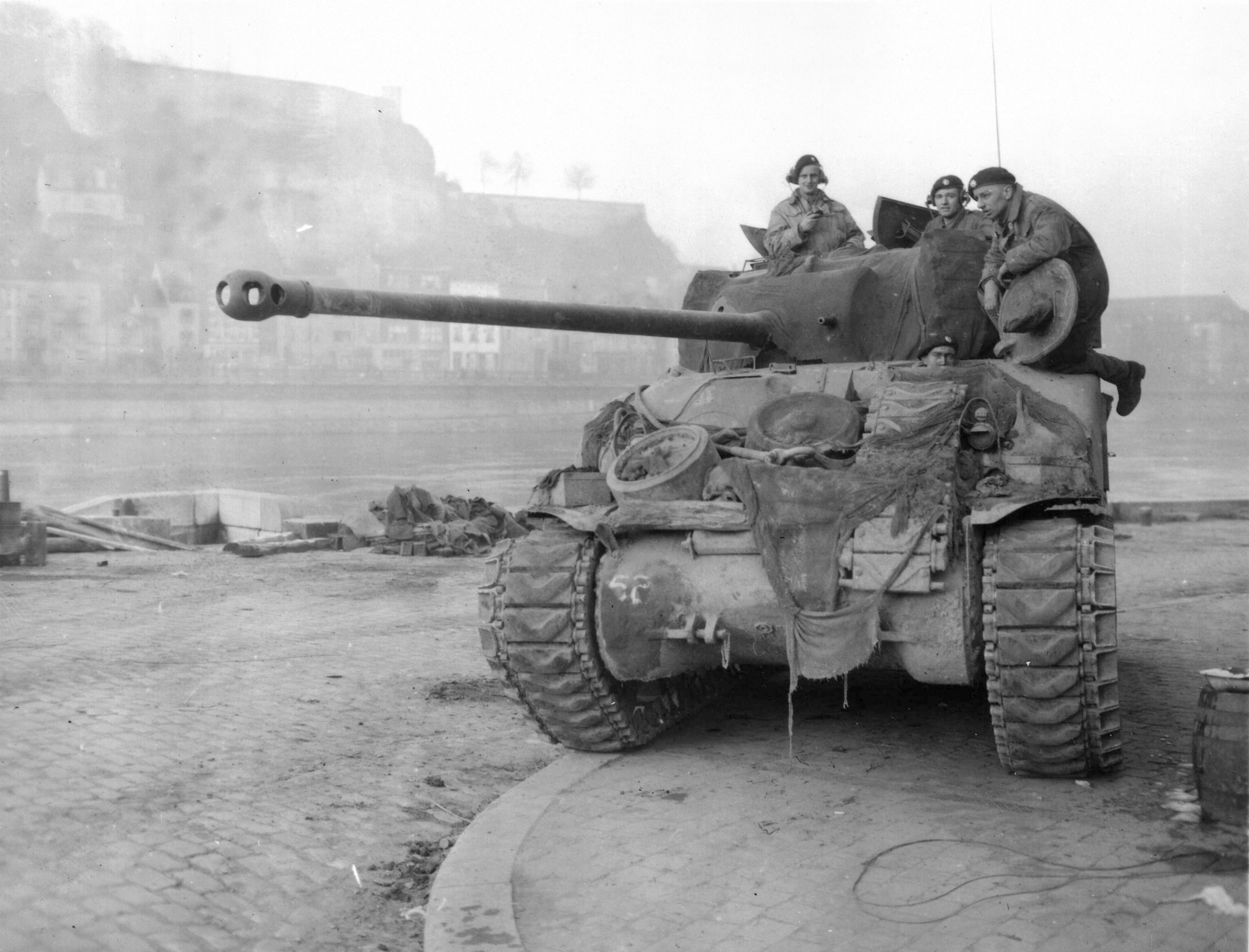
British Firefly in Namur, 1944. This is an M4 composite, showing the late cast hull front with large crew hatches

The British anticipated future developments in German armor and began development of a 3 in (76.2 mm) anti-tank gun even before its 57 mm predecessor entered service. Out of expediency and also driven by delays in their new tank designs, they mounted the powerful 76.2 mm Ordnance QF 17-pounder gun in a standard 75 mm M4 Sherman turret. This conversion became the Sherman Firefly. The U.S. M1 gun and the 17-pounder had nearly identical bore diameters, but the British piece used a more voluminous cartridge case containing a much bigger propellant charge. This allowed it to penetrate 174 mm (6.9 in) of unsloped RHA at 100 m (110 yd) and 150 mm (5.9 in) at 1,000 m (1,100 yd) using APCBC ammunition. The 17-pounder still could not penetrate the steeply sloped glacis plate of the Panther but it was expected to be able to pierce its gun mantlet at over 2,500 yd (2,300 m); moreover it was estimated it would defeat the Tiger I's frontal armor from 1,900 yd (1,700 m). However, British Army test results conducted with two Fireflys against a Panther turret-sized target demonstrated relatively poor accuracy at long range; a hit probability of 25.4% at 1,500 yd (1,400 m) with APCBC, and only 7.4% with APDS. In late 1943, the British offered the 17-pounder to the U.S. Army for use in their M4 tanks. General Devers insisted on comparison tests between the 17-pounder and the U.S. 90 mm gun. The tests were finally done on 25 March – 23 May 1944; they seemed to show the 90 mm gun was equal to or better than the 17-pounder. By then, production of the 76 mm-armed M4 and the 90 mm-armed M36 were both underway and U.S. Army interest in the 17-pounder waned. Late in 1944, the British began to produce tungsten sabot rounds for the 17-pounder, which could readily breach the armor of even the Tiger II; these were not as accurate as standard rounds and not generally available.

After the heavy tank losses of the Battle of the Bulge, in January 1945, General Eisenhower asked that no more 75 mm M4s be sent to Europe: only 76 mm M4s were wanted. Interest in mounting the British 17-pounder in U.S. Shermans flared anew. In February 1945, the U.S. Army began sending 75 mm M4s to England for conversion to the 17-pounder. Approximately 100 conversions were completed by the beginning of May. By then, the end of the war in Europe was clearly in sight, and the U.S. Army decided the logistical difficulties of adding a new ammunition caliber to the supply system was not warranted. None of the converted 17-pounder M4s was deployed in combat by the U.S., and it is unclear what happened to most of them, although some were given to the British as part of Lend-Lease post-war.

=== The tank destroyer doctrine ===
General Lesley J. McNair was head of the Army Ground Forces from 1942 to 1944. McNair, a former artilleryman, advocated for the role of the tank destroyer (TD) within the U.S. Army. In McNair's opinion, tanks were to exploit breakthroughs and support infantry, while masses of attacking hostile tanks were to be engaged by tank destroyer units, which were composed of a mix of self-propelled and towed anti-tank guns. Self-propelled tank destroyers, called "gun motor carriages" (as were any U.S. Army self-propelled armored vehicles mounting an artillery piece of heavy caliber), were similar to tanks but were lightly armored with open-topped turrets. The tank destroyers were supposed to be faster and carry a more powerful anti-tank gun than tanks (although in reality tanks often received more powerful guns before tank destroyers did) and armor was sacrificed for speed. Armored Force and Tank Destroyer Force doctrine were developed separately, and it was not against Armored Force doctrine for friendly tanks to engage hostile tanks that appeared while attacking or defending; tank destroyers were to engage numbers of enemy tanks that broke through friendly lines.

McNair approved the 76 mm upgrade to the M4 Sherman and production of the 90 mm gun-armed M36 tank destroyer, but he at first staunchly opposed mass production of the T20 medium tank series and its descendants, the T25 and T26 (which would eventually become the M26 Pershing) during the crucial period of 1943 because they did not meet the two criteria of the Army Ground Forces for accepting new equipment; they were not "battle worthy," and he saw no "battle need" for them. In fall 1943, Lieutenant General Devers, commander of U.S. forces in the European Theater of Operations (ETO), asked for 250 T26 tanks for use in the invasion of France; McNair refused, citing the fact that he believed the M4 was adequate. Devers appealed all the way to the War Department, and Major General Russell L. Maxwell, the Assistant Chief of Staff G-4 of the War Department General Staff, ordered the 250 tanks built in December 1943. McNair finally relented in his opposition, but still opposed mass production; his Army Ground Forces even asked for the tanks to be "down-gunned" from 90 mm to 75 or 76 mm in April 1944, believing the 76 mm gun was capable of performing satisfactorily. General George C. Marshall then summarily ordered the tanks to be provided to the ETO as soon as possible. Soon after the Normandy invasion in June 1944, General Dwight D. Eisenhower urgently requested heavy tanks, but McNair's continued opposition to mass production due to persistent serious mechanical problems with the vehicles delayed their procurement. That same month, the War Department reversed course and completely overruled the Army Ground Forces when making their tank production plan for 1945. 7,800 tanks were to be built, of which 2,060 were to be T26s armed with 90 mm guns, 2,728 were to be T26s armed with 105 mm howitzers and 3,000 were to be M4A3 Sherman tanks armed with 105 mm howitzers. As a part of the plan, the British requested 750 90 mm-armed T26s and 200 105 mm-armed T26s. General McNair was killed in a botched air support mission in July 1944, and the path to production for the T26 tank became somewhat clearer. General Marshall intervened again and the tanks were eventually brought into full production. However, only a few T26 tanks (by then designated M26) saw combat beginning in February 1945, too late to have any effect on the battlefield.

=== Variants ===
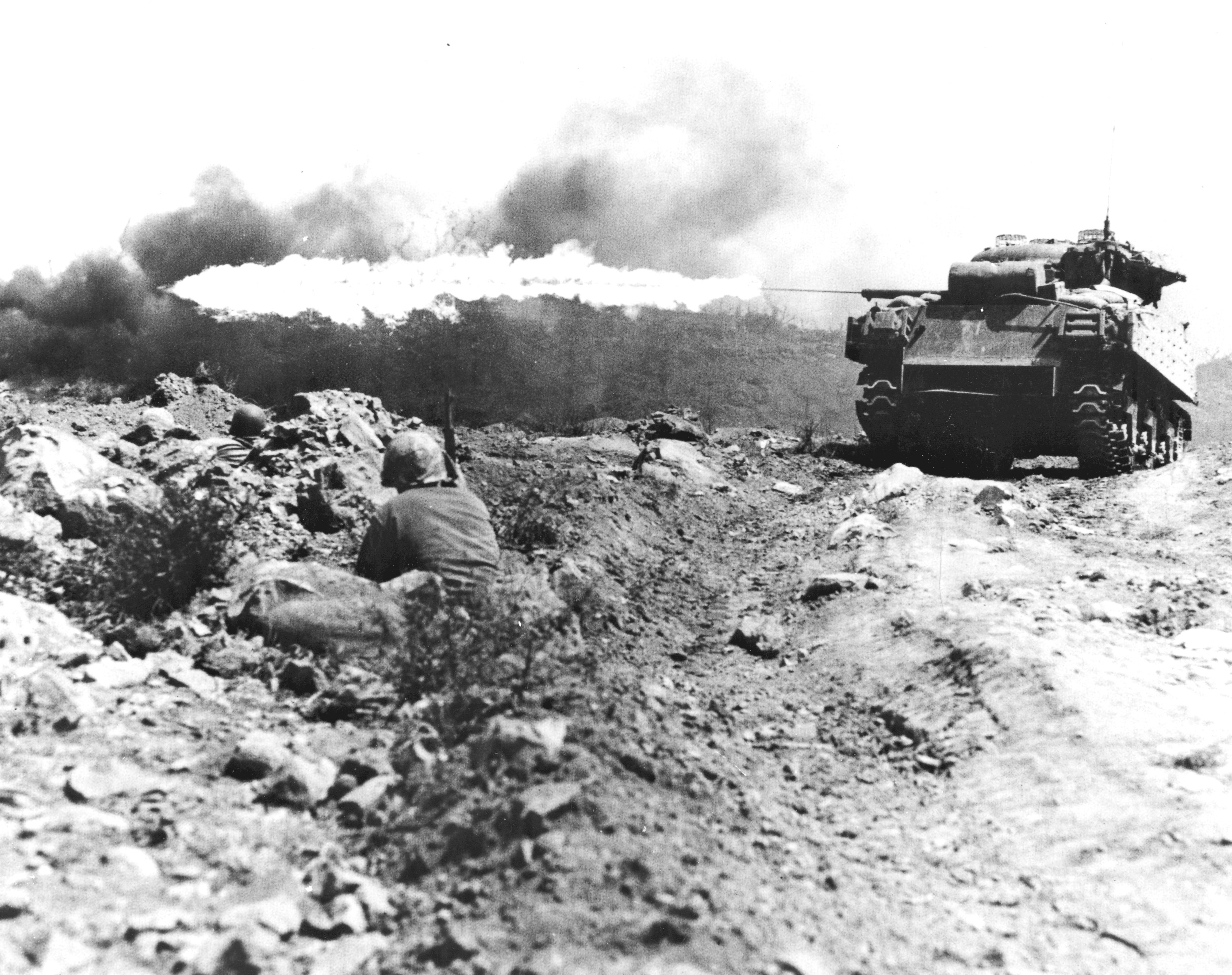
A USMC M4A3 uses its flame thrower during the Battle of Iwo Jima

The Sherman, like its M3 predecessor, was one of the first tanks to feature a gyroscopically stabilized gun and sight. The stabilization was only in the vertical plane; the mechanism could not slew the turret. The stabilizer was sufficient to keep the gun's elevation setting within 1/8th of a degree, or 2 mils, while crossing moderately rough terrain at 15 miles per hour (24 km/h). This gave a hit probability of 70% on enemy tanks at ranges of 300 yards (270 m) to 1,200 yards (1,100 m). The utility of the stabilization is debatable, with some saying it was useful for its intended purpose, others that it was useful only for using the sights for stabilized viewing on the move. Some operators disabled the stabilizer.

The 75 mm gun also had an effective canister round that functioned as a large shotgun. In the close fighting of the French bocage of Normandy, the U.S. Army's 2nd Armored Division tanks used Culin Hedgerow Cutters fitted to their tanks to push three tanks together through a hedgerow. The flank tanks would clear the back of the hedgerow on their side with canister rounds while the center tank would engage and suppress known or suspected enemy positions on the next hedgerow. This approach permitted surprisingly fast progress through the very tough and well-defended hedgerows in Normandy. Over 500 sets of these were fitted to US armored vehicles, and many fitted to various British tanks (where they were called "prongs").

The 75 mm gun had a white phosphorus shell originally intended for use as an artillery marker to help with targeting. M4 tank crews discovered that the shell could also be used against the Tiger and Panther—when the burning white phosphorus adhered to the German tanks, their excellent optics would be blinded and the acrid smoke would get sucked inside the vehicle, making it difficult or impossible for the crew to breathe. This, and the fear of fire starting or spreading inside the tank, would sometimes cause the crew to abandon the tank. There were several recorded instances where white phosphorus shells defeated German tanks in this fashion.

M4 Shermans armed with the 105 mm M4 howitzer were employed as a three-vehicle "assault gun" platoon under the tank battalion headquarters company along with another one in each medium tank company (a total of six tanks in the battalion) to provide close fire support and smoke. Armored infantry battalions were also eventually issued three of 105 mm Shermans in the headquarters company. The 105 mm-armed variants were issued the M67 high-explosive anti-tank (HEAT) round; although very effective the low muzzle velocity made hitting enemy armor difficult. The 105 mm Shermans were not equipped with a power-traversing turret, and this resulted in complaints from soldiers in the field. An upgrade was not available before the end of the war.

=== Secondary armament ===
The 2-inch smoke mortar M3, by loaders periscope, was aimed by pointing the tank's turret in the chosen direction.

The standard secondary armament was a .50 caliber (12.7 mm) M2 Browning HB machine gun with 300 rounds on a pintle mount on the turret roof for anti-aircraft protection, a .30 caliber M1919 Browning machine gun coaxial with the main gun with 4,750 rounds of ammunition, and a ball-mounted Browning M1919 A4 in the front hull operated by the assistant driver.

Early production models of the M4 and M4A1 also had a pair of fixed, forward firing M1919 machine guns mounted in the front hull and operated by the driver; this arrangement was inherited from the M2 and M3 medium tanks and was a result of a World War I requirement to be able to sweep the ground in front of an advancing tank with unaimed fire.

The M3 smoke mortar was incorporated (late 1943) into the roof of the Sherman turret.

Interior view of an M4A2 Sherman tank showing the bow gunner's station and machine gun installation

== Armor ==
=== Turret ===
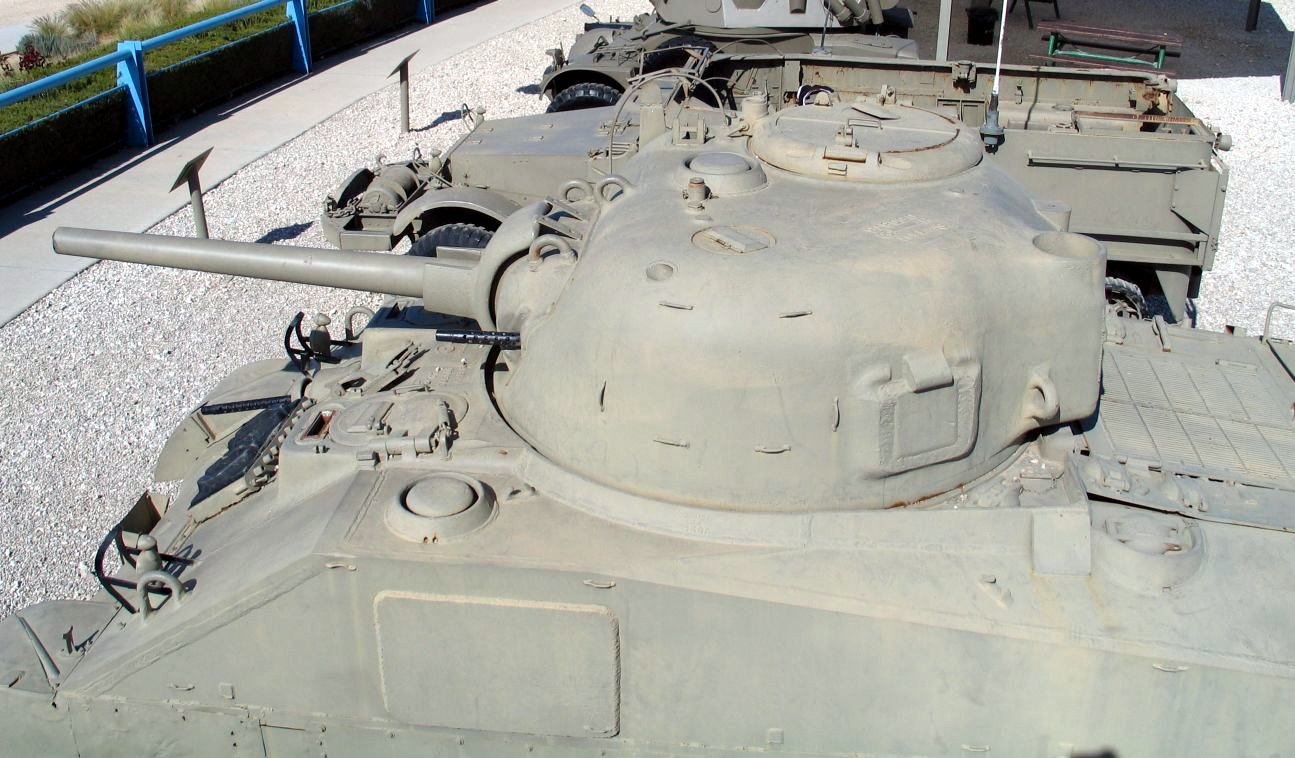
The D50878 turret has a single hatch.

Low Bustle Turret

The turret armor of the 75 mm and 105 mm armed M4 ranged from 25.4 mm (1.00 in) to 76.2 mm (3.00 in) thick. The turret front armor was 76.2 mm thick, angled at 30 degrees from the vertical, giving an effective thickness of 87.9 mm (3.46 in). The opening in the front of the M4's turret for the main gun was covered by a rounded 50.8 mm (2.00 in) thick rotor shield. Early Shermans that had a periscopic sight for the main gun mounted in the turret roof possessed a small 76.2 mm (3.00 in) thick mantlet that only covered the hole where the main gun barrel protruded; the exposed barrel of the coaxial machine gun was vulnerable to bullet splash or shrapnel and a small armored cover was manufactured to protect it. When the Sherman was later fitted with a telescopic sight next to the main gun, a larger 76.2 mm (3.00 in) thick gun mantlet that covered the entire rotor shield including the sight and coaxial machine gun barrel was produced. 105 mm-armed Sherman tanks did not have a rotor shield, possessing only the mantlet to cover the opening in the turret front. The turret side armor was 50.8 mm (2.00 in) thick at a 5-degree angle from the vertical. The turret rear armor was 50.8 mm (2.00 in) thick and vertical, while the turret roof armor was 25.4 mm (1.00 in) thick, and flat.

Later models of the M4A1, M4A2 and M4A3 Sherman tanks were equipped with the T80 turret developed for the T23 tank and the new 76 mm gun. This turret's armor was 63.5 mm (2.50 in) thick on the sides and rear, angled from 0 to 13 degrees from the vertical. It had a 25.4 mm (1.00 in) thick roof, which sat at 0 to 45 degrees from the vertical. The front of the T23 turret, which like the 105 mm-armed Sherman's turret, did not have a rotor shield, was protected by an unsloped 88.9 mm (3.50 in) thick cast gun mantlet. Combat experience indicated that the single hatch in the three-man 75 mm gun turret was inadequate for timely evacuation, so Ordnance added a loader's hatch beside the commander's beginning in late 1943. All 76 mm gun turrets had two roof hatches.

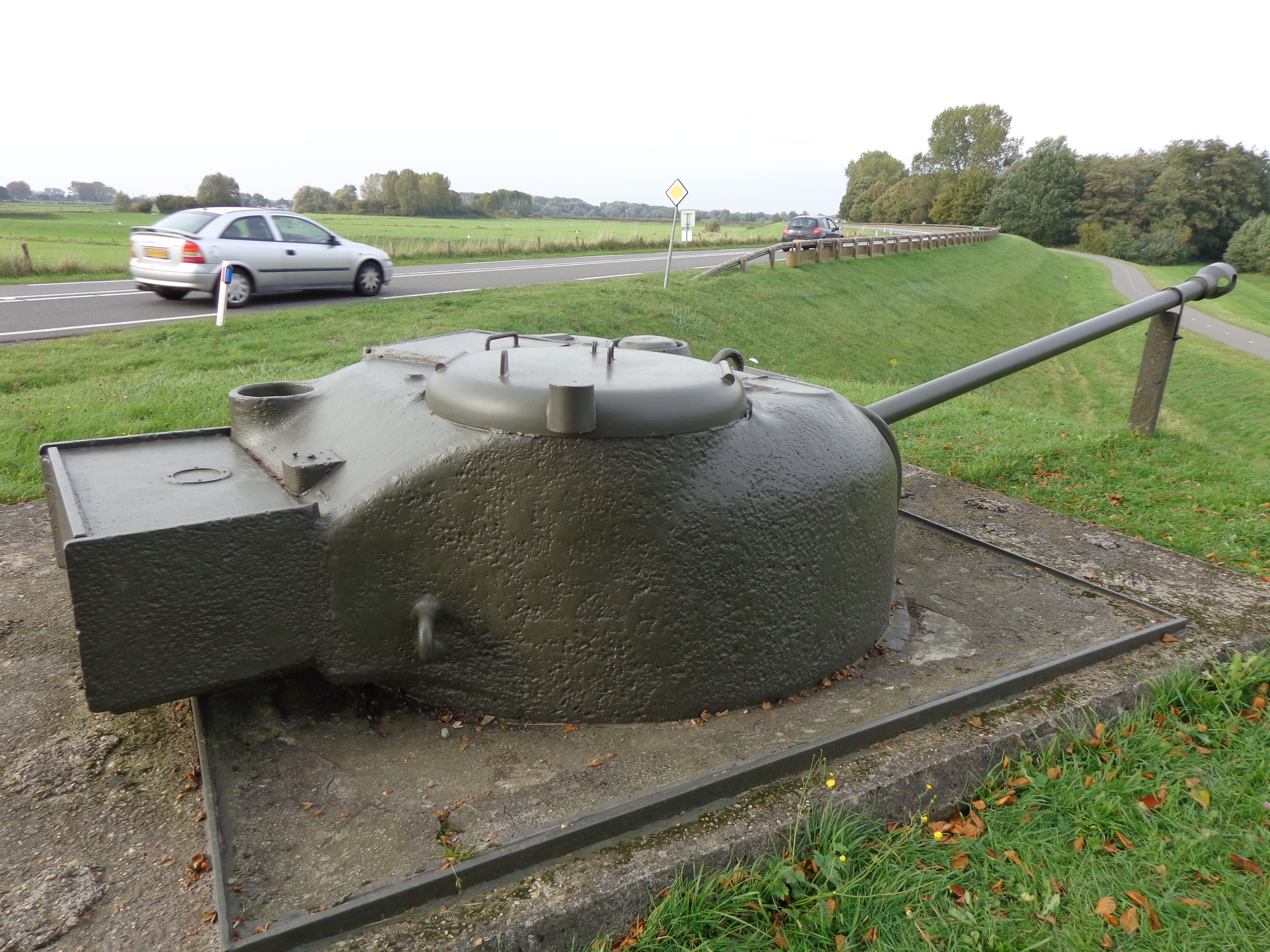
The Sherman Firefly added a bustle extension for the radio in order to fit the 17-pounder (76.2 mm gun.

later turret with two hatches]

=== Hull ===
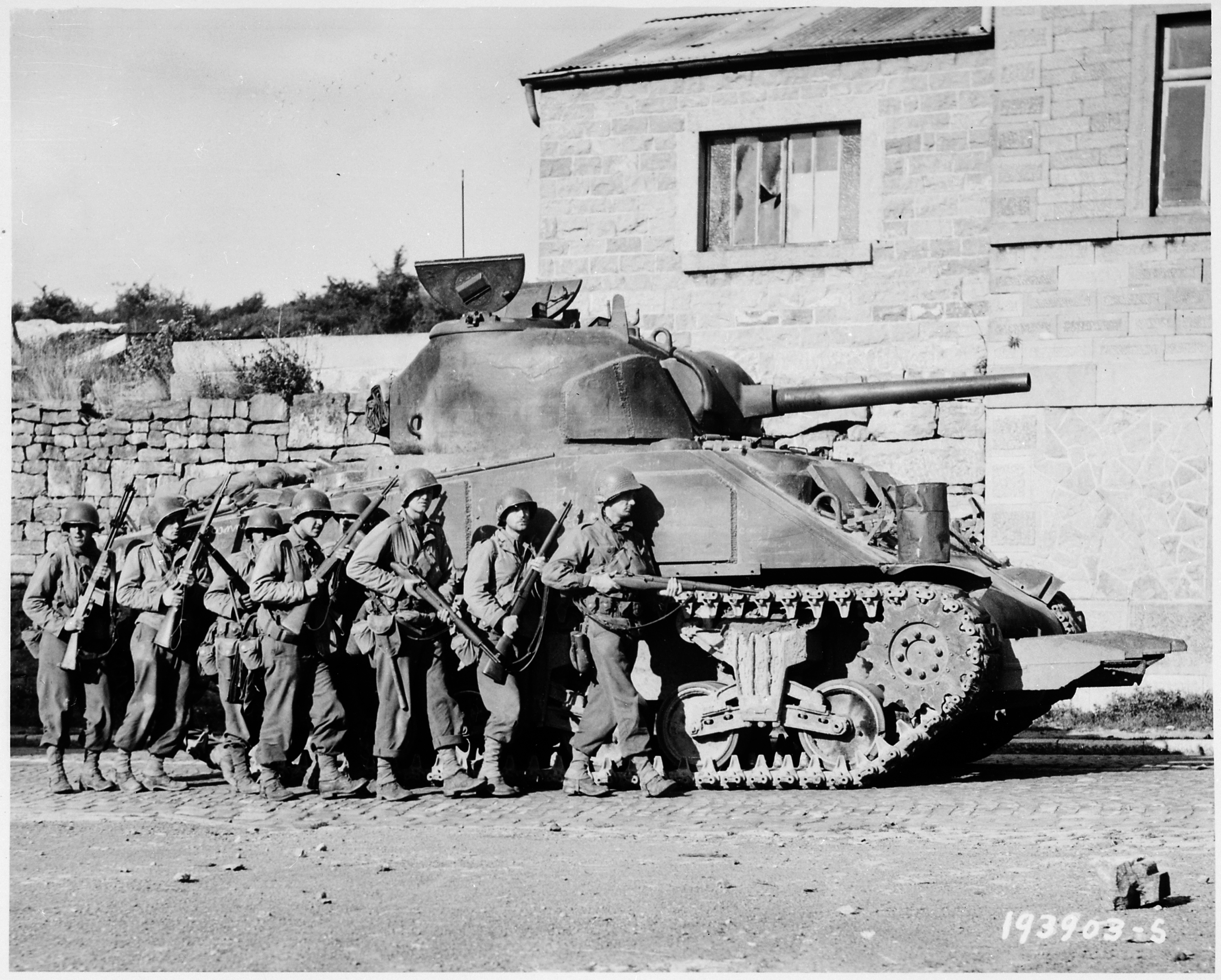
The 1943 improvement program added appliqué armor panels to the sides of the turret and hull. This Sherman also has a Culin hedgerow cutter, a 1944 field improvisation for breaking through the thick hedgerows of the Normandy bocage

The Sherman's glacis plate was originally 50.8 mm (2.00 in) thick. and angled at 56 degrees from the vertical, providing an effective thickness of 90.8 mm (3.57 in). The M4, M4A1, early production M4A2, and early production M4A3 possessed protruding cast "hatchway" structures that allowed the driver and assistant driver's hatches to fit in front of the turret ring. In these areas, the effect of the glacis plate's slope was greatly reduced. Later Shermans had an upgraded glacis plate that was uniformly 63.5 mm (2.50 in) thick and sloped at 47 degrees from the vertical, providing an effective thickness of 93.1 mm (3.67 in) over the entire plate. The new design improved overall ballistic protection by eliminating the "hatchways", while also allowing for larger hatches for the driver and bow gunner. The cast hull M4A1 for the most part retained its previous glacis shape even after the larger hatches were introduced; the casting, irrespective of the larger hatches, sat 37 to 55 degrees from the vertical, with the large majority of the piece sitting closer to a 55-degree angle.

The transmission housing was rounded, made of three cast sections bolted together or cast as one piece. It ranged from 50.8–108 millimeters (2–4 1/4 in) thick. The upper and lower hull sides were 38 mm (1.5 in) thick, and vertical, while the upper hull rear was also 38 mm (1.5 in) thick, vertical or sloped at 10 degrees from the vertical. The lower hull rear, which protected the engine, was 38 mm (1.5 in) thick, sloped at 0 to 22 degrees from the vertical depending upon the variant. The hull roof was 25.4 mm (1.00 in). The hull floor ranged from 25.4 mm (1.00 in) thick under the driver and assistant driver's positions to 12.7 mm (0.50 in) thick at the rear. The M4 had a hatch on the hull bottom to dispose of spent shell casings and to provide an emergency escape route. In the Pacific, Marines often used this Sherman feature in reverse to recover wounded infantry under fire.

=== Effectiveness ===
The armor of the Sherman was ineffective against most Axis tanks (such as tanks like the Panzer IV with 7.5 cm cannon and above) along with anti-tank weapon fire early in the war during multiple occasions. So it was decided it needed a compound angle to resist later German tank and anti-tank guns. The distinctive protruding "hatchways" of the early Sherman compromised the 56 degree-angled glacis plate, making them weak points where the effect of the glacis plate's slope was greatly reduced. In 1943, to make the thickness of these areas equal with the rest of the glacis plate, 1-inch-thick (25 mm) appliqué armor plates were fitted in front of them.

A Waffenamt-Prüfwesen 1 report estimated that with the M4 angled 30 degrees sideways and APCBC round, the Tiger I's 8.8 cm KwK 36 L/56 gun would be capable of penetrating the differential case of an American M4 Sherman from 2,100 m (6,900 ft) and the turret front from 1,800 m (5,900 ft), but the Tiger's 88 mm gun would not penetrate the upper glacis plate at any range and that the Panther, with its long-barreled 7.5 cm KwK 42 L/70, would have to close in to 100 m (110 yd) to achieve a penetration in the same situation. However, other German documents suggested that the glacis of a Sherman could be penetrated at a range of 800 m (2,600 ft) by the Tiger I. The Tiger I was estimated to be able to penetrate the Sherman in most other armor plates at a range of 2 km (1.2 mi) or above, far exceeding the ranges at which the tank itself was vulnerable to fire from the Sherman.

Although the later-model German medium and heavy tanks were greatly feared, Buckley opined "The vast majority of German tanks encountered in Normandy were either inferior or merely equal to the Sherman." (Panzer III or Panzer IV)

Research for tank casualties in Normandy from 6 June to 10 July 1944 conducted by the British No. 2 Operational Research Section concluded that from a sample of 40 Sherman tanks, 33 tanks burned (82 percent) and 7 tanks remained unburned following an average of 1.89 penetrations. In comparison, from a sample of five Panzer IVs, four tanks burned (80 percent) and one tank remained unburned, following an average of 1.5 penetrations. The Panther tank burned 14 times (63 percent) from a sample of 22 tanks and following 3.24 penetrations, while the Tiger burned four times (80 percent) out of a sample of five tanks following 3.25 penetrations. John Buckley, using a case study of the British 8th and 29th Armoured Brigades, found that of their 166 Shermans knocked out in combat during the Normandy campaign, 94 (56.6 percent) burned out. Buckley also notes that an American survey carried out concluded that 65% of tanks burned out after being penetrated. United States Army research proved that the major reason for this was the stowage of main gun ammunition in the vulnerable sponsons above the tracks. A U.S. Army study in 1945 concluded that only 10–15 percent of wet stowage Shermans burned when penetrated, compared to 60–80 percent of the older dry-stowage Shermans. As a burned tank was unrecoverable, it was prudent in combat to continue to fire at a tank until it caught fire.

At first, a partial remedy to ammunition fires in the M4 was found in 1943 by welding 1-inch-thick (25 mm) appliqué armor plates to the sponson sides over the ammunition stowage bins, though there was doubt that these had any effect. Later models moved ammunition stowage to the hull floor, with water jackets surrounding each storage bin. The practice, known as "wet stowage", reduced the chance of fire after a hit to about 15 percent. The Sherman allegedly gained the grim nickname "Tommy Cooker" (by the Germans, who referred to British soldiers as "Tommies"; a tommy cooker was a World War I-era trench stove), though no evidence appears to exist beyond anecdote on the Allied side and post-war. Conversely, it was also allegedly called "Ronson" or "Zippo" due to the flamethrower version of the tank, and not because "it lights the first time, every time"; this nickname story has been almost conclusively proven to be a fabrication as the Ronson company did not begin using the slogan until the 1950s and the average soldier did not have a Ronson lighter. Fuel fires occasionally occurred, but such fires were far less common and less deadly than ammunition fires. In many cases, the fuel tank of the Sherman was found intact after a fire. Tankers described "fierce, blinding jets of flame", which is consistent with burning pressurized hydraulic fluid, but not gasoline-related fires.

=== Overview ===
Comparisons can be drawn between the T-34 and the U.S. M4 Sherman tank. Both tanks were the backbone of the armored units in their respective armies, both nations distributed these tanks to their allies, who also used them as the mainstay of their own armored formations, and both were upgraded extensively and fitted with more powerful guns. Both were designed for mobility and ease of manufacture and maintenance, sacrificing some performance for these goals. Both chassis were used as the foundation for a variety of support vehicles, such as armor recovery vehicles, tank destroyers, and self-propelled artillery. Both were an approximately even match for the standard German medium tank, the Panzer IV, though each of these three tanks had particular advantages and weaknesses compared with the other two. Neither the T-34 nor the M4 was a match for Germany's heavier tanks, the Panther (technically a medium tank) or the Tiger I; the Soviets used the IS-2 heavy tank and the U.S. used the M26 Pershing as the heavy tanks of their forces instead.

=== Upgrades ===
Upgrades included the rectangular armor patches protecting ammunition stowage mentioned above, and smaller armor patches in front of each of the protruding hatchway structures in the glacis in an attempt to mitigate their ballistic weakness. Field improvisations included placing sandbags, spare track links, concrete, wire mesh, or even wood for increased protection against shaped-charge rounds. While mounting sandbags around a tank had little effect against high-velocity anti-tank gunfire it was thought to provide standoff protection against HEAT weapons, primarily the German Panzerfaust anti-tank grenade launcher and the 88 mm caliber Panzerschreck anti-tank rocket launcher. In the only study known to have been done to test the use of sandbags, on 9 March 1945, officers of the 1st Armored Group tested standard Panzerfaust 60s against sandbagged M4s; shots against the side blew away the sandbags and still penetrated the side armor, whereas shots fired at an angle against the front plate blew away some of the sandbags but failed to penetrate the armor. Earlier, in the summer of 1944, General Patton, informed by his ordnance officers that sandbags were useless, and that the machines' chassis suffered from the extra weight, had forbidden the use of sandbags. Following the clamor for better armor and firepower after the losses of the Battle of the Bulge, Patton ordered extra armor plates salvaged from knocked-out American and German tanks welded to the turrets and hulls of tanks of his command. Approximately 36 of this up-armored M4s were supplied to each of the three armored divisions of the Third Army in the spring of 1945.

==== M4A3E2 ====
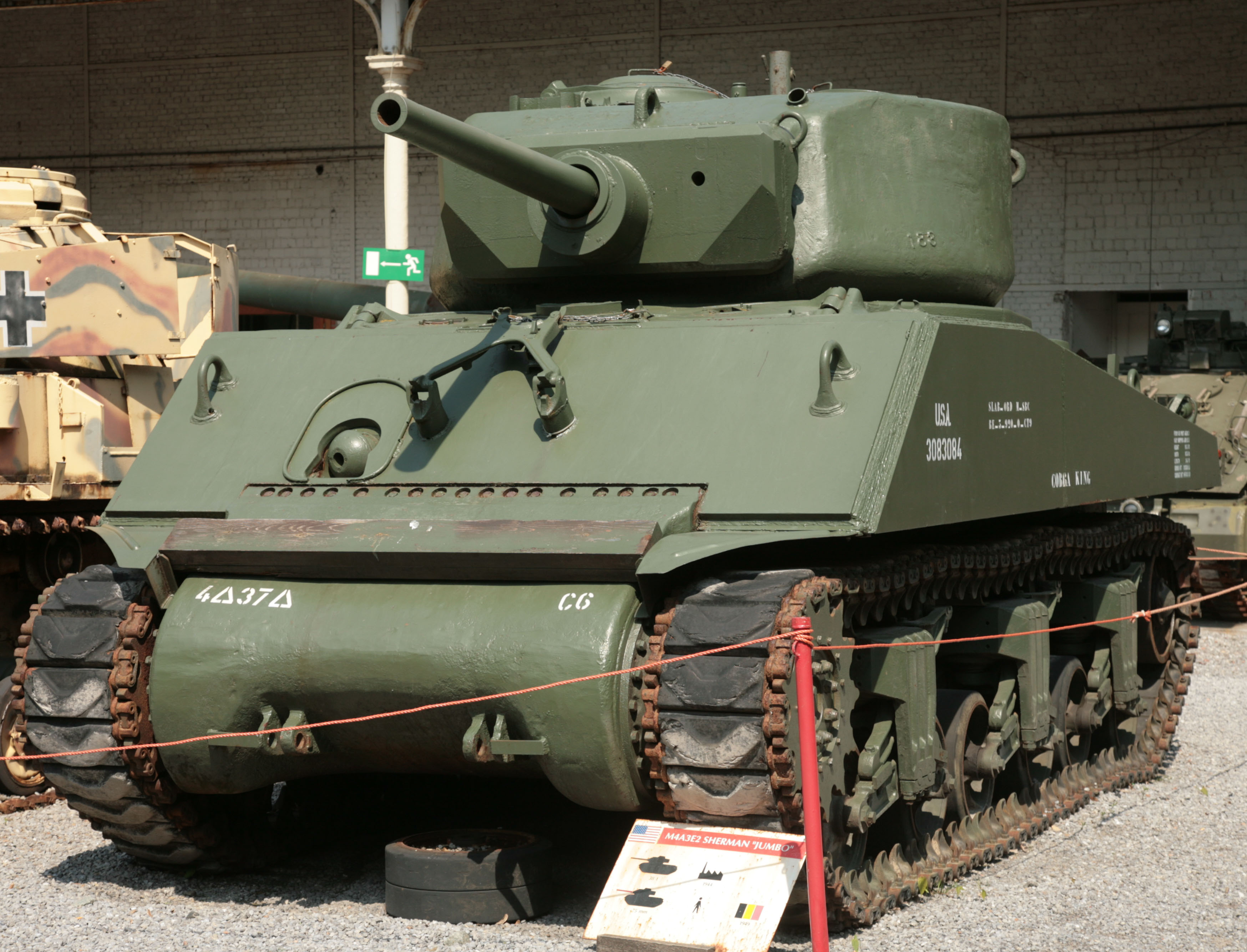
M4A3E2 Sherman Jumbo, Royal Museum of the Armed Forces and Military History, Brussels

The M4A3E2 Sherman "Jumbo" assault tank variant, based upon a standard M4A3(75)W hull, had an additional 38 mm (1.5 in) plate welded to the glacis, giving a total thickness of 102 mm (4.0 in), which resulted in a glacis of 149 mm (5.9 in) line-of-sight thickness, and over 180 mm (7.1 in) effective thickness. The sponson sides had 38 mm (1.5 in) thick plates welded on, to make them 76 mm (3.0 in) thick. The transmission cover was significantly thicker, and a new, more massive T23-style turret with 178 mm (7.0 in) of armor on the sides and rear and a 25.4 mm (1 in) thick flat roof. The gun mantlet had an additional 89 mm (3.5 in) of armor welded on giving a total thickness of 177.8 mm. It was originally to be armed with the 76 mm gun, but the 75 mm was preferred for infantry support and was used, although some were later upgraded to use the 76 mm. The higher weight required changing the transmission gear ratios to reduce maximum speed to 22 mph, and crews were warned not to let the suspension "bottom" too violently. In order to compensate for the extra weight of the tank duckbill extended end connectors were added on the outside of the track, increasing its width and keeping ground pressure at 14psi. 254 were built at the Fisher Tank Arsenal from May to July 1944, and arrived in Europe in the fall of 1944, being employed throughout the remainder of the fighting in various roles. They were considered "highly successful".

== Mobility ==
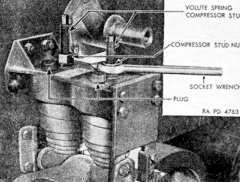
Vertical volute springs of Stuart tank with similar suspension system

In its initial specifications for a replacement for the M3 medium tank, the U.S. Army restricted Sherman's height, width, and weight so that it could be transported via typical bridges, roads, railroads, and landing craft without special accommodation. Army Regulation 850-15 initially restricted the widths of a tank to 103 inches (2.62 m) and its weight to 30 tons (27.2 t). This greatly aided the strategic, logistical, and tactical flexibility and mobility of all Allied armored forces using the Sherman.

A long-distance service trial conducted in Britain in 1943 compared diesel and gasoline Shermans to Cromwell tanks (Rolls-Royce Meteor engine) and Centaur (Liberty L-12). The British officer commanding the trial concluded:

They are utterly reliable. ... I do not think they are quite as good as the Cromwell across the country when they are running on rather worn rubber tracks and the going is greasy, neither does one get as smooth a ride, but they appear so infinitely superior in every other way particularly in reliability with a minimum of maintenance that this cross-country consideration is completely overweighed.

The Sherman had good speed both on and off-road. Off-road performance varied. In the desert, the Sherman's rubber-block tracks performed well, and in the confined, hilly terrain of Italy, the smaller, nimbler Sherman could often cross terrain that some heavy German tanks could not. Albert Speer recounted in his autobiography Inside the Third Reich:

On the southwestern front (Italy) reports on the cross-country mobility of the Sherman have been very favorable. The Sherman climbs mountains our tank experts consider inaccessible to tanks. One great advantage is that the Sherman has a very powerful motor in proportion to its weight. Its cross-country mobility on level ground is, as the 26th Panzer Division reports, definitely superior to that of our tanks.

However, while this may have held compared with the first-generation German tanks, such as the Panzer III and Panzer IV, comparative testing with the second generation wide-tracked German tanks (Panther and Tiger) conducted by the Germans at their Kummersdorf testing facility, as well as by the U.S. 2nd Armored Division, proved otherwise. The M4's initial tracks were 16.5 inches wide. This produced ground pressure of 14 pounds per square inch. U.S. crews found that on soft ground, the narrow tracks of the Sherman gave poorer ground pressure compared to the Panther and Tiger.

Because of their wider tracks and use of the characteristic Schachtellaufwerk interleaved and overlapped road wheels (as used on pre-war origin German half-track vehicles), the Panther and Tiger had greater mobility on soft ground because of their greater flotation (i.e., lower ground pressure). Lieutenant Colonel Wilson M. Hawkins of the 2nd Armored Division wrote the following comparing the U.S. M4 Sherman and the German Panther in a report to Allied headquarters:

It has been claimed that our tank is the more maneuverable. In recent tests, we put a captured German Mark V [Panther] against all models of our own. The German tank was the faster, both across the country and on the highway, and could make sharper turns. It was also the better hill climber.

This was backed up in an interview with Technical Sergeant Willard D. May of the 2nd Armored Division who commented: "I have taken instructions on the Mark V [Panther] and have found, first, it is easily as maneuverable as the Sherman; second the flotation exceeds that of the Sherman."

Staff Sergeant and tank platoon sergeant Charles A. Carden completes the comparison in his report:

The Mark V [Panther] and VI [Tiger] in my opinion have more maneuverability and certainly more flotation. I have seen in many cases where the Mark V and VI tanks could maneuver nicely over ground where the M4 would bog down. On one occasion I saw at least 10 Royal Tigers [Tiger II] make a counterattack against us over ground that for us was nearly impassable.

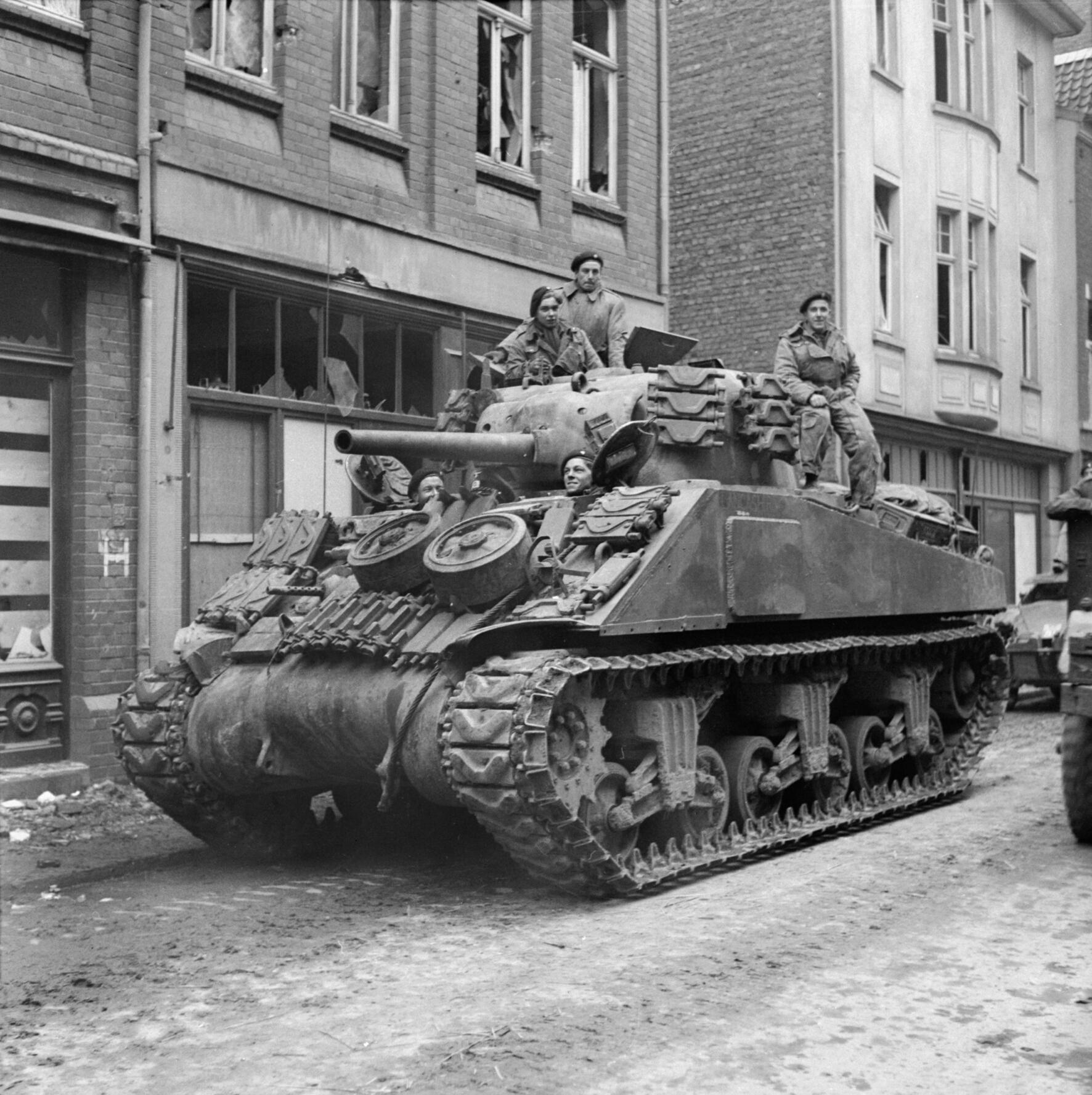
A Sherman with track widening "duckbill" extended end connectors

The U.S. Army issued extended end connectors ("duckbills") to add width to the standard tracks as a stopgap solution. Duckbills began to reach front-line tank battalions in fall 1944 but were original factory equipment for the heavy M4A3E2 Jumbo to compensate for the extra weight of armor. The M4A3(76)W HVSS Shermans and other late models with wider-tracked suspensions corrected these problems but formed only a small proportion of the tanks in service even in 1945.

== Reliability ==
=== M4A1 ===
In September 1942 the British developed some potential improvements and tested the tanks.

After 805 km (500 mi) the springs of the left front bogie broke, considered typical for this type of suspension. Oil also accumulated on the floor of the engine compartment during driving. The engine periodically stalled under high load due to interrupted fuel supply. It was found that the engine had been built and installed incorrectly. Upon disassembly carbon deposits were found on the working surfaces of the cylinders; they were very worn out after only 65 hours of operation or 702 miles (1,130 km) run. In the absence of a replacement by 10 October, the engine was put back in the tank; the revised fuel system was supposed to improve the stalling engine.

In November 1943, several M4A1 Shermans were tested at the American proving ground to test British innovations. On one of them, 37 experimental changes were made, on the second – 47, on the third – 53. In total, 60 changes were developed and implemented for the Shermans, most of which were considered successful after a 600-mile run and firing.

=== M4A2 ===
In Africa, the British engines ran for 700–900 miles (1130–1450 km), or 180–200 hours. The engine had to be inspected and repaired after 100 hours, which significantly extended its service life, but there was not enough time for such work, and among crews, it was believed that there was little benefit in the procedure. The engine left much to be desired, as evidenced by attempts at modifications in the Eighth Army, which did not affect the reliability of the tank. The Shermans also had other defects, including broken wiring, breaking ignition coils, and clutch rods.

The improved return roller design performed much better than that which the early Sherman production inherited from the M3. A February 1943 report described a unit where there were no broken bogey coil springs even after a 1,000-mile (1,600 km) march. The tracks however suffered; the rubber flaked off and after a run of 600 miles (970 km) the tracks were unusable. Some units rode on tracks without the rubber pads, but the rubber tires of the rollers wore down faster. The introduction of radially grooved tires helped to cope with overheating when driving fast in the desert, but de-lamination of the tires still led to cracks in the rollers after 300 miles (480 km).

The M4A2 performed very well in hot climates in general. The British sent as many of these as possible to the Mediterranean theater, retaining a minimum of vehicles for training in the UK. Complaints began to come in about carbon fouling of the injectors due to oil getting into the combustion chamber.

Other mechanical problems were rare and were most common in the left engine. Shermans suffered from wear to tire trackpads which were mitigated by changing to all-metal tracks and ventilated rollers. The tanks proved to be very reliable with proper operation. In June 1943, it was noted that the average service life was estimated at 1,500 miles (2,400 km). The M4A2 was rated "very high", while the M4A1 was rated "high".

The Soviet 6th Guards Tank Army determined the lifespan of their M4A2 Shermans to be 2,000 to 2,500 km (1,200 to 1,600 mi) or 250–300 hours, comparable to the T-34.

=== M4A3 ===
The Ford V-8 engined M4A3s took part in the 1943 'survival' race. On average, the engines worked for 255 hours, though one failed after 87 hours of running. Three tanks were taken out of the test at 187, 247, and 295 operating hours due to reasons unrelated to the engine. The report noted that even disqualified motors could be returned to service by replacing only one part: the rest were still in excellent condition. Of all the Ford engines, it turned out to be the most service friendly. The M4A3 tanks covered a greater distance than other Shermans: ten vehicles covered 20,346 miles (32,743 km) in total (half on-the-road, half off-road) over 2,388 hours - an impressive achievement.

The M4A3 continued to lead to reliability through further testing. On tests in the winter and spring of 1944, one tank covered 2,097 mi (3,375 km) in 203 hours and 25 minutes. An M4 failed after only 15 hours and 10 minutes and was replaced by another. The M4A1 lasted 27 hours 15 minutes, and the M4A4 covered 1,343 miles (2,161 km) in 149 hours and 35 minutes.

Around the same time, another reliability test began, albeit on a smaller scale of 20 Shermans of various types including four M4A3. The time spent on repairs was carefully measured: on average, the M4A3 took 110 hours to service the engine, which was better than the M4A1 (132 hours) or M4A2 (143 hours), but more than double the average of 45 hours on maintenance of the Chrysler multibank by M4A4 crews. M4A3 remained superior in transmission time: 112 hours versus 340 hours for the M4A4. In terms of suspension, the tanks turned out to be approximately equal. None of the tanks with Ford engines passed the entire route: they dropped out after 293, 302, 347, and 350 hours of running. Only three Chrysler engines and one General Motors diesel engine coped with the task.

Although M4A3s were not in service with other armies, some were supplied to the Allies for review. In early January 1943, a new M4A3 was provided to the British Fighting Vehicle Proving Establishment. By 16 January, it began trials. The engine failed after 495 miles (800 km). A new engine was delivered by the end of February. This gave more power and better performance and despite multiple problems, the tank achieved 2,000 miles (3,220 km). The British considered the M4A3 a very reliable tank but far from perfect. An upgraded vehicle was tested in the spring of 1944; it covered over 3,000 miles (4,863 km) through several defects accumulated over the course of the run. The M4A3 was considered an outstanding vehicle for its reliability.

=== M4A4 ===
In October 1942, five M3A4s and five M4A4s were tested in the California desert, which was a monstrous test for vehicles with an unsatisfactory cooling system. Constant breakdowns of auxiliary engine units put an end to the tank's combat career in the US Army. By the spring of 1943, the recommendations given by the Armored Council had been implemented, and 10 M4A4 tanks had been driven to a 4,000-miles (6,440 km) range. The average service life of the A57 engine reached 240 hours. M4A4 tanks took second place in reliability after the M4A3 with a Ford GAA engine (255 hours), ahead of diesel M4A2 (225 hours) and M4A1 radial (218 hours). The M4A4 was the easiest to maintain.

Additional tests of four M4A4s from 8 October 1943, to 14 February 1944, showed even better results: one engine broke down after 339 hours, three others worked 400 hours with less than 10% power loss. 3 out of 4 M4A4 could finish the Armored Council test and drive for 4,000-miles (6,440 km).

Despite the positive outcomes of additional testing, oil and fuel consumption was still too high for the engine to be recommended for service in the American army. Production of the M4A4 was discontinued on 10 October 1943, and it was declared obsolete in 1945.

=== Engine ===
The M4 Sherman used four different engines, each of a very different type. Diesel M4A2s had a significant superiority over the R975 gasoline engines. The first M4A3 tank with a Ford GAA V8 gasoline engine, surpassing the R975 in all aspects, was assembled in May 1942, and even the M4A4 had a more reliable engine.

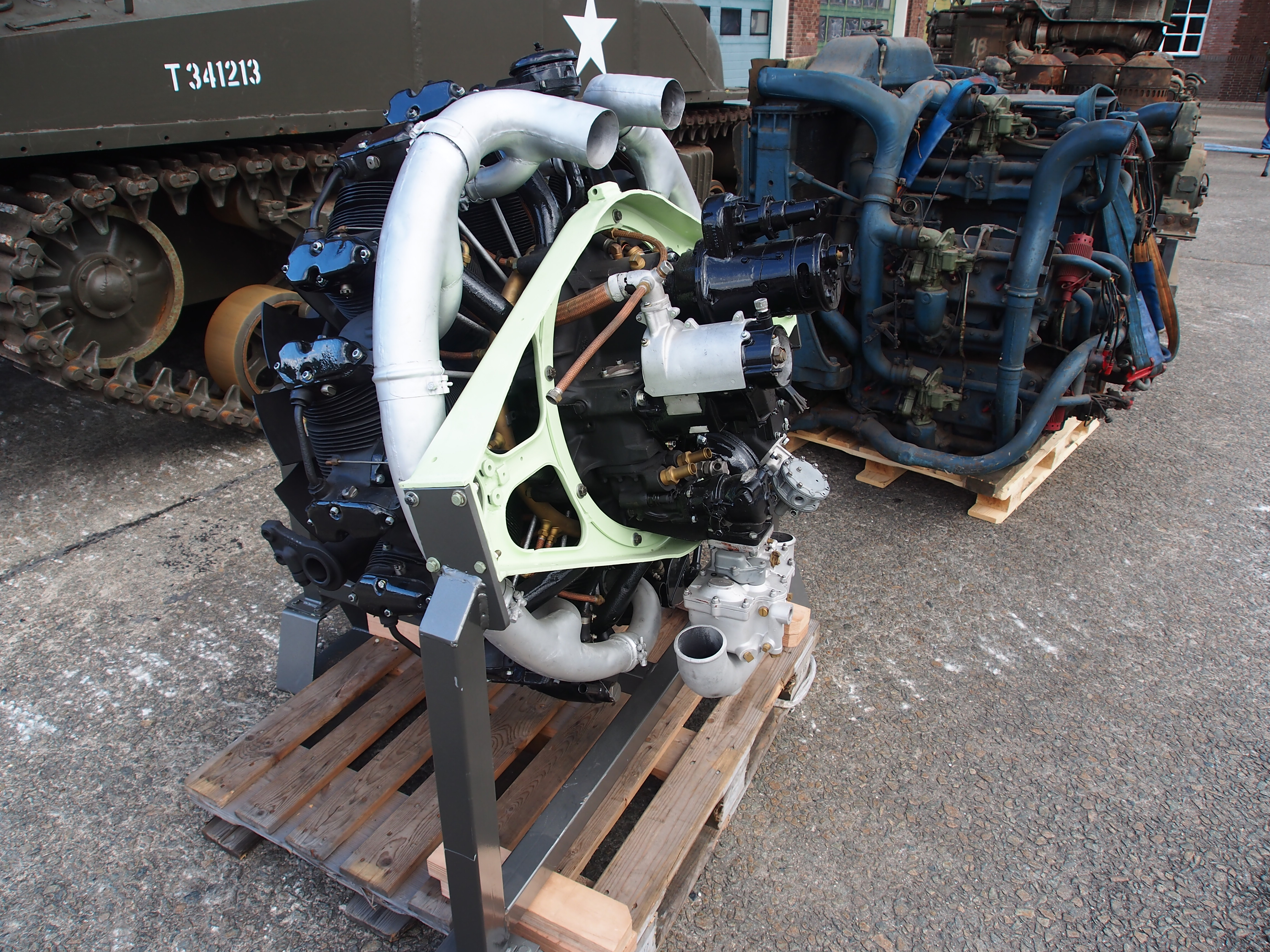
Continental R975 aircraft engine used in M4A1

The R975 engine began to lose relevance once the vehicle was put into service. The R975 was initially powered by high-octane aviation gasoline. With the entry of the United States into the war, it was necessary to change to a lower grade fuel. To maintain performance, the maximum octane number of fuel for the new engine was limited to 80. In April 1942, an engine with a compression ratio of 5.7 was tested, which was considered acceptable. The nominal revs increased from 1200 to 1800 per minute. The new engine used a richer fuel mixture and had a larger combustion chamber.

Engines were compared in large-scale tests at the Aberdeen Proving Grounds in the winter of 1943–1944 with four examples each of M4A1, M4A2, M4A3, and M4A4. The endpoint was 4,000 miles or 400 hours run time. Faults with anything except the motor were repaired and testing resumed; only critical damage or loss of a third of its original power took the engine out of the competition.

During the tests, it took 132 hours to service the R-975 in the M4A1, 143 hours for the GM diesel M4A2, 110 hours for the Ford GAA M4A3, and 45 hours for the multibank M4A4. None of the R975 engines reached the 200 hours mark, failing on average after 166 hours. (Note: The M4A1 tank also required an average of 36 hours of transmission maintenance, 93 hours of chassis maintenance, and a little over 20 hours of other maintenance.) It was noted that a lot of time was spent on servicing the air filters for the R-975; over 23 days of testing, 446 man-hours were spent on cleaning and repairing them.

An M4 with the R975-C1 engine was tested a year later over a 5,000-mile (8,050 km) test in which the engine had to be replaced three times. In addition, there were transmission and suspension problems. The filters performed poorly: it was noted that sand and dust severely spoil the engine and other units.

Work to improve the reliability of the R975 engine led to quite significant changes, resulting in the R975-C4. Engine power increased from 432 to 493 hp (322 to 368 kW), and fuel consumption decreased by 10%. The engine torque went from 1800 Nm at 1900 pm to 2040 Nm. Older engines were upgraded to the later model during a major overhaul.

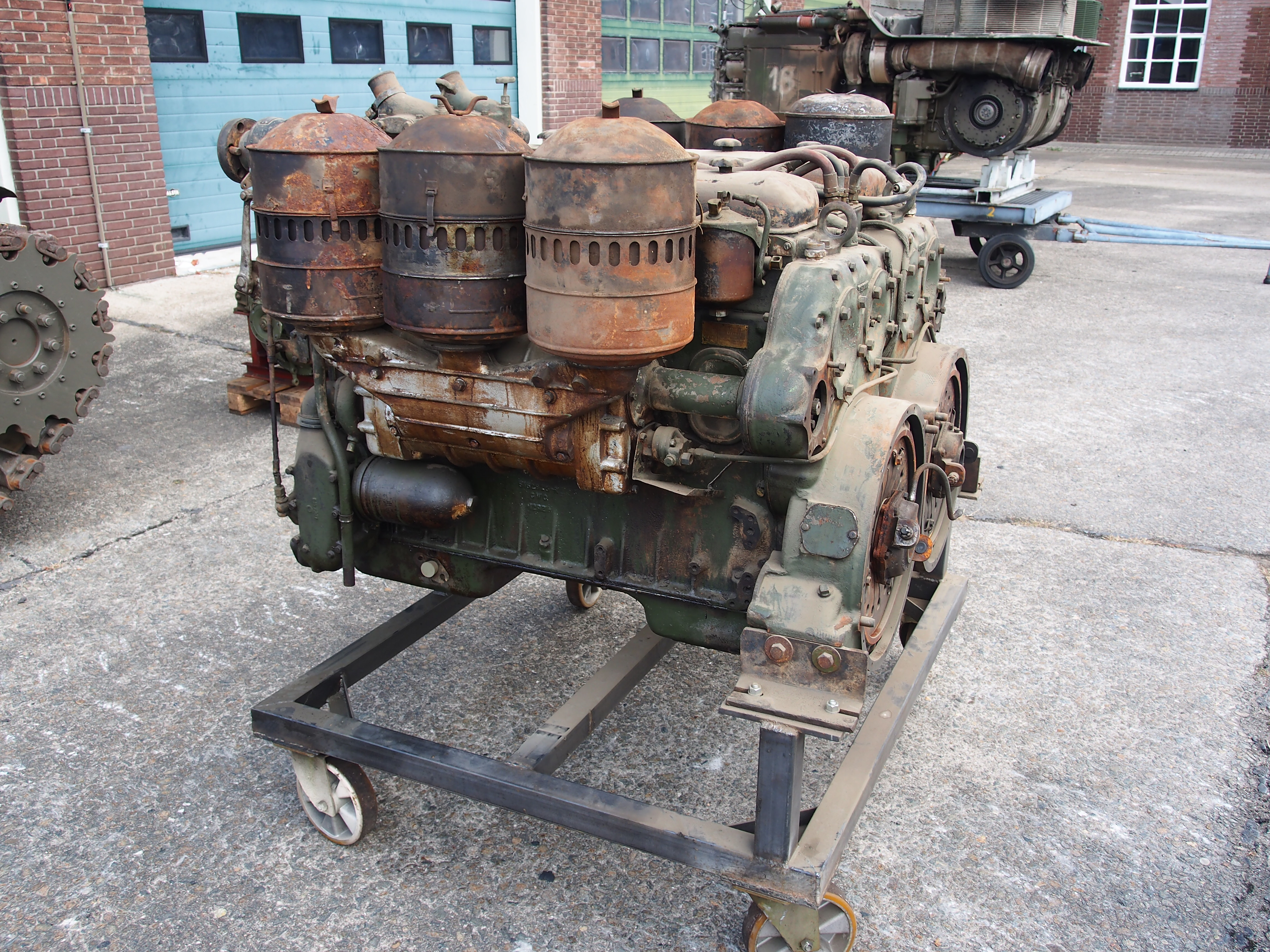
GM 6046 diesel U engine used in M4A2

The new engine was approved for production on 17 June 1943, with 200 units ordered for the gun motor carriage T70 tank destroyer. In October 1943 the British demanded that it be provided for their Shermans. Tests in February 1944 on the M4A1 tank that as well as increased power: oil consumption dropped by 35% and cylinder temperature by 50 °C.

The speed increased: the M4A1 with the new engine covered 1.5 miles (2.4 km) of paved track in 4 minutes and 45 seconds – 47 seconds faster than the tank with the R975-C1 engine. Tests have also shown increased reliability. The three new R975-C4s installed on the M4A1 were withdrawn from testing after 177, 219, and 231 hours, respectively, and the R975-C1, upgraded to the C4 standard, worked 222 hours on the M4 tank. Compared to its predecessor, the service life of the engines has increased, albeit only slightly.

In 1943, the Americans conducted large-scale trials of all types of Shermans. In total, 40 tanks were admitted to them: 10 each M4A1, M4A2, M4A3, and M4A4. The target was 400 hours or 4000 miles before the engine failed. The rest of the tank units could be repaired an unlimited number of times.

By 23 April 1943, ten M4A2 had covered a total of 16,215 miles (8229 miles on-road and 7,986 miles off-road), operating for 1,825 hours. Fuel consumption of the M4A2 was lower than that of other Shermans: 1.1 mpg (214 liters per 100 km) on the highway, and 0.5 miles per gallon (470 liters per 100 km) on off-road. On average, tanks consumed 0.81 quarts (0.76 liters) of oil per engine hour. The tests ended on 11 May. By that time, the M4A2 had covered 22,126 miles, running 2,424 hours. The average speed of the M4A2 was the fastest at 9.5 mph (15.3 km/h). The M4A1 and M4A4 both made 8 mph (13 km/h), while the M4A3 made 9.25 mph (14.89 km/h).

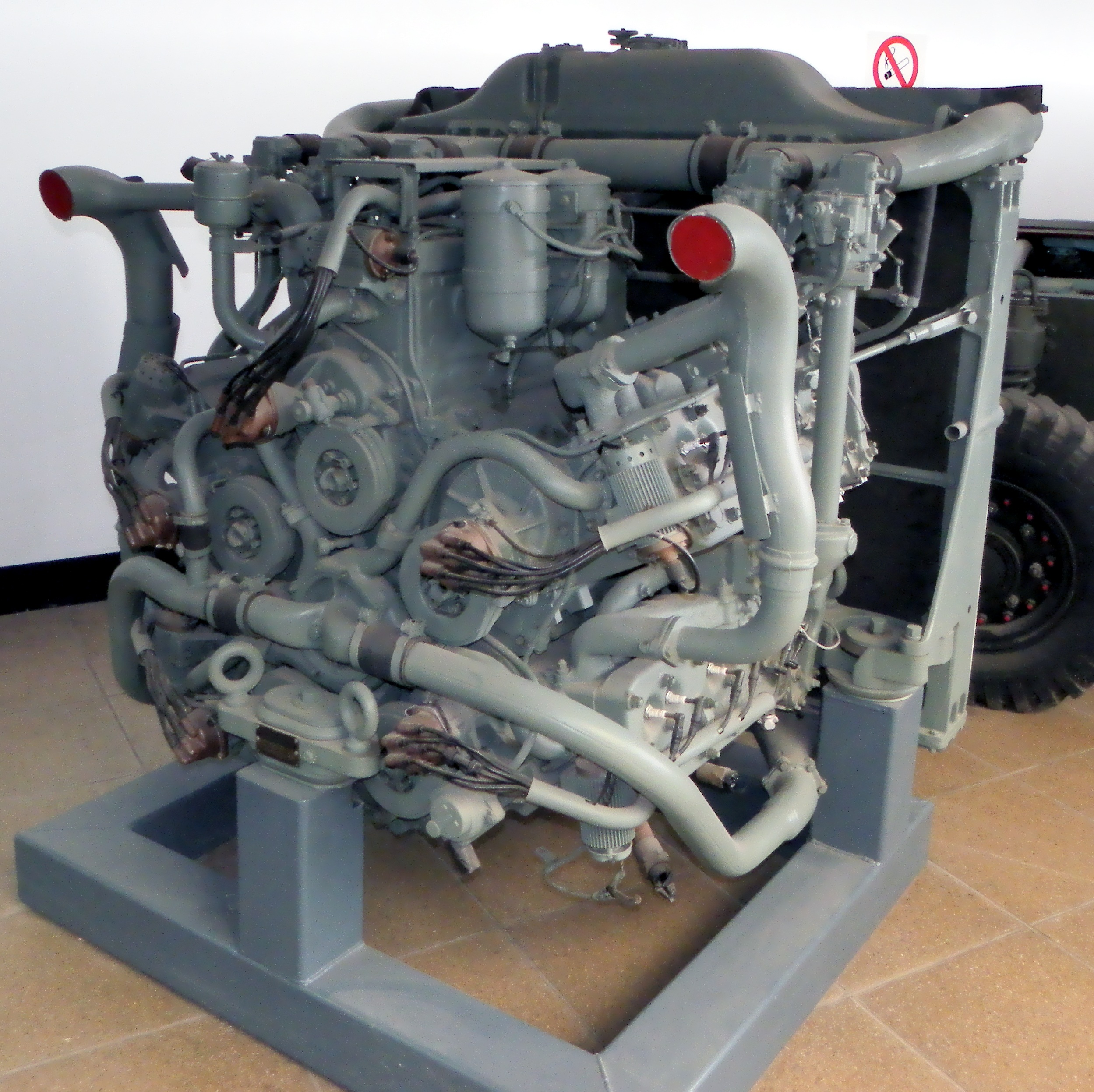
Chrysler A57 multibank engine used in M4A4

In terms of reliability, the M4A2 was in third place. The first engine failed after 75 hours of operation. Two engines worked all 400 hours, while one was in good condition, and the other was on its last legs. On average, the engines worked for 225 hours before the breakdown of the internal units. Only the R-975 engines showed themselves worse than the GM 6–71 (average service life of 218 hours). Ford GAA (255 hours) and Chrysler A57 (240 hours) proved to be more reliable. In terms of time spent on maintenance, the M4A2 came in second.

The tanks continued to race for survival. At the end of 1943, 20 vehicles entered trials at once: four M4A1, M4A2, M4A3, M4A4, and new M4E1 with an experimental engine. The Shermans drove on three types of surfaces: fine loose sand, clayey stony ground, and highways. As in previous tests, during the run, the repairmen could change any units, and only the breakdown of internal components and engine parts disqualified the tank.

By 27 December, all M4A1s (average mileage of 166 hours) and one M4A3 were out of order, but not a single tank with a diesel engine. By 18 February, tests for the M4A2 ended. Three tanks failed after 276, 278, and 353 hours, respectively, while one covered 4295 miles in 403 hours and was still on the move. From M4A3, one tank also remained on the move, but with a rather modest mileage, since it had been under repair for a long time. Of the four M4A4s, one tank broke down, and the M4E1 was removed from testing – it was decided that the RD1820 engine would not go into a large series anyway.

By 18 March, the tanks had finished testing. The M4A4 turned out to be the most reliable again: out of four tanks, three reached the finish line. The M4A4 engine also took the least time to service: 45 hours per tank. M4A2 was in second place, as the last M4A3 still broke down, and did not cover the required distance. However, the maintenance of the GM 6–71 engine took 143 hours – more than the M4A3 (110 hours) or M4A1 (132 hours). The M4A2 also did not shine in servicing the transmission group: it took 220 hours to take care of each tank (only the M4A4 with 340 hours did more). In terms of suspension service time, the tank was at the level of other "Shermans": 205 hours. A total of 327 hours of a run of the average diesel Sherman took 594.5 hours of mechanics' work.

== US variants ==
Vehicles that used the M4 chassis or hull derived from M4:

- M10 tank destroyer also known as 3-in gun motor carriage M10 – tank destroyer
- 90 mm gun motor carriage M36 also known as Jackson – tank destroyer
- 105 mm howitzer motor carriage M7B1 also known as Priest – self-propelled artillery
- 155 mm gun motor carriage M12 – self-propelled gun, paired in service with the cargo carrier M30 (also derived from the Sherman)
- 155 mm gun motor carriage M40 – 155 mm self-propelled artillery (armed with the Long Tom artillery piece). Other artillery vehicles that share the same chassis include: 8-inch (203 mm) HMC M43, 250-millimetre (9.8 in) MMC T94, and cargo carrier T30
- Flame Tank Sherman
  - M4A2 with bow mounted E4-5 flamethrower
  - POA-CWS-H1-H2 (US Army) M4A3R5 (USMC) "Mark 1" CWS in theater modifications
  - POA-CWS-H5 (US Army), M4A3R8 (USMC) with coaxial H1A-H5A flamethrower.
  - M42B1E9
- Rocket Artillery Sherman – T34 Calliope, T40 Whizbang, and other Sherman rocket launchers
- Engineer tanks – D-8, M1, and M1A1 dozers, M4 Doozit, Mobile Assault Bridge, and T1E3 Aunt Jemima mine roller and other mine-clearers
- Armored recovery vehicle – M32 tank recovery vehicle and M74 tank recovery vehicle
- Artillery tractors – M34 and M35 prime movers

== Foreign variants and use ==
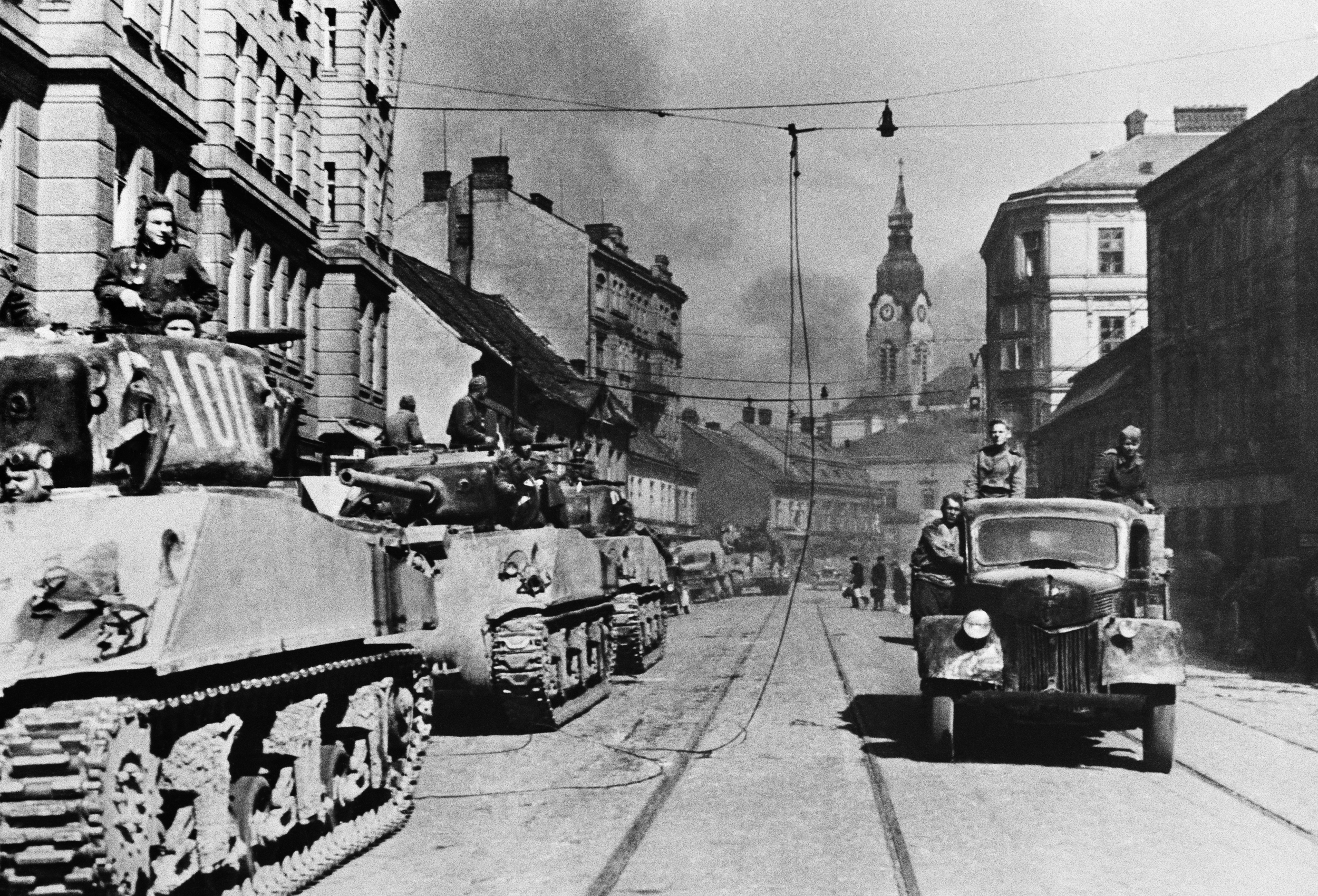
M4A2(76)W in Brno, April 1945

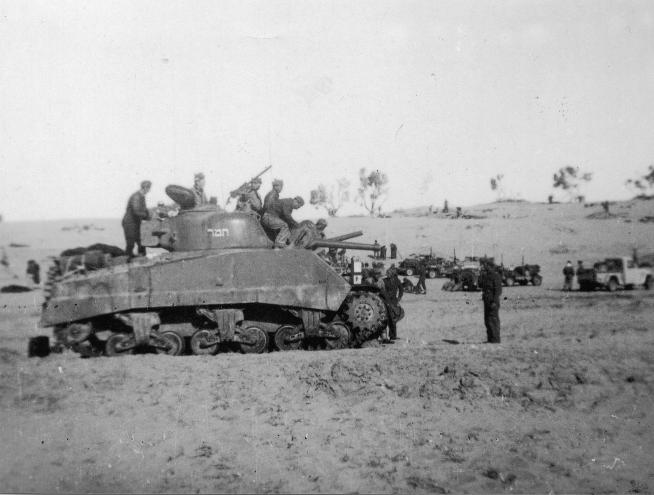
An Israeli Army Sherman tank during Operation Horev, 1948

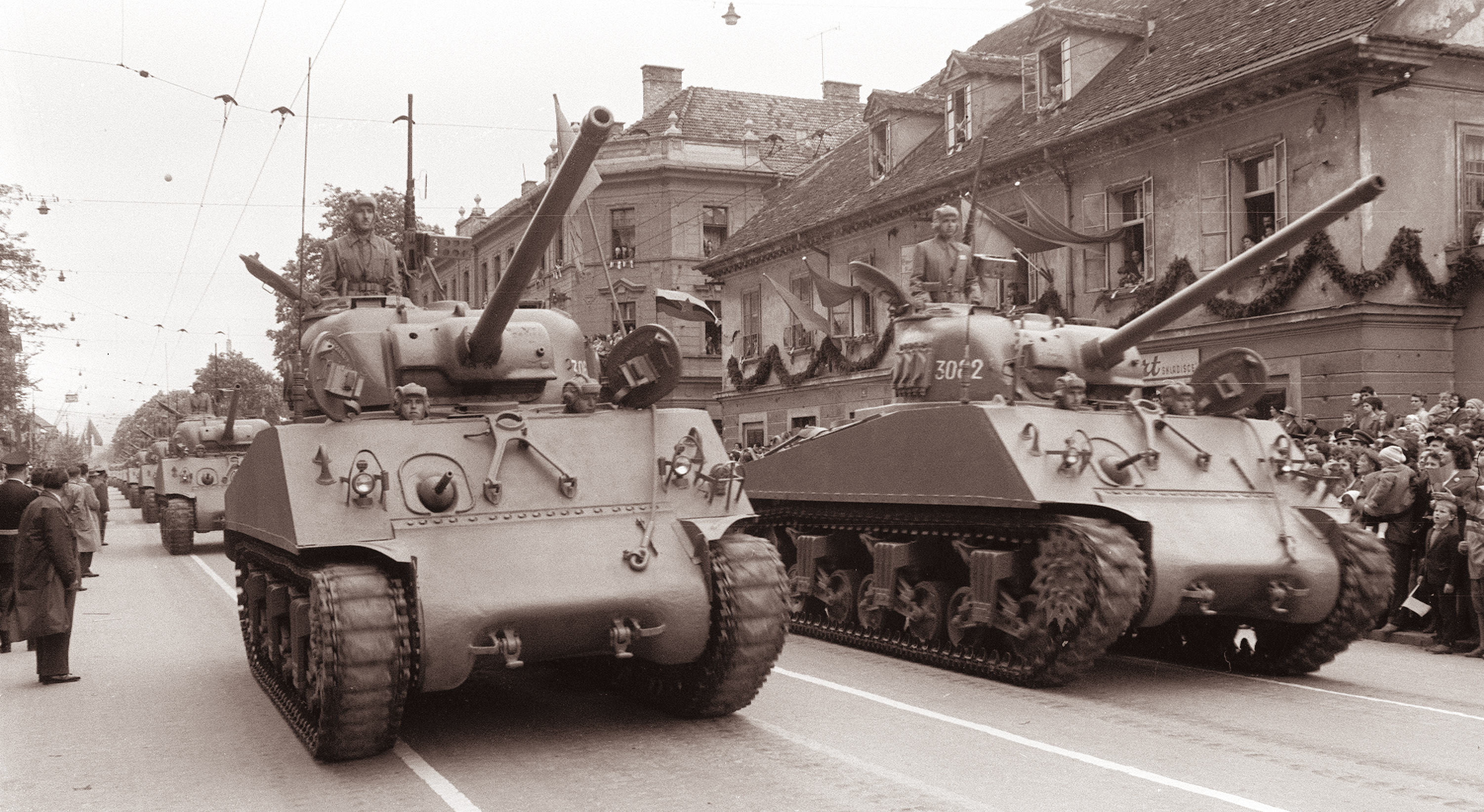
Ljubljana, May Day 1961

The Sherman was extensively supplied through Lend-Lease to Britain, the Soviet Union, China, and Free France. Britain received 17,181 in various models, mostly M4A2s and M4A4s (5,041 Sherman III and 7,167 V, respectively), of which over 2000 were re-equipped with a more powerful gun to become the Sherman Firefly. The Soviet Union was shipped 4,065 M4 (M4A2s: 1,990 with 75 mm- and 2,073 with 76 mm-armed versions, 2 M4A4s), or 4,102 M4 (2,007 with 75 mm- and 2,095 with 76 mm versions). Enrolled 3,664. The Free French were the third largest recipient, being given 755 during 1943 and 1944. At least 57 (or 157) Shermans were also delivered to other U.S. allies.

A similar vehicle was developed in Canada from January 1941, known as the Ram tank. Like the Sherman, this was based on the M3 Lee's chassis and powertrain upgraded to have a turret, although it used a new turret of Canadian design. One improvement was the use of all-steel 'CDP' (Canadian Dry Pin) tracks, which although an inch narrower than the early M4 steel and rubber pad tracks, were cheaper to produce and gave better traction. Suspension units and roadwheels remained the M3 vertical volute pattern, with the idler above the mounting bracket, rather than the M4 development with the idler moved behind the mounting bracket to give more room for suspension travel. The Ram had a distinctive turret with a bolted flat-faced mantlet and the UK 6-pounder gun, with the hull machine gunner housed in a rotating turret based on the M3 'Lee' cupola, rather than the simpler ball-mount that was becoming universal for tank hull guns. Production facilities for the Ram were constructed at the Montreal Locomotive Works, with the aid of Alco, but the large armor castings for turret and hull were supplied by General Steel Castings in the US. Greater Sherman production and availability meant that the Ram was never used in action as a gun tank, being either used for training or converted to Kangaroo armored personnel carriers.

A later Canadian medium tank, produced in late 1943, was the Grizzly, an adaption of the Sherman M4A1. This differed only in details, such as the CDP tracks, British radio equipment, and the British 2" smoke mortar in the turret roof. 188 were produced.

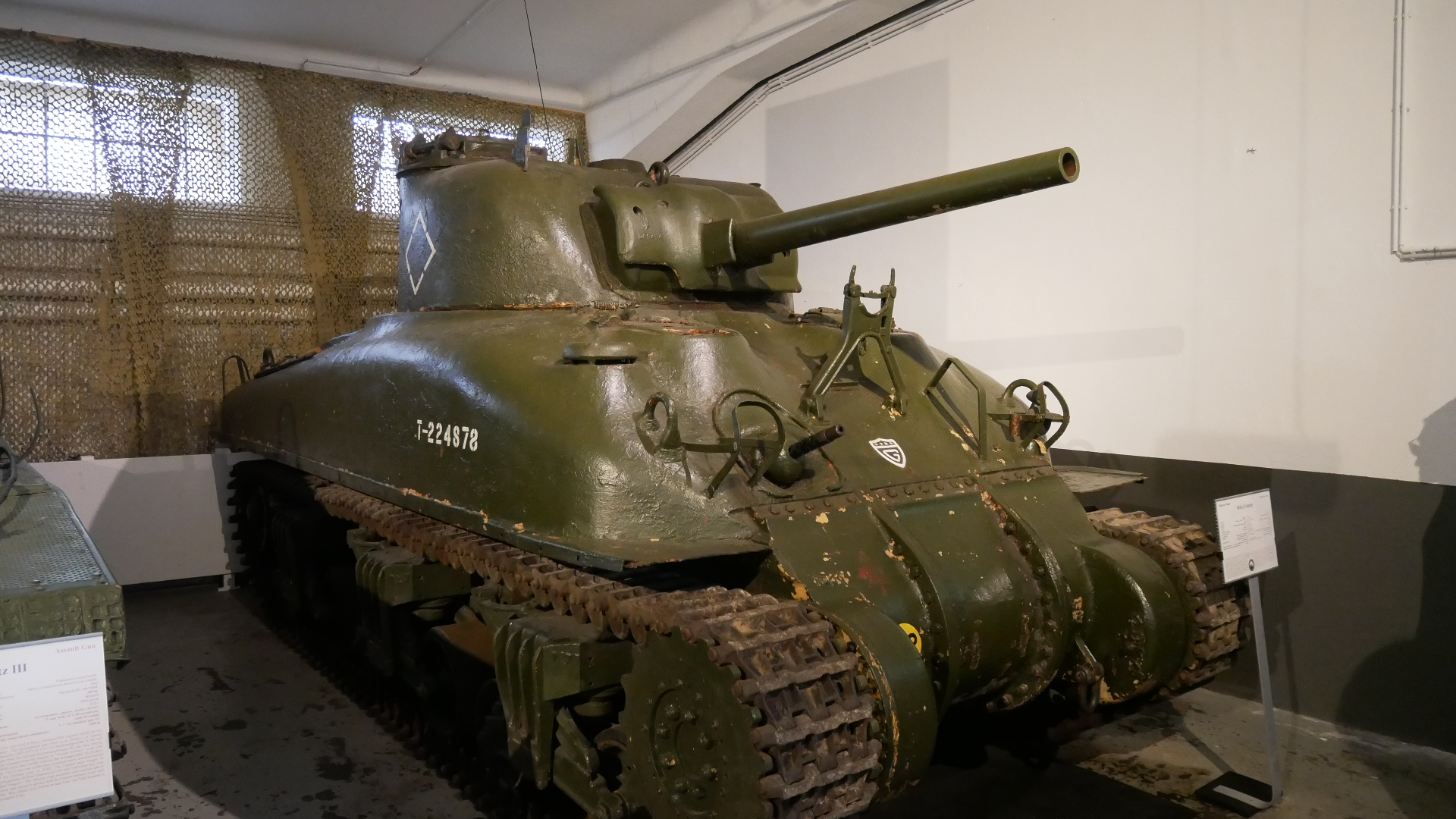
Canadian M4 Sherman "Grizzly" at the Heeresgeschichtliches Museum in Vienna, Austria.

After World War II, Shermans were supplied to some NATO armies; Shermans were used by the U.S. and allied forces in the Korean War.

After World War II, quite a few Shermans also went to Israel. The Israeli Ordnance Corps, seeking an upgrade, up-gunned it using the 75mm CN-75-50 L/61.5 from the French AMX-13/75 light tank and the 105 mm Modèle F1 from the French AMX-30 Main Battle Tank, designated the M-50 and M-51 respectively. These Super Shermans, as they were often called, were remarkable examples of how a long-obsolete design can be upgraded for front-line use. They saw combat in the 1967 Six-Day War, fighting Soviet World War II-era armor like the T-34-85, and also in the 1973 Yom Kippur War. The M-50 and M-51 Super Shermans were eventually retired from Israel in 1980, and were replaced by the much more modern Merkava platform.

Paraguay retired three Shermans from the Regimiento Escolta Presidencial (REP, "Presidential Escort Regiment") in 2018, which marked the end of service of the final Sherman tanks in use anywhere in the world.

=== Former operators ===
- Argentina
- Australia: For testing purposes only.
- Belgium: M4A3E4 Sherman was used.
- Brazil 80 M4, M4A1 Shermans received
- Canada
- Chile
- China
- Republic of China: Obtained through Lend-Lease.
- Cuba
- Denmark: M4A3E4 Sherman supplied by the US.
- Egypt: Used during the 1948 Arab–Israeli War, later received Sherman IIIs (M4A2) from Britain and some Shermans fitted with FL 10 turrets from France
- Ethiopia
- France: 755
  - Free France
- Germany: As Beutepanzer,
  captured vehicles.
- Greece
- India
- Indonesia: Inherited from the Netherlands following independence in 1949.
- Iran
- Israel
- Italy: From post-WWII.
- Japan: From post-WWII; M4A3E8 Sherman supplied by the US.
- South Korea: 20 M4A3E8 (Marine Corps, 1951), 388 M4A3E8 (Army, 1954). Retired (1971, replaced by M48 Patton).
- Lebanon
- Mexico
- Netherlands: The Royal Netherlands Army received 44 Sherman tanks in January 1952.
- New Zealand
- Nicaragua: M4A3 (105)
- Pakistan: Inherited 162 Sherman II and Sherman V at independence in 1947. 352 M4A1E6 Shermans received from the US in the 1950s.
- Paraguay: Retired in April 2018.
- Peru
- Philippines
- Poland
- Portugal: M4A3E4 Shermans used.
- South Africa
- Soviet Union: 3,664.
- Sweden: For testing purposes only.
- Syria: One turretless M4A1 Sherman.
- Uganda
- Turkey: 34 delivered in January 1945.
- United Kingdom: 17,181.
- United States: Original operator, retired in 1957.
- Yugoslavia: 599 M4A3E4 Shermans received during the Informbiro period.

== See also ==
- SCR-508
- List of land vehicles of the U.S. Armed Forces
- Allied technological cooperation during World War II
- G-numbers
- M50 Super Sherman
- Rhino tank

=== Tanks of comparable role, performance and era ===
- Argentine Nahuel DL 43
- Australian Sentinel
- Australian Thunderbolt
- British Cromwell
- British Comet – Comparable to the "Easy Eight" variant
- Canadian Grizzly I
- German Panzer III (with 7.5 cm gun)
- German Panzer IV
- German Panther – Comparable to the "Easy Eight" and "Jumbo" variants
- Hungarian Turán III
- Italian Carro Armato P 40
- Italian P43 (proposal)
- Japanese Type 3 Chi-Nu
- Romanian 1942 medium tank (proposal)
- Soviet T-34 – T-34-85 variant comparable to the "Easy Eight" variant
- Swedish Stridsvagn m/42
