= 258th Field Artillery Regiment =

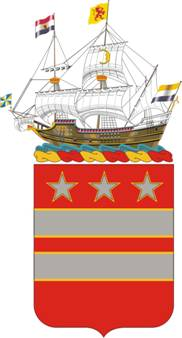
- Coat of arms
- Founded: 1809
- Country: United States
- Branch: New York Army National Guard
- Type: Field Artillery Branch
- Motto: PARATUS ET FIDELIS (Ready And Faithful)
- Equipment: M119 howitzer M777 howitzer
- Engagements: War of 1812; American Civil War; First Battle of Bull Run; Second Battle of Bull Run; Battle of Cross Keys; Battle of Antietam; Battle of Fredericksburg; Battle of Chancellorsville; Battle of Gettysburg; Battle of the Wilderness; Battle of Spotsylvania Court House; World War I; Second Battle of the Somme; Battle of Lys; Meuse-Argonne; Battle of Flanders; Fifth Battle of Ypres; World War II; Bismark Archipelago Campaign; Marshall Islands Campaign; Battle of Leyte; Battle of Luzon; Mariana Islands Campaign; Southern Philippines Campaign; Ryukyus Campaign; Tunisia Campaign; Naples Foggia Campaign; Rome-Arno Campaign; Normandy Campaign; Northern France Campaign; Rhineland Campaign; Ardennes-Alsace Campaign; Central Europe Campaign; Korean War; First UN Counteroffensive; CCF Spring Offensive; UN Summer-Fall Offensive; Second Korean Winter Campaign; Korea, Summer-Fall 1952 Campaign; Third Korean Winter Campaign; Korea, Summer 1953 Campaign; Global War on Terrorism
- Decorations: Belgium Fourragere Shoulder Cord; Presidential Unit Citation; Meritorious Unit Citation with oak leaf.

Insignia
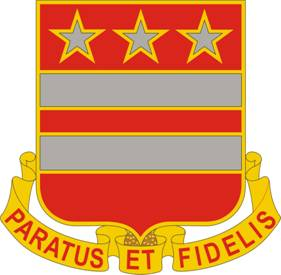
- Distinctive unit insignia

The 258th Field Artillery Regiment or "Washington Greys" is a field artillery unit of the New York Army National Guard that traces its lineage from 1789 to present. Circa 1957–1966 it consisted of four battalions.

== History ==
Predecessors of the 258th Field Artillery Regiment fought in the War of 1812, the Spanish–American War, the American Civil War, World War I, World War II, Korean War, and the global war on terrorism. The 258th Field Artillery is one of only nineteen Army National Guard units with campaign credit for the War of 1812.

=== Early history ===
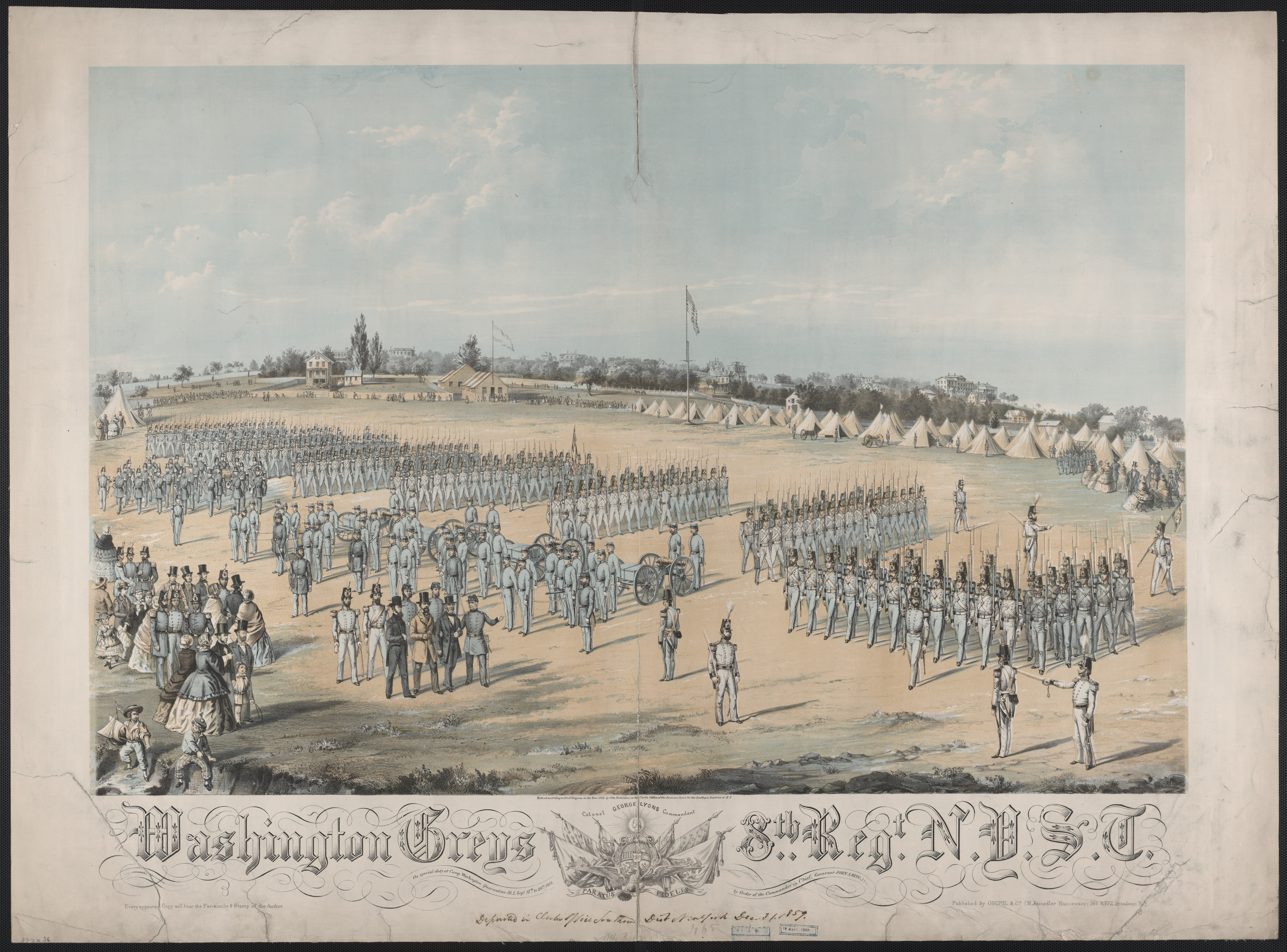
The Washington Greys in 1858

The 258th Field Artillery Regiment can trace its origins to the formation of an artillery battery in 1784 under the command of Capt. Jacob Sebring. On April 30, 1789, Capt. Sebring's battery formed part of the escort for General George Washington's inauguration in New York City. Since that time the battery and its descendants have proudly claimed the title "Washington Grays" due to the gray coats of their uniform during that time.

The regiment was formed on October 9, 1809, as the 4th Regiment, New York State Artillery, organized from existing batteries. It was redesignated on June 13, 1812, as the 3rd Regiment, New York State Artillery. The unit was brought into federal service for the War of 1812 in 1812, and again in 1814.

The regiment served with distinction during the War of 1812 at Fort Gansevoort and Fort Green defending the harbor of New York. In 1847, it was redesignated as the 8th New York Regiment, New York State Militia (NYSM). and throughout the first half of the 19th century was called for service in many civil disturbances including the Flour Riot, Abolition Riot, Stone Cutter's Riot (1835), Stevedore Riot (1836), Croton Water Riot, Great Fire (1845), Astor Place Riot (1849), Police Riot (1857), Dead Rabbit Riot (1857), Sepoy Riot 1858), and Quarantine Riot (1858).

=== American Civil War ===
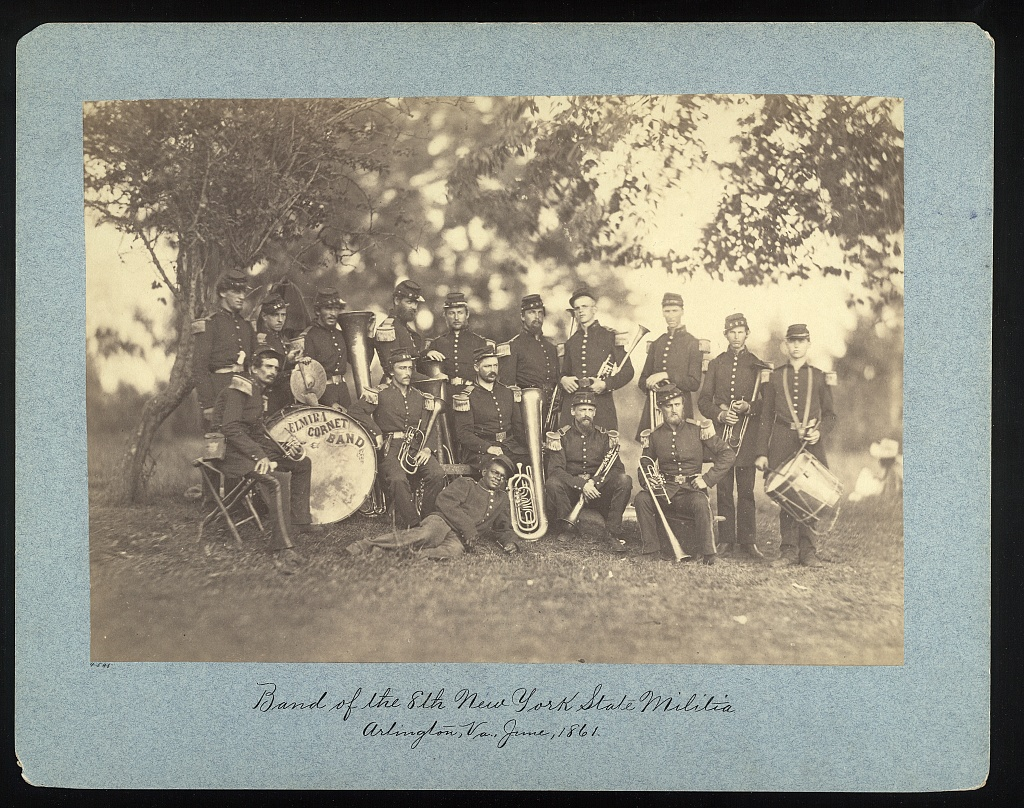
"Elmira Cornet Band," of the "8th New York State Milita", Arlington, Va. June 1861

The unit served three periods of federal service in the American Civil War. As the 8th NYSM, the unit was organized in April, 1861 for 90 days' service, leaving New York state for Washington, D.C., on the 20th and mustering in to federal service on the 26th. It served in the defenses of Washington, DC until July. The unit was part of Porter's 1st Brigade, Hunter's 2nd Division, McDowell's Army of Northeast Virginia at the First Battle of Bull Run on July 21, 1861. The 8th returned to New York City, mustering out there on August 2, 1861. Following redesignation as the 8th Regiment, New York National Guard, the unit was mustered in again on May 29, 1862, for 90 days' service. It served in the defenses of Washington, D.C., as part of the garrison of that city, and was mustered out of service on September 9, 1862. It was called up for a third time in June, 1863, for 30 days' service in response to Robert E. Lee's invasion of Pennsylvania in June of that year. It served in Harrisburg, Pennsylvania, as part of the garrison of that city and 1st Brigade, 1st Division, Dept. of the Susquehanna, and was mustered out of service on July 23, 1863.

The 8th also had an artillery battery known as "Varian's 1st Troop Washington Grays". This battery mustered into federal service on April 19, 1861, and left New York for Annapolis, Maryland. On May 18 moved near a lighthouse at Smith's Point on Chesapeake Bay. Outpost duty in Northern Virginia through June 17. Attached to Keyes' Brigade, Tyler's Division, McDowell's Army of Northeast Virginia, to July. Mustered out July 20, 1861, the day before the First Battle of Bull Run. The unit's guns served in the battle with Blenkers' Brigade, Miles' Division as "Brookwood's New York Battery" under Captain Charles Brookwood, manned by detachments from the 8th Militia and 29th New York Volunteer Infantry. The battery was federalized again with the remainder of the regiment in June–July, 1863 as above.

The 4th Independent Battery Light Artillery was recruited and organized in New York City as Company L, Artillery Company, Serrell's Engineers, and part of the 1st Troop, Washington Greys. It was mustered in the United States service for three years at Staten Island on October 24, 1861, and left the State the next day commanded by. Capt. James E. Smith. Later in October it received its arms, Parrott guns, and was designated Battery C, and a few weeks later, Battery D, N. Y. Light Artillery. December 7, 1861, it received its numerical designation from the State. It took part in the following engagements: Siege of Yorktown, Williamsburg, Fair Oaks, Seven Days, Fredericksburg, Chancellorsville, Gettysburg, Auburn, Bristoe Station and the Mine Run campaign. It was discontinued on Dec. 4, 1863, commanded by 1st Lieut. William T. McLean and its members were transferred to the 1st N. Y. engineers, the 5th and 15th N. Y. batteries, and Battery B, ist N. Y. artillery. The 4th lost during service 5 men killed and mortally wounded, and 1 officer and 11 men died of disease and other causes. The Battery distinguished itself at Battle of Gettysburg, where it materially aided in seizing and retaining Little Round Top from John Bell Hood Division. At the time of the assault by Hood’s Division of the Confederate Army, this battery, supported by the 4th Maine Infantry Regiment, formed the extreme left of the Third Corps line. Three guns of the two sections in action on this crest were captured by the Confederates. The third section was in position to the right and continued the action until nearly 6 p.m., its loss during this battle being 2 killed, 10 wounded, and 1 missing.

In August 1861, the detachments of the 8th NYSM and 29th NY Vols. that had served the 1st Troop's guns were reorganized as the 2nd New York Independent Battery, Light Artillery (Blenker's Battery). The unit served in Washington, D.C., until April 1862, operating in the Shenandoah Valley to August 1862, fighting in the Battle of Cross Keys and Second Battle of Bull Run. In early May 1863, the unit was in the Battle of Chancellorsville. After transferring three-year men to Battery I, 1st New York Light Artillery, the unit mustered out on June 13, 1863.

On May 13, 1847, a detachment was constituted in the New York State Militia as the 14th Regiment. It was Mustered into Federal service May 23, 1861 in Washington, D.C. and Redesignated 7 December 1861 as the 84th New York Volunteer Infantry Regiment. During its service the regiment lost by death, killed in action, 5 officers, 83 enlisted men; of wounds received in action, 3 officers, 61 enlisted men; of disease and other causes, 74 enlisted men; total, 8 officers, 218 enlisted men; aggregate, 226; of whom 17 enlisted men died in the hands of the enemy. It was Mustered out of Federal service June 6, 1864 in New York City. It was Reorganized in the New York National Guard as the 14th Infantry Regiment. Mustered into Federal service 13–16 May 1898 at Hempstead as the 14th New York Volunteer Infantry; mustered out of Federal service 27 October 1898 in Brooklyn, NY.

In the second half of the 19th century, the 8th Regiment was called out for several strikes and riots such as the Orange Riot (1871), the Great Railroad Strike (1877), the Brooklyn Trolley Strike (1895) and New York City Draft Riots (1863).

=== Spanish–American War through 1913 ===
The 8th briefly returned to federal service in 1898 during the Spanish–American War as the 8th New York Volunteer Infantry Regiment, mustering in by May 19 and mustering out on November 3. It did not deploy outside the United States. In 1906 the 8th Infantry Regiment was reorganized and redesignated as the 8th Infantry Battalion. It was reorganized and redesignated 21 January 1908 as the 8th Infantry Regiment. It was then converted and redesignated 23 January 1908 as the 8th Artillery District, Coast Artillery Corps.

=== World War I ===
The 8th Artillery District was reorganized and redesignated 10 August 1914 as the 8th Coast Defense Command, Coast Artillery Corps, New York National Guard. In 1917 the unit relocated from Manhattan to the new Kingsbridge Armory in the Bronx. Mustered into Federal service 22 July 1917 at New York; drafted into Federal service 5 August 1917. Companies of the 8th Coast Defense Command were reorganized and redesignated 22 January–1 February 1918 as elements of the 58th Artillery (Coast Artillery Corps), the Coast Defenses of Southern New York, and the Coast Defenses of Eastern New York. Men were drawn from the Headquarters and Supply Companies of the 58th Artillery's Coast Defenses of Eastern New York and the Third Battalion of the Coast Defenses of Baltimore. On April 6, 1918, Battery F formed the guard of honor for President Wilson in Baltimore, and he commended it for its performance.

The regiment trained for war in Fort Totten and Fort Schuyler, New York. Throughout May its battalions departed from Hoboke for France. Its total number assembled in Brest reached 66 officers and 1,811 men by May 31. They then departed for training alongside the French army at Ambazac. On June 2, the 58th Artillery was assigned to the 32nd Artillery Brigade, and equipped with breech-loaded Vickers Mk 6. 8-inch howitzers. They were mounted on two types of “caterpillars,” engines of agricultural origin that generated up to 75 or 120 horsepower.

On October 20, the regiment departed for the front and its three battalions were divided. The First and Second Battalions established camp at Montjoie near Manonville during the St. Mihiel Offensive. Meanwhile, the Third Battalion moved to the Adrian barracks near Jezainville.

After establishing camps, the battalions began scouting ideal locations to set up their batteries, and then the work of camouflaging, setting up telephone wires, and digging in. The First Battalion set up its guns in the valley of Foret des Vencheres, firing its first shot on October 31, and its last of the war only four minutes before the signing of the armistice on November 11. On the night of November 8, the battalion’s batteries were scouted and strafed by German airplanes. The sortee was followed by severe and accurate shelling with explosives and gas. One shell scored a direct hit on Battery A’s powder dump. The shelling killed one man, the regiment’s only man to die in action during the war. The Second Battalion was also assigned to Foret des Vencheres. Its targets on the German side of no-man’s-land were Onville, Waville, Vandelainville, and Pagny-sur-Moselle. A few days prior to the armistice, the Second Battalion advanced to Sainte Marie Farm just northeast of Vilcey. For the caliber of the unit’s guns, the position was very close to the German lines and the troops who set up the position suffered twenty casualties, wounded, from shelling and gas. The battalion was intended to assist an advance on the Metz front that never took place because the armistice was signed on November 11.

The Third Battalion was assigned to positions at Meurthe-et-Moselle and directed its fire on German positions near Vittonville. New York elements of the 58th Artillery (Coast Artillery Corps) demobilized 7 May 1919 at Camp Upton, New York; elements of the Coast Defenses of Southern New York in December 1918 at Fort Wadsworth, New York; and elements of the Coast Defenses of Eastern New York in December 1918 at Fort Totten, New York.

=== Interwar period ===
The former 8th Coast Defense Command was consolidated with the 8th Coast Defense Command, New York Guard, and reorganized in the New York National Guard as the 193rd Field Artillery with headquarters federally recognized 11 May 1921 at Bronx. It was redesignated as the 258th Field Artillery (155 mm gun) on 28 November 1921 and assigned to II Corps.

=== World War II ===
On 3 February 1941 the regiment was inducted into federal service and moved to Fort Ethan Allen, Vermont; assigned to 71st Field Artillery Brigade, VI Corps. Moved to Madison Barracks, NY on 2 June 1941; moved to Pine Camp, NY on 18 May 1942. On 8 February 1943 the regiment was broken up (triangularized) in accordance with an Army-wide reorganization. It became the 258th Field Artillery Group (former Headquarters & Headquarters Battery), 258th Field Artillery Battalion (former 1st Battalion) and the 991st Field Artillery Battalion (former 2nd Battalion). All were deployed to Europe.

The 258th Field Artillery Group departed the New York port of embarkation on 22 January 1944, arrived in England on 28 January 1944 and moved to Normandy, France on 8 July 1944. Moved into Holland on 16 September 1944 and Germany 19 November 1944. The unit was at Alsfeld, Germany in August 1945. Campaign credit includes the Normandy, Northern France, Rhineland, and Central Europe campaigns. Returned to Boston Port of Embarkation 24 September 1945 and inactivated the next day.

The 258th Field Artillery Battalion was a self-propelled unit equipped with twelve 155 mm M12 gun motor carriages. It departed the New York port of embarkation on 22 January 1944, arrived in England on 28 January 1944 and moved to France on 2 July 1944. Campaign credit includes the Normandy, Northern France, Rhineland, and Central Europe campaigns. In August 1945 the unit was at Lehrbach, Germany. Returned to Boston port of embarkation 18 December 1945 and inactivated the next day.

The 991st Field Artillery Battalion departed the New York port of embarkation on 22 January 1944, arrived in England on 28 January 1944 and moved to France on 11 July 1944. It was attached to the 3rd Armored Division or VII Corps for most of the war, as a self-propelled unit equipped with twelve 155 mm M12 gun motor carriages. Batteries were detached to support divisions in combat as necessary. The 991st FA landed on Omaha Beach, Normandy on July 11, 1944 where it was bombed and strafed by German airplanes within hours of landing. Battery B of the 991st was credited with firing the first shells into German soil and Battery C was given credit for its role in the capture of Aachen. The 991st was also the first American unit to use captured 155 mm enemy shells. The Germans were using captured French Canon de 155 mm GPF guns (German designation 15.5 cm K 418(f)), similar to the GPF-derived 155 mm gun M1918 on the M12 gun motor carriage the 991st was armed with. The 991st also deployed a single pilot M40 gun motor carriage with the 155 mm "Long Tom" gun. Campaign credit includes the Normandy, Northern France, Ardennes-Alsace (Battle of the Bulge), Rhineland, and Central Europe campaigns. The unit was in Allstedt, Germany in August 1945. Returned to Boston Port of Embarkation 15 November 1945 and inactivated the next day.

=== After World War II ===
Headquarters and Headquarters Battery, 1st Battalion, 258th Field Artillery, in formation, 9 September 2006

In 1957 the battalion of the 258th FA at Kingsbridge Armory had all four batteries equipped with 105 mm towed artillery pieces. In 1959 all the units were switched to 155 mm towed. At some time prior to 1962, the unit again changed to 8-inch howitzer towed. Additionally, in 1962 one battery was upgraded to the Honest John Rocket.

1st Battalion (155mm towed), 2nd Bn (105mm towed), 3rd Bn (105mm towed), and the 4th Rocket/Howitzer Battalion armed with 8" Howitzer and Honest John Rocket were all located in the Kingsbridge Armory, Bronx, NY. They were part of the 42nd Infantry Division Artillery (DIVARTY). The 3rd Battalion was deactivated first; then in 1967 the 2nd Battalion, followed in 1973 by the 4th Battalion.

In 2001, During the September 11 attacks, members of the 258 FA were among the first to arrive at the scene of the terrorist attacks on the World Trade Center and for the next several weeks actively assisted in the security and relief efforts at the site.

In 2004, B Battery (temporarily redesignated Company G 89th Military Police Brigade) commanded by CPT Seth Morgulas (now Colonel and commander of the 369th Sustainment Brigade) and C Battery commanded by CPT Andrew Espinoza deployed to Iraq in support of Operation Iraqi Freedom II/III. B Battery was awarded the Meritorious Unit Citation for its service.

In 2008, the 1st Battalion, 258th Field Artillery was composed of three batteries and a support company. Battery A was located in New Windsor, New York. Battery B in Bronx, New York. Headquarters and Headquarters Battery was in Jamaica, New York and Company G, 427th BSB in Jamaica, NY. The battalion was equipped with the M119 105 mm towed howitzer. It was planned that the battalion would re-equip with the M777 155 mm towed howitzer in 2019, at Fort Sill, OK.

Since 2001 the battalion has sent soldiers to both Operation Enduring Freedom and Operation Iraqi Freedom. It is part of the 27th Infantry Brigade Combat Team, part of the 42nd Infantry Division.

=== Campaign participation credit ===
- War of 1812: Streamer without inscription
- American Civil War: First Battle of Bull Run, Second Battle of Bull Run, Battle of Antietam, Battle of Fredericksburg, Battle of Chancellorsville, Battle of Gettysburg, Battle of the Wilderness, Battle of Spotsylvania Court House, Virginia 1861, Virginia 1862, Virginia 1863
- World War I: Second Battle of the Somme, Ypres-Lys, Meuse-Argonne, Flanders 1918, Lorraine 1918
- World War II: Central Pacific, Bismarck Archipelago, Eastern Mandates, Battle of Leyte, Battle of Luzon, Western Pacific, Southern Philippines (with arrowhead), Ryukyus, Tunisia Campaign, Naples-Foggia, Rome-Arno, Normandy (with arrowhead), Northern France, Rhineland, Ardennes-Alsace, Central Europe
- Korean War : First UN Counter Offensive, CCF Spring Offensive, UN Summer-Fall Offensive, Second Korean Winter, Korea, Summer-Fall 1952, Third Korean Winter, Korea, Summer 1953
- War on terrorism: Operation Enduring Freedom, Operation Iraqi Freedom

Headquarters Battery (Jamaica), 1st Battalion, additionally entitled to:

- World War I: Champagne-Marne, Aisne-Marne, St. Mihiel, Champagne 1918
- World War II: North Apennines, Po Valley

== Unit decorations ==
- Navy Unit Commendation, Streamer embroidered ENIWETOK ATOLL
- Philippine Presidential Unit Citation, Streamer embroidered 17 OCTOBER 1944 TO 4 JULY 1945

Headquarters Battery (Jamaica) and Battery B (Bronx), 1st Battalion, each additionally entitled to:

- Republic of Korea Presidential Unit Citation, Streamer embroidered KOREA 1951-1952

Battery B (Bronx), 1st Battalion, additionally entitled to:

- Meritorious Unit Commendation (Army), Streamer embroidered IRAQ 2004-2005
- Belgian Fourragere 1940:

Cited in the Order of the Day of the Belgian Army for action in Belgium Cited in the Order of the Day of the Belgian Army for action in the Ardennes

== Distinctive unit insignia ==
- Description

A Gold color metal and enamel device 1 3/16 inches (3.02 cm) in height overall consisting of a shield blazoned: Gules, two bars Gray fimbriated Or in chief three mullets of the second (Gray) fimbriated of the third (Or). Attached below the shield a Gold scroll inscribed “PARATUS ET FIDELIS” in Red letters.

- Symbolism

The shield is the shield of George Washington modified by reversing the colors and using gray piped with gold, instead of silver, and giving a red shield for Artillery. The arms of the Father of our Country are not to be borne by any organization and the shield of the regiment is accordingly modified. The reason for this selection is that it is a tradition that one company of this regiment paraded as an escort to General Washington on the occasion of his inauguration as President on 30 April 1789, and in commemoration of that event, assumed the name of “Washington Greys” which it has borne to this date. It was then an Artillery organization and wore a gray uniform.

- Background

The distinctive unit insignia was originally approved for the 258th Field Artillery Regiment on 19 January 1925. It was redesignated for the 258th Field Artillery Battalion on 12 March 1954. It was redesignated for the 258th Artillery Regiment on 22 March 1962. The insignia was amended to add a motto on 18 October 1968. It was redesignated for the 258th Field Artillery Regiment on 31 July 1972.

== Coat of arms ==
- Blazon
  - Shield: Gules, two bars Gray fimbriated Or in chief three mullets of the second (Gray) fimbriated of the third (Or).
  - Crest: That for the regiments and separate battalions of the New York Army National Guard: On a wreath of the colors Or and Gules, the full-rigged ship “Half Moon” all Proper.
  - Motto PARATUS ET FIDELIS (Ready And Faithful).
- Symbolism
  - Shield: The shield is the shield of George Washington modified by reversing the colors and using gray piped with gold, instead of silver, and giving a red shield for Artillery. The arms of the Father of our Country are not to be borne by any organization and the shield of the regiment is accordingly modified. The reason for this selection is that it is a tradition that one company of this regiment paraded as an escort to General Washington on the occasion of his inauguration as President on 30 April 1789, and in commemoration of that event, assumed the name of “Washington Greys” which it has borne to this date. It was then an Artillery organization and wore a gray uniform.
  - Crest: The crest is that of the New York Army National Guard.
- Background: The coat of arms was originally approved for the 258th Field Artillery Regiment on 19 January 1925. It was redesignated for the 258th Field Artillery Battalion on 12 March 1954. It was redesignated for the 258th Artillery Regiment on 22 March 1962. The insignia was redesignated for the 258th Field Artillery Regiment on 31 July 1972.

== See also ==
- 1st Battalion, 258th Field Artillery (United States)
- 8th New York Volunteer Infantry Regiment - different Civil War unit with same number

== Bibliography ==
- 258th Field Artillery Regiment at The Institute of Heraldry
- Stanton, Shelby L. (1991). World War II Order of Battle. Galahad Books. ISBN 0-88365-775-9.
