= M41 howitzer motor carriage =

M41 "Gorilla" howitzer motor carriage
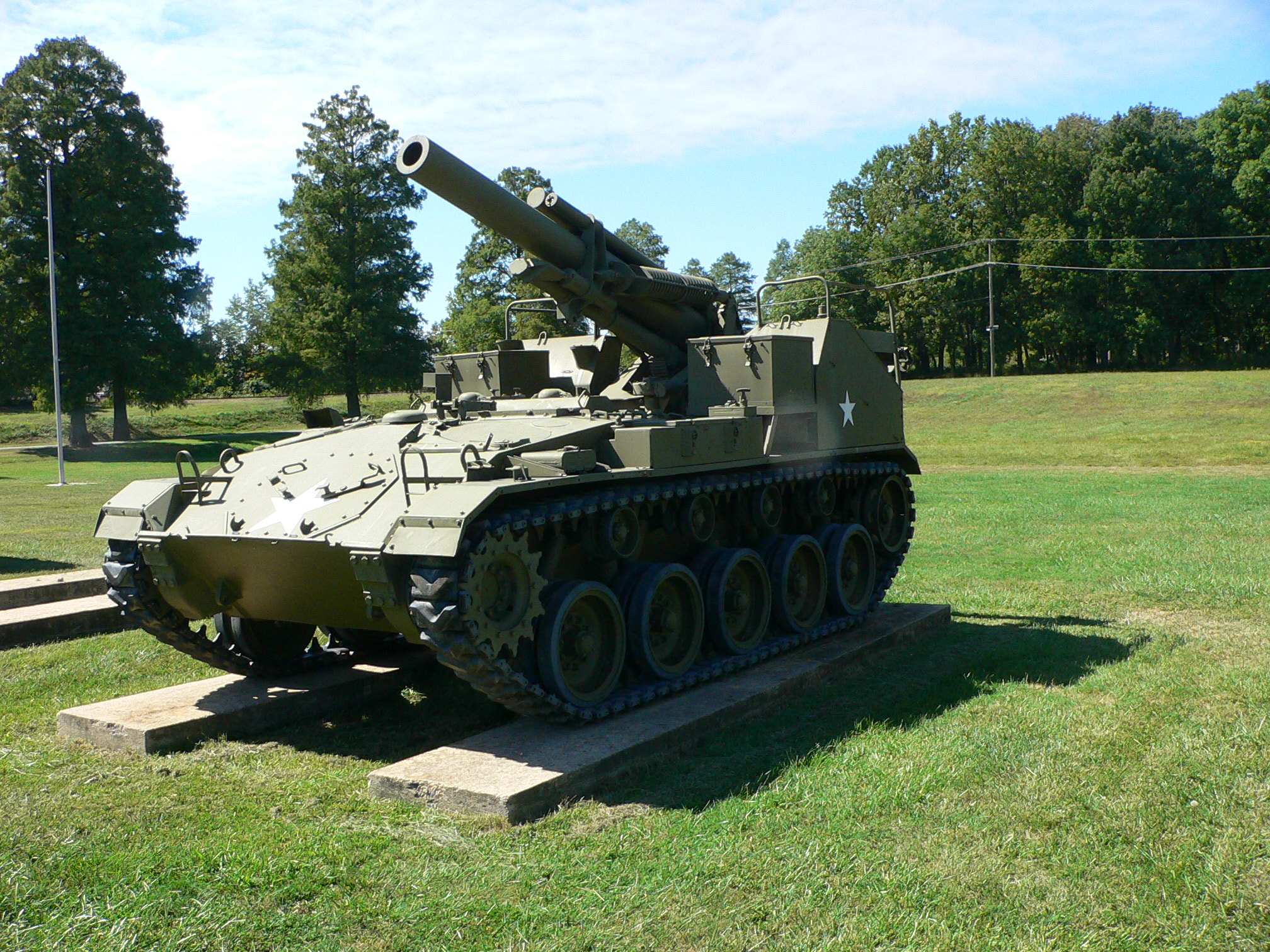
- M41 in the US Army Ordnance Museum
- Type: Self-propelled artillery
- Place of origin: United States

Specifications
- Mass: 42,500 lb (19.3 t)
- Length: 230 in (5.8 m)
- Width: 112 in (2.8 m)
- Height: 94 in (2.4 m)
- Crew: 5
- Shell: separate loading, bagged charge
- Caliber: 155 mm (6.1 in)
- Elevation: 45 to -5 degrees
- Traverse: 17.5 degrees right, 20 left
- Rate of fire: Sustained: 4 rpm
- Muzzle velocity: 1,847 ft/s (563 m/s)
- Effective firing range: Conventional:
- Maximum firing range: 14,600 m
- Feed system: hand, 22 rounds
- Armor: 13 mm
- Main armament: 155 mm Howitzer M1
- Engine: two Cadillac 4T24 V8; 2x 110 hp (82 kW)
- Power/weight: 10.8 hp per ton
- Suspension: Torsion bar, ground pressure: 10.7 psi (74 kPa)
- Operational range: 100 or 150 mi (160 or 240 km)
- Maximum speed: 35 mph (56 km/h)

The 155 mm howitzer motor carriage M41 (also known as the M41 Gorilla) was an American self-propelled artillery vehicle built on a lengthened M24 Chaffee tank chassis that was introduced at the end of the Second World War. Out of a planned run of 250, only 85 were produced before cancellation of the order at the end of 1945. The M41 went on to serve extensively in the Korean War, its success influencing the design of later U.S. self-propelled artillery. The type was retired after the conclusion of that conflict but went on to serve in the French Army from 1956 to 1972.

== History ==
In December 1942, work began on a 155 mm self-propelled howitzer based on the newly introduced M1 155 mm howitzer and the chassis of an M5 Stuart light tank. This resulted in the production of a single prototype designated the T64. However, the approval of the superior M24 Chaffee light tank whose chassis was expected to be a standard used for other vehicles, such as self-propelled guns, and specialist vehicles (collectively known as the "Light Combat Team") led to the scrapping of the T64 in favor of a new design - designated the T64E1 - using the Chaffee chassis.

Equipped with a M1 155 mm howitzer with a heavy recoil-absorption spade at the back, the T64E1 was intended to the supplement the earlier M12 Gun Motor Carriage. It had two 110 hp (82 kW) Cadillac V8 engines centrally mounted and a crew of five, including a driver in the hull and gunners mounted in an open-top compartment in the back in an arrangement similar to the 155mm M12 Gun Motor Carriage already in service in the war. The howitzer had limited side-to-side traverse and up to 45 degrees vertical traverse, and a total of 22 rounds could be stored in the vehicle. Additional ammunition was carried by M39 armored utility vehicles. The hull had only 13 mm of armor all around, sufficient to protect only against small arms, while the shielding around the gun compartment was only 6.5 mm thick.

After the T64E1 underwent trials at Aberdeen Proving Ground in December 1944, minor modifications were made and production began by the Massey Harris agricultural equipment company in May 1945. The type was re-designated the M41 in June 1945. However, the M41 arrived too late to see action in World War II, and the initial order of 250 was reduced to 85. These M41s served in the peacetime army, where they received the appellation "Gorilla", and went on to serve in the Korean War before being retired. Some M41s were also passed on to the French Army, but they were soon replaced by other designs.

=== Composition of the crew of an M41 in service order ===
The M41 has a crew of 10 people in total to serve the piece.

- The piece leader has, for the French army, a AN/GRC-9 or TRPP 8 radio.
- The pointer.
- The first artificer, screws and adjusts the fuses on the shells.
- Second artificer helping the first artificer.
- The driver whose main mission is to drive the tank to its destination.
- The car chief responsible for the equipment.
- The gunner whose mission is to insert the primer and activate the firing cord.
- The loader who prepares the charges according to the orders received from the piece leader.
- The assistant loader who helps load the shell onto the stretcher to insert it into the tube and also implements the double stakes.
- The supplier who supplies the shells which are stored in a so-called security zone.

Additional tasks are assigned to certain gunners

== Operational service ==
M41s were used in action in the Korean War, where they were useful in providing support during the early mobile phase of the conflict. Once the war ground down to static engagements, the M41s employed their mobility to evade counter-battery fire. The 92nd Field Artillery Battalion and the 999th Armored Field Artillery Battalion were among units that employed M41s in Korea.

=== Ambush in the Battle of Imjin River ===
Another unit equipped with the M41 in Korea, the African-American 999th Armored Field Artillery Battalion, fought at the Battle of the Imjin River, where it provided artillery support for the 1st Republic of Korea Infantry Division. During the battle, Battery B was forced to evacuate its position after neighboring units withdrew. During the evacuation, it was ambushed by Chinese forces and consequently suffered seven crew killed and 31 wounded, with a loss of 2 M39s, and 2 M41s damaged. However, the unit soon routed the ambush, inflicting an estimated 100 casualties on the ambushing forces, and promptly resumed providing artillery support.

=== Captured Chinese M41s ===
The Chinese People's Liberation Army captured two M41s during the Korean War, employing them against U.S. forces in the Battle of Maryang San. One of them can be seen on display at the Military Museum of the Chinese People's Revolution in Beijing.

=== Performance and legacy ===
Compared to the contemporary 155 mm M40 gun motor carriage, the M41 was lighter and faster, but had inferior range. Like other contemporary US Army self-propelled artillery, the open-topped gun compartment left the crew vulnerable to small arms fire and shrapnel, and the engines were sometimes criticized for being underpowered. Nonetheless, in a conflict in which enemy units frequently infiltrated or overran forward positions, the battlefield mobility, defensive firepower, and armor of the M41 was seen as being greatly preferable to that of towed artillery pieces, and the performance of the 105 mm M7 howitzer motor carriage and M41 in the war influenced the U.S. Army to develop new self-propelled artillery in the 1960s, such as the M109, that would almost entirely replace towed field howitzers.

== Variants ==
- T64: prototype based on M5A1 Stuart chassis – 1 built
- T64E1: definitive prototype based on lengthened M24 Chaffee chassis – 1 built
- M41 Gorilla: the production model

== Operators ==
- United States – US Army (85 produced)
- France – French Army (in the 32nd and 68th Divisional Heavy Artillery Regiments (Régiment d'Artillerie Lourde Divisionnaires). These regiments comprised two groups, each with two batteries of four M41s (16 in total) and four MGR-1 Honest John missile launchers)
- China – People's Liberation Army (2 captured)

== Surviving vehicles ==
- One is located at the US Army Artillery Museum at Fort Sill, Oklahoma, USA
- One is located in the Military Museum of the Chinese People's Revolution, Beijing, China

== See also ==
- List of U.S. military vehicles by model number
- List of U.S. military vehicles by supply catalog designation
- M44 self propelled howitzer

== Bibliography ==
- Chamberlain, Peter; Ellis, Chris (1969), American and British Tanks of World War II, Arco Publishing
- Hunnicutt, R. P. (1992). Stuart: A History of the American Light Tank. Presidio Press. ISBN 0-89141-462-2.
