= Belgian campaign =

Belgian campaign may refer to:

- Waterloo campaign (1815)
- Ten Days' Campaign (1839)
- German invasion of Belgium (1914)
- German invasion of Belgium (1940)

== See also ==
- Flanders campaign
