= M51 Skysweeper =

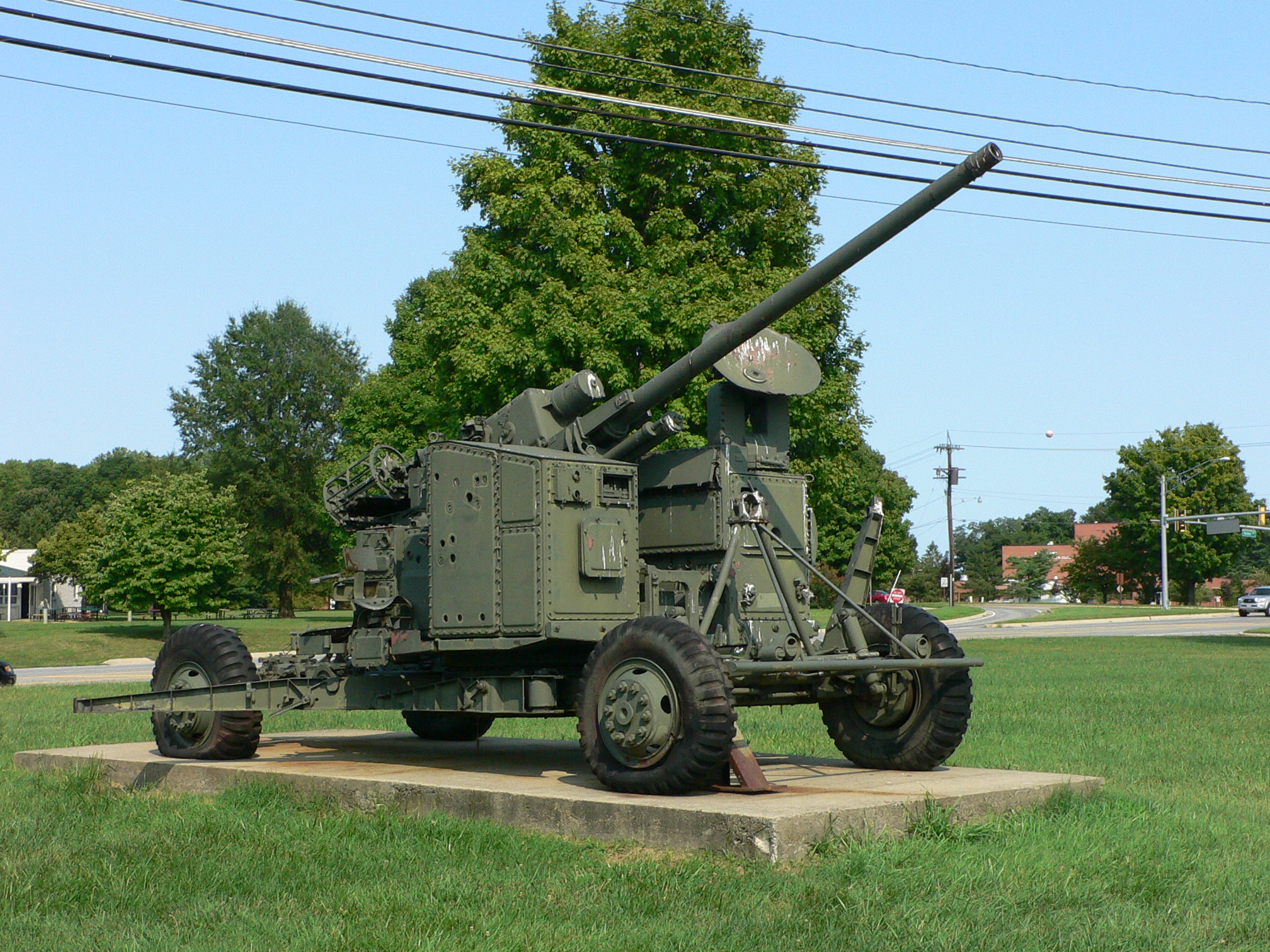
- Skysweeper on 4 wheeled carriage at the United States Army Ordnance Museum.
- Type: Anti-aircraft gun
- Place of origin: United States

Service history
- In service: 1951–1975
- Used by: United States; Greece; Japan; Turkey

Production history
- Produced: 1951

Specifications
- Mass: 8,750 lb (3,970 kg)
- Barrel length: 4.5 m (14 ft 9 in) 60 caliber
- Shell: Fixed QF 75 x 539mmR
- Caliber: 75 mm (3.0 in)
- Breech: Vertical sliding-wedge
- Recoil: Hydro-pneumatic
- Carriage: Four wheel with outriggers
- Elevation: -6° to +85°
- Traverse: 360°
- Rate of fire: 45 rpm
- Muzzle velocity: 854 m/s (2,800 ft/s)
- Effective firing range: 9 km (30,000 ft) (vertical)
- Maximum firing range: 13 km (43,000 ft) (horizontal)

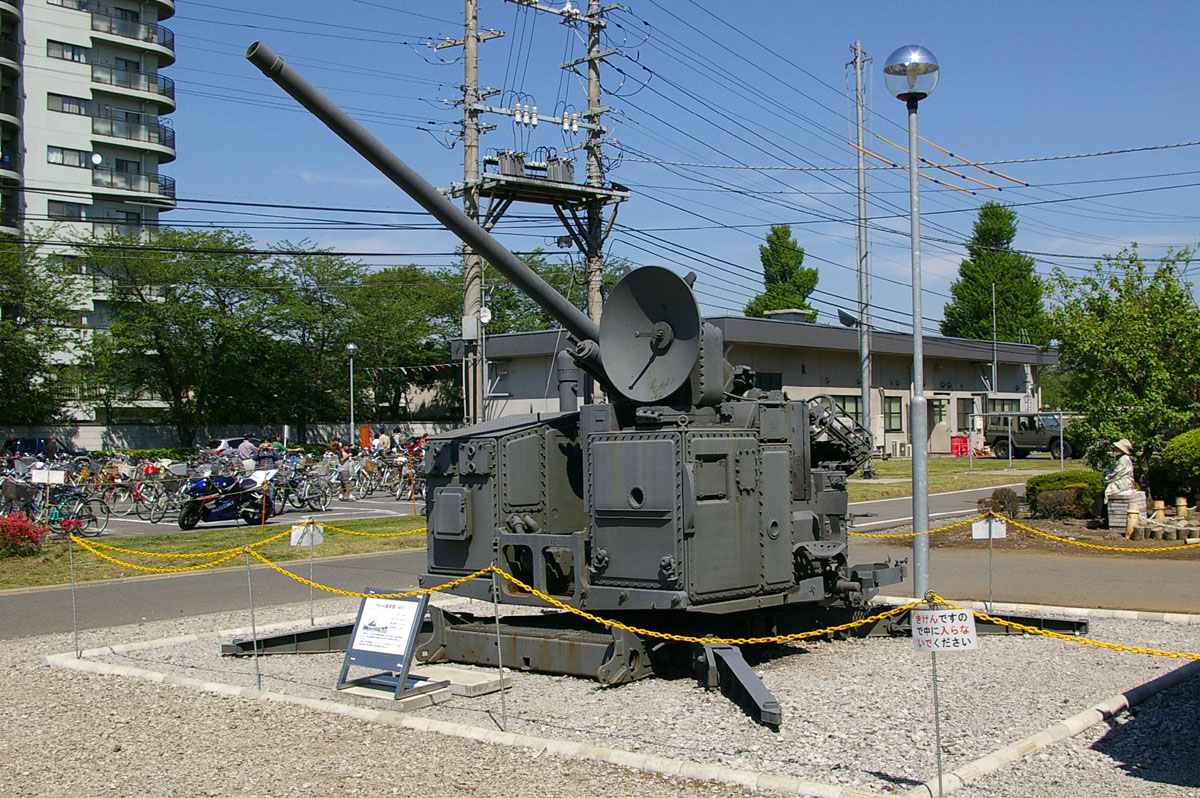
Retired Japan Ground Self Defense Force Skysweeper JGSDF Shimoshidu base, Chiba.

The M51 Skysweeper (Gun, M51, Antiaircraft or Gun automatic, 75-mm T83E6, and E7, recoil mechanism, and loader rammer) was an anti-aircraft gun deployed in the early 1950s by both the U.S. Army and U.S. Air Force. It was the first such gun to combine a gun laying radar, analog computer (director) and an autoloader on a single carriage.

The Skysweeper was introduced just as surface-to-air missiles were being deployed in the long-range role, replacing earlier anti-aircraft artillery systems. These missiles were very large and slow to react, which left short-range engagements to guns. The Army's existing guns were a motley collection of World War II-era systems that were barely effective then and were considered largely useless against jet-powered aircraft. Missiles replaced all of the larger weapons, while Skysweeper replaced all the smaller ones.

The Skysweeper system was used for a relatively short period of time, from the mid to late 1950s in the US, and into the 1960s and 1970s in some overseas locations. By that time newer missile systems were closing the range gap, and the Army was busy developing new weapons like the MIM-46 Mauler for this role.

== Development ==
Anti-aircraft guns naturally fall into several categories, each for a different altitude and speed requirement. High-altitude targets require very large guns to get the needed power into the shell to reach those altitudes, but at the same time have the advantage of not needing to move very fast because at that range the change in angle of the target was small—consider the seemingly slow motion of an airliner at cruise altitude. At very low altitudes there were only seconds in which to react when spotting an aircraft over local terrain, so a hand-swung weapon was the only possibility, no matter how inaccurate. The short ranges meant that accuracy was not needed, nor was a large gun needed to cover the range.

This left an intermediate altitude at which a small gun could not be used because the range to the aircraft was too far, and a larger gun could not be used because the targets were moving too fast. During World War II this niche had been covered by the Bofors 40 mm and similar weapons, but against modern jet-powered aircraft these were effectively useless because they simply didn't have the speed and weight of fire to be effective against targets that would be within range for only seconds. This led to the need for a new gun to address this intermediate-range role, and the Army defined this to be a weapon able to defeat aircraft flying at 1,000 mph (1,600 km/h) at altitudes up to 20,000 feet (6 km).

The Sperry Gyroscope Company developed the radar and computer, and development of what would become the Skysweeper started in 1948. A new 75 mm gun, known as the T83E1 or M35, was developed that had excellent muzzle velocity, along with two ten-round revolver-type magazines and an auto-loader that allowed it to reach 45 rounds/minute—about one third of what the much lighter Bofors had managed. This was mounted on a large square platform with powered traverse, which also mounted the box-shaped computer and manual gunsights on the right side, and the T-38 radar unit on the left. The T-38 radar had a range of about 30 km and could track aircraft traveling at up to 700 mph (1100 km/h).

The Army publicly announced the Skysweeper system in early 1953.

== Deployment ==
Skysweeper deployment began in the early 1950s. Skysweeper was also part of the Army Anti-Aircraft Command (ARAACOM) in the U.S near targets that would have to be attacked by low-altitude aircraft. During the 1950s the Army formed the Army Anti-Aircraft Command (ARAACOM) to operate batteries of anti-aircraft guns and missiles. Most ARAACOM deployments were around cities and used the 90 mm and 120 mm guns, as well as the Nike Ajax missile defense.

CONUS had 896 120mm and 75mm Sky Sweepers in service in 1953. Most were along the NE Corridor from Boston to District of Columbia and in Washington State.

In 1957, ARAACOM was renamed to US Army Air Defense Command (USARADCOM, ARADCOM in 1961) and, ARAACOM started to dramatically replace gun sites with fewer missile sites (ARADCOM ended in 1975).

By the end of 1957 Skysweeper battalions remained at Sault Ste. Marie, Michigan, to protect the Soo Locks (one battalion), Savannah River Site (two), and one 90mm and two Skysweeper battalions at Thule Air Base, Greenland (all were removed by 1959). The last overseas Skysweeper were deactivated in the mid-1970s, being wholly replaced by other more advanced anti-air missile systems.

== Survivors ==
- Two Skysweepers are on display at the Air Defense Artillery Museum at Fort Sill, Oklahoma, one in the ADA Park and one at the temporary museum facility.
- A Skysweeper is part of the outdoor exhibit at the Rock Island Arsenal Museum in Illinois
- A pair of Skysweepers in varying states of preservation are on display at the Fort Lewis Museum outdoor exhibit at Joint Base Lewis-McChord, Washington.
- A pair of Skysweepers are on display outside the gate of Camp Rilea just south of Warrenton, Oregon.
- There is a Skysweeper on display outside of the VFW in Elberton, GA.
- One Skysweeper is on display outside of the VFW in Ely, NV.
- One Skysweeper is on display at the International Artillery Museum, St. Jo, Texas.
- One Skysweeper is on display at The American Military Museum, South El Monte, California.
- One Skysweeper is on display at the JGSDF Shimoshidu base, Chiba. Japan.

== See also ==
- AZP S-60 – 57 mm anti-aircraft gun that served the same role in the Soviet Army
- Self-propelled anti-aircraft weapon
