= M40 Gun Motor Carriage =

American self-propelled artillery vehicle

155 mm gun motor carriage M40
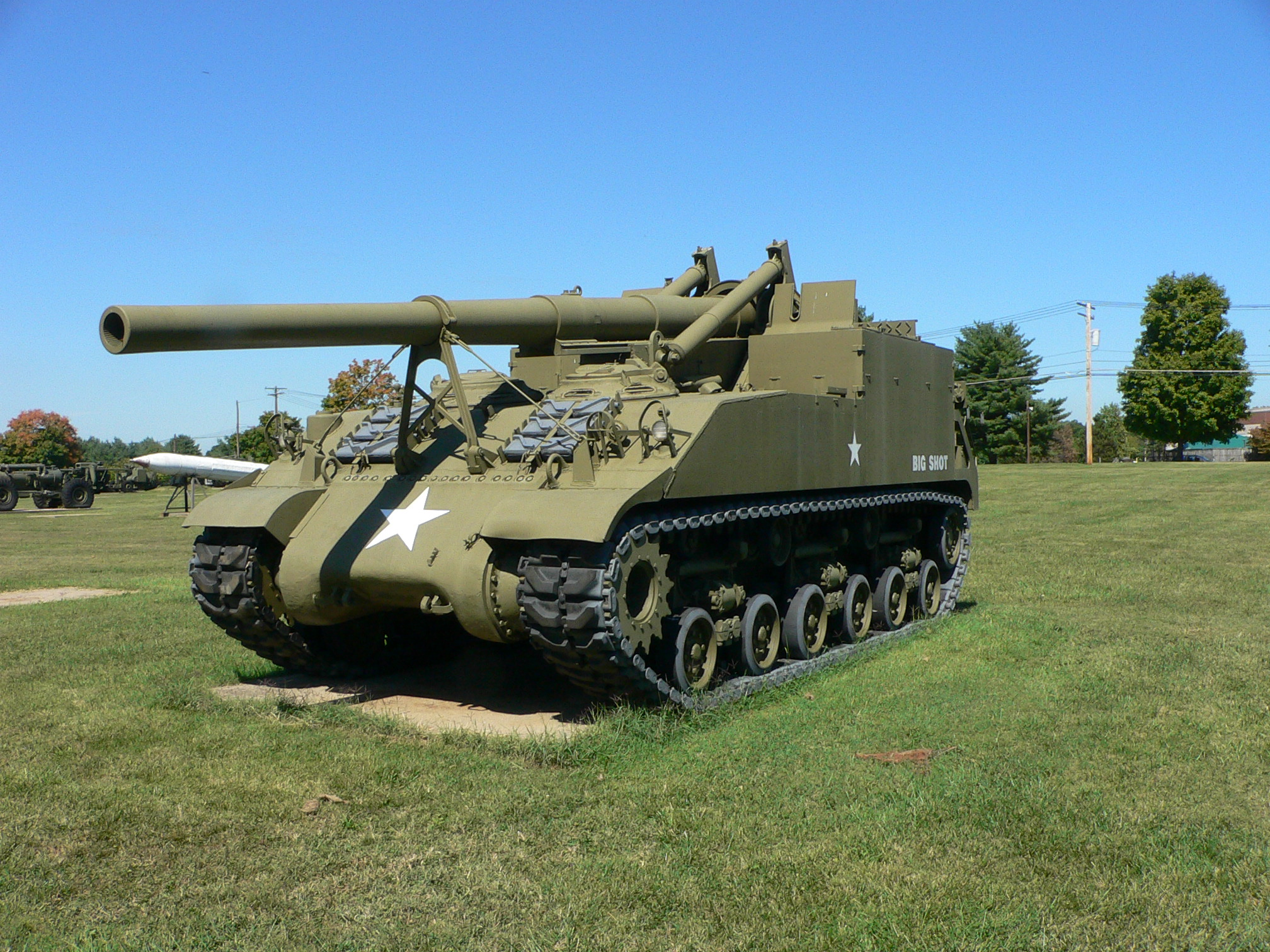
- M40 in the US Army Ordnance Museum
- Type: Self-propelled artillery
- Place of origin: United States

Service history
- In service: 1945–1953
- Used by: United States; United Kingdom; France
- Wars: World War II; Korean War

Production history
- Designer: Ordnance Department
- Designed: 1944 – 1945
- Manufacturer: Pressed Steel Car Company
- Produced: 1945
- No. built: 418 (24 converted to 8" HMC M43)

Specifications
- Mass: 36.3 metric tons (80,000 lb)
- Length: 9.1 m (29 ft 10 in)
- Width: 3.15 m (10 ft 4 in)
- Height: 2.7 m (8 ft 10 in)
- Crew: 8 (Commander, driver, 6 gun crew)
- Armor: 12 mm
- Main armament: 155 mm Gun M1A1 or M2 (20 rounds)
- Engine: Wright (Continental) R975 EC2; 340 hp (253 kW)
- Power/weight: 9.36 hp/t
- Suspension: HVSS (Horizontal Volute Spring Suspension)
- Operational range: 170 km (106 mi)
- Maximum speed: 38 km/h (24 mph) on road 23 km/h (14 mph) off-road

The 155 mm gun motor carriage M40 was an American self-propelled artillery vehicle built on a widened and lengthened medium tank M4/M4A1 chassis, with a Continental engine and with HVSS (Horizontal Volute Spring Suspension), which was introduced at the end of World War II.

== Description ==
Equipped with a 155 mm M1A1 or M2 gun, it was designed to replace the earlier M12 gun motor carriage. Its prototype designation was the T83, but this was changed to the M40 in March 1945.

A single pilot vehicle was used in the European Theatre in 1945 by the 991st Field Artillery Battalion, along with a related 8-inch howitzer motor carriage T89, (later re-designated the M43 howitzer motor carriage) which was sometimes also equipped with a 155 mm barrel. A total of 311 out of a planned 600 were completed by the Pressed Steel Car Company before the end of the war, 24 of which were later converted into M43s. From there it was deployed during the Korean War.

After World War II, the M40 was used by the British Army, who designated it 155 mm SP, M40.

== Gun section ==
A complete gun section consisted of one M40 GMC and one M4A1 high speed tractor towing a 4-wheel, 8-ton M23 ammunition trailer. Each battery had four gun sections. The M4A1/M23 combination replaced the earlier M30 cargo carrier.

== Variants ==
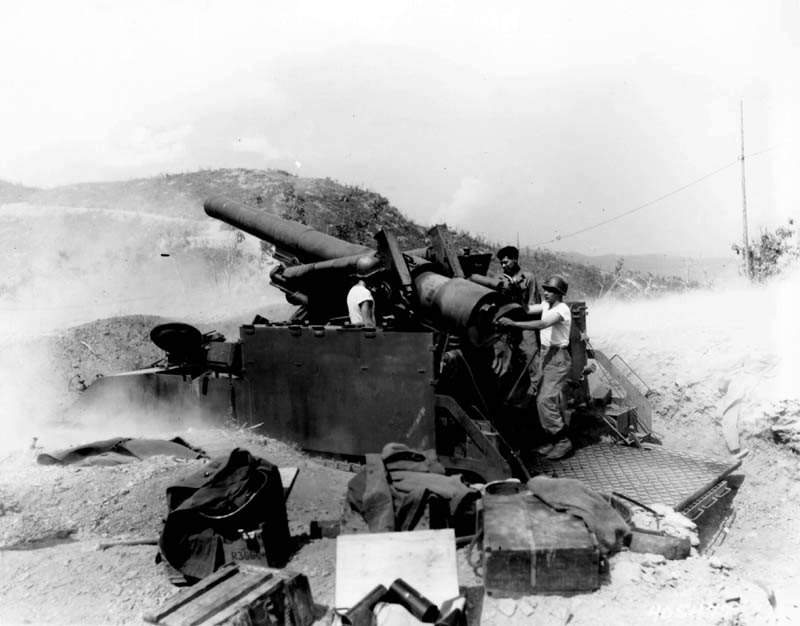
8-inch HMC M43 in Korea

The Army planned to use the same T83 chassis for a family of SP artillery:

- Cargo carrier T30 – despite several being built, its production was cancelled in December 1944 to make more chassis available for GMCs
- 8-inch howitzer motor carriage M43 – 8 in (203 mm) HMC, standardized August 1945, 48 built
- 250 mm mortar motor carriage T94 – 10 in (250 mm) MMC, began design Feb. 1945, one prototype completed by 1946

== Related vehicles ==
- 105 mm howitzer motor carriage M7B1 – self-propelled 105 mm howitzer motor carriage based on the M4A3 Sherman chassis
- 155 mm gun motor carriage M12 – self-propelled 155 mm gun motor carriage
  - Cargo carrier M30 – an M12 with crew and ammunition space in lieu of the gun.

== Surviving vehicles ==
- one at The American Military Museum, El Monte (USA)
- one at United States Army Ordnance Museum
- one at the Imperial War Museum, Duxford (UK)
- one at Royal Artillery Museum, Woolwich (UK)
- one at the Technik Museum, Sinsheim (Germany)
- two M40 GMCs – Arkansas National Guard Mus, Camp Robinson, Little Rock, AR (USA)
- one at City vehicle storage area, Charleston, AR (USA)
- one at Fort Chaffee Maneuvering Training Center, AR (USA)
- one at the United States Army Field Artillery Museum, Fort Sill, Ok (USA)
- one in workshop at BAIV B.V., Nederweert, Limburg (Netherlands)

== See also ==
- List of "M" series military vehicles
- M4 Sherman tank
- M41 Howitzer Motor Carriage
- G-numbers
