= M43 Howitzer Motor Carriage =

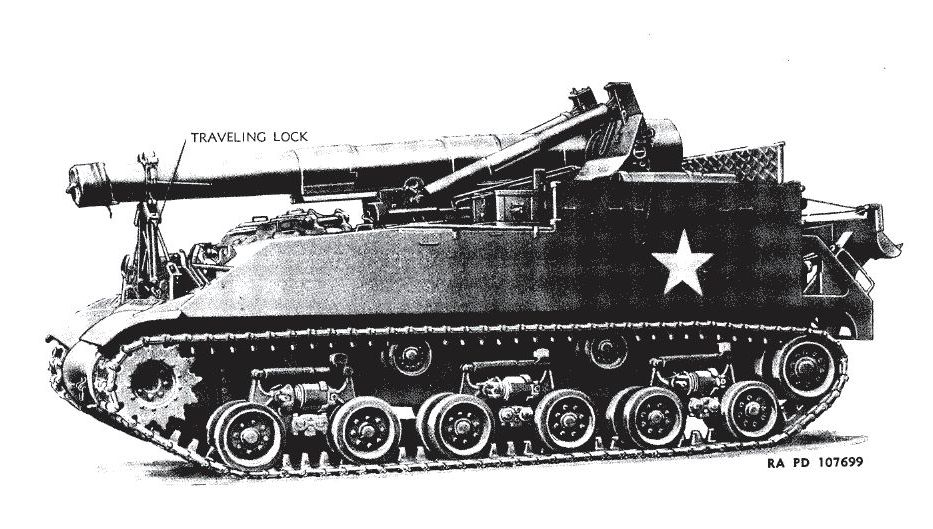
- M43 HMC
- Type: Self-propelled artillery
- Place of origin: United States

Service history
- In service: 1945 – 1953
- Used by: United States
- Wars: World War II; Korean War

Production history
- Designer: Ordnance Department
- Designed: 1944 – 1945
- Manufacturer: Pressed Steel Car Company
- Produced: 1945
- No. built: 24 (+ 24 converted from 155 mm GMC M40)

Specifications
- Mass: 83,000 lb (38 t)
- Length: 289 in (7.3 m)
- Width: 124 in (3.1 m)
- Height: 129 in (3.3 m)
- Crew: 8 (Commander, driver, 6 gun crew)
- Shell: separate loading, bagged charge
- Caliber: 8 in (203 mm)
- Rate of fire: Sustained:
- Muzzle velocity: 1,925 ft/s (587 m/s)
- Effective firing range: Conventional:
- Maximum firing range: 16,800 m
- Feed system: hand
- Sights: M13 or M6
- Main armament: 8-inch Howitzer M2
- Engine: Continental R-975-C4; 400 hp (300 kW)
- Suspension: HVSS (Horizontal Volute Spring Suspension)
- Operational range: 107 mi (172 km)
- Maximum speed: 24 mph (39 km/h)

The 8-inch Howitzer Motor Carriage M43 was an American self-propelled artillery vehicle built on a widened and lengthened medium tank M4/M4A1 chassis, with a Continental engine and HVSS that was introduced at the end of World War II. The M43 shared the same chassis as the more widely produced M40 Gun Motor Carriage, which instead mounted a 155 mm gun, and were designed by the Pressed Steel Car Company. A production run of 576 was planned originally, but in the end only 24 were produced and another 24 were converted from M40 hulls. The M43 went on to serve in the Korean War, and was retired after its conclusion.

== History ==
Equipped with a M115 203 mm (8-inch) howitzer, it was designed to replace the earlier M12 gun motor carriage. Its prototype designation was the T89, but this was changed to the M43 in March 1945. The 41.5-ton vehicles struggled to keep up with mechanized formations, but were successful when employed in more stationary roles.

=== Operational service ===
A single pilot vehicle was deployed in Europe before the end of World War II and was used in action by the 991st Field Artillery Regiment, first seeing action as part of Zebra Force in February 1945 in the capture of Cologne.

M43s were used in action in the Korean War, where they were well suited to the static fighting there, their high angle of fire permitting them to hit the rear slopes of hills.

== Variants ==
- 8-inch Howitzer Motor Carriage M43 – 8 in (203 mm) HMC, standardized August 1945; 48 were built.
- Cargo Carrier T30 – a few built before cancellation in December 1944 to make more chassis available for GMCs.
- The Army planned to use the same T38 chassis for a family of SP artillery.

== Surviving vehicles ==
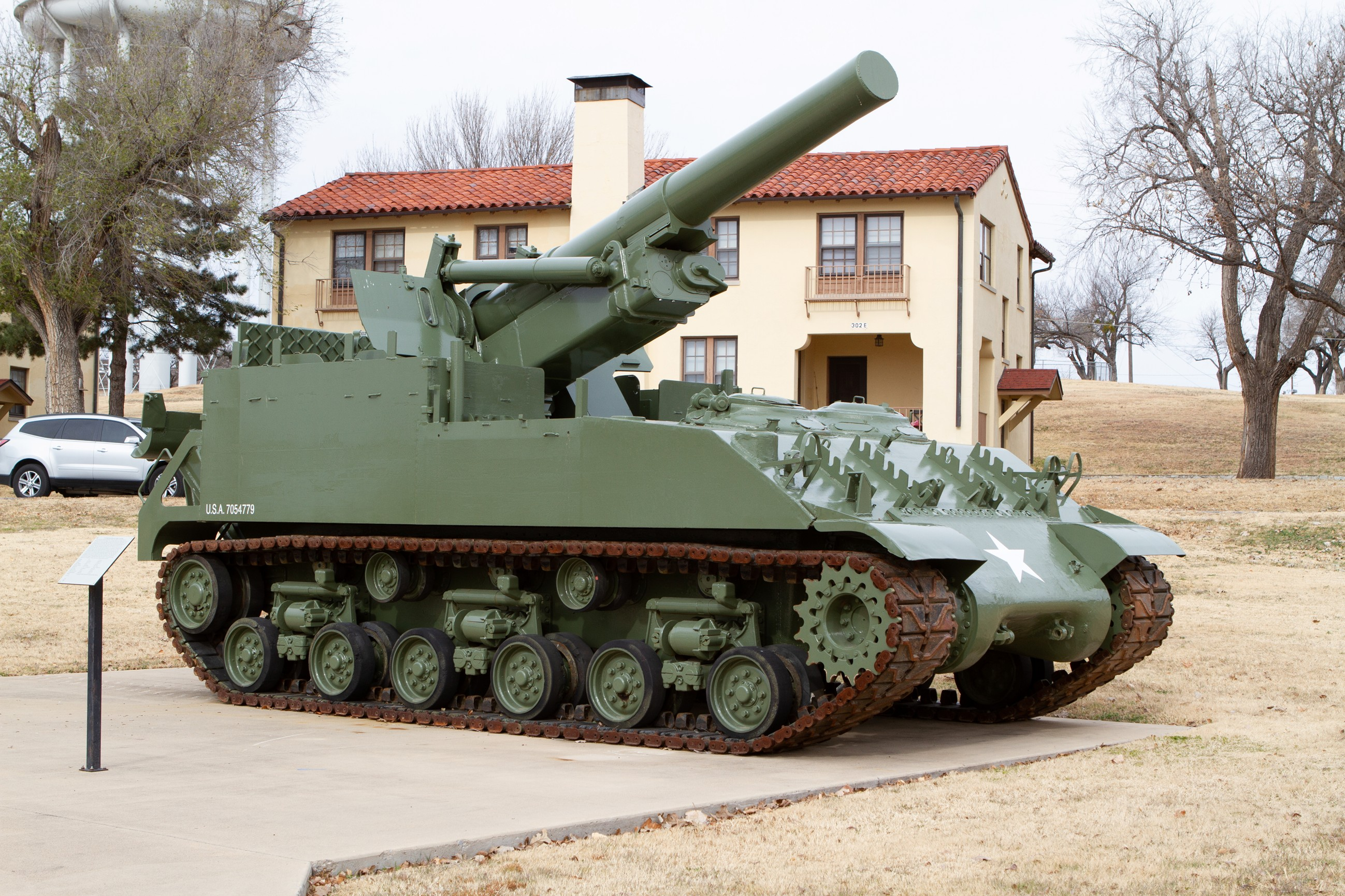
M43 Howitzer at Ft. Sill, OK.

- one at the Fort Sill museum, OK
- one in Wyoming, MI
- one in The American Military Museum, South El Monte, CA

== In popular culture ==
Despite its small production run, the M43s are featured in the computer games World of Tanks and R.U.S.E.

== See also ==
- List of "M" series military vehicles
- List of U.S. military vehicles by model number
- List of U.S. military vehicles by supply catalog designation
- M4 Sherman tank
- M55 self-propelled howitzer

== External links and references ==
- Tech Manual TM9-747
- Surviving M40 and M43
- SNL G232
