= The American Military Museum =

- Established: January 1962
- Location: 1918 Rosemead Boulevard, South El Monte, CA 91733
- Coordinates: 34.05°N 118.064°W
- Type: Armor & Artillery Museum
- Key holdings: Military vehicles and artillery
- Visitors: Open to the public
- Website: tankland.com

The American Military Museum (also known as Tankland) is a privately owned museum in South El Monte, California, USA. It is dedicated to tanks, armoured vehicles and artillery from the Second World War and post war periods and contains over 180 vehicles.

== Collection ==
=== Armored vehicles ===
- M3 half-track
- M4A3 Sherman
- M5A1 Stuart
- M7 Priest
- M8 Greyhound
- M40 Gun Motor Carriage
- M42 Duster
- M43 Howitzer Motor Carriage
- M47 Patton
- M50 Ontos
- M53
- M56 Scorpion
- M551 Sheridan
- Cadillac Gage Commando

=== Artillery ===
- 5-inch/51-caliber gun
- M51 Skysweeper

=== Other vehicles ===
- Willys M38
- M151A2
- M422 Mighty Mite

=== Aircraft ===
- Bell UH-1B Huey gunship
