= Pressed Steel Car Company =

Rolling stock manufacturer

- Industry: Railcar manufacturing
- Founded: 1899
- Defunct: 1956
- Headquarters: Pittsburgh, Pennsylvania, United States
- Key people: Charles T. Schoen, President

The Pressed Steel Car Company was a builder of railroad cars and equipment based in Pittsburgh, Pennsylvania, that was founded in 1899, and had facilities in Pittsburgh and Chicago. It operated until 1956.

== Before World War II ==
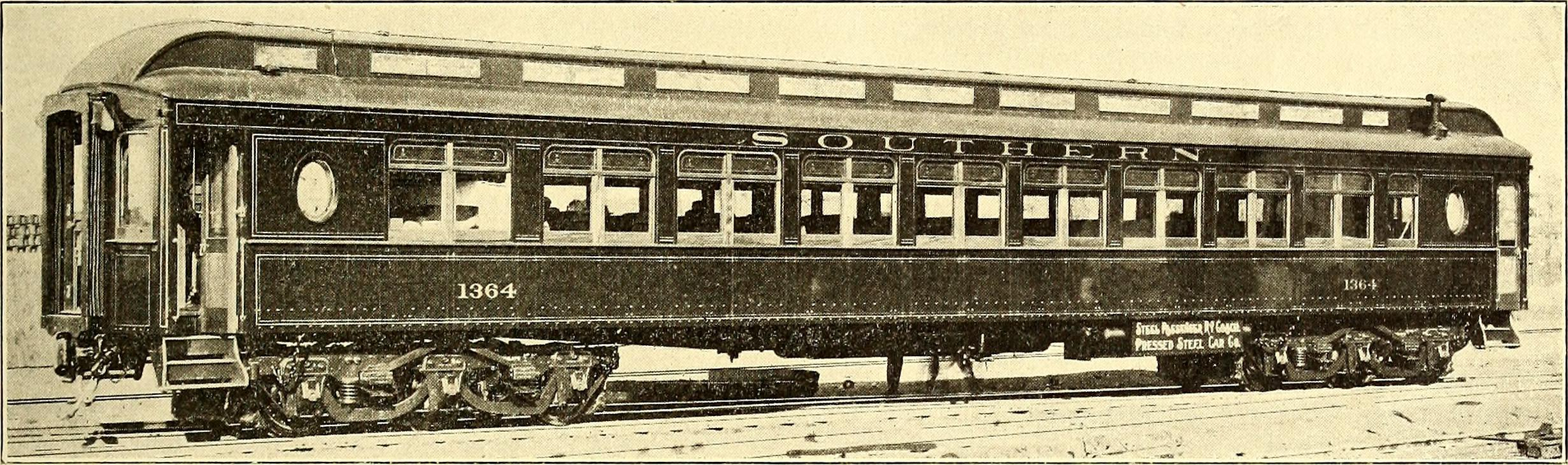
Passenger car for the Southern Railway, 1909

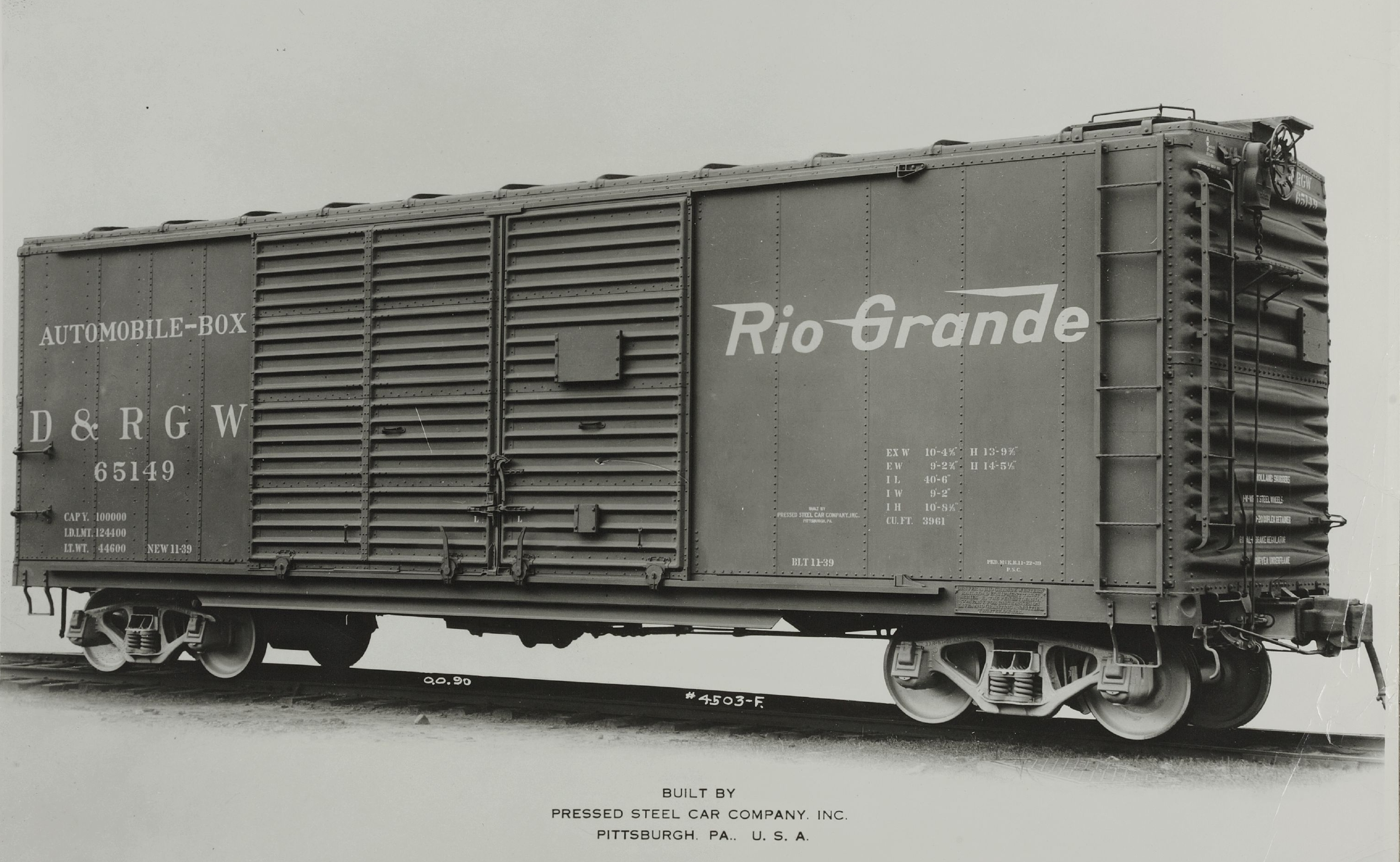
Boxcar for the D&RGW, 1939

The Pressed Steel Car Company of Pittsburgh came into existence 17 February 1899 and was an amalgamation of the Schoen Pressed Steel Company, Pittsburgh, and the British company, the Fox Solid Pressed Steel Company, set up in 1889 in Joliet, 30 miles southwest of Chicago.

In April 1899, it had three plants: The Schoen plant at Woods Run in Allegheny, Pennsylvania; the Fox steel plant on McCandless Avenue in Pittsburgh, Pennsylvania, and the Fox steel plant in Joliet, Illinois. Approximately one month after forming, a deal was announced that the Pressed Steel Car Company would purchase all of its steel from the Carnegie Steel Company, and Carnegie would stop making cars. At first the company only produced freight cars, but in 1903 it delivered 35 steel underframe passenger cars to the North Western Elevated Railway of Chicago, and then set up a shop just for passenger car manufacturing in less than two years.

In 1909, the Pressed Steel Car Strike of 1909 occurred, when 8,000 workers at the McKees Rocks plant went on strike. In 1914 the company manufactured 12,000 cars of differing varieties, for Russia. By 1916 it produced a new car approximately every five minutes and was the largest car plant in the United States. In early July 1936, the company filed for bankruptcy due to decreased earnings, debt and the inability to sell funding stock. On July 24, 1936, it was incorporated as the Pressed Steel Car Company, Inc. As of May 17, 1938, it employed 2,000 employees, as well as 1, 225 employees in subsidiary companies.

== Contribution to the U.S. war effort ==
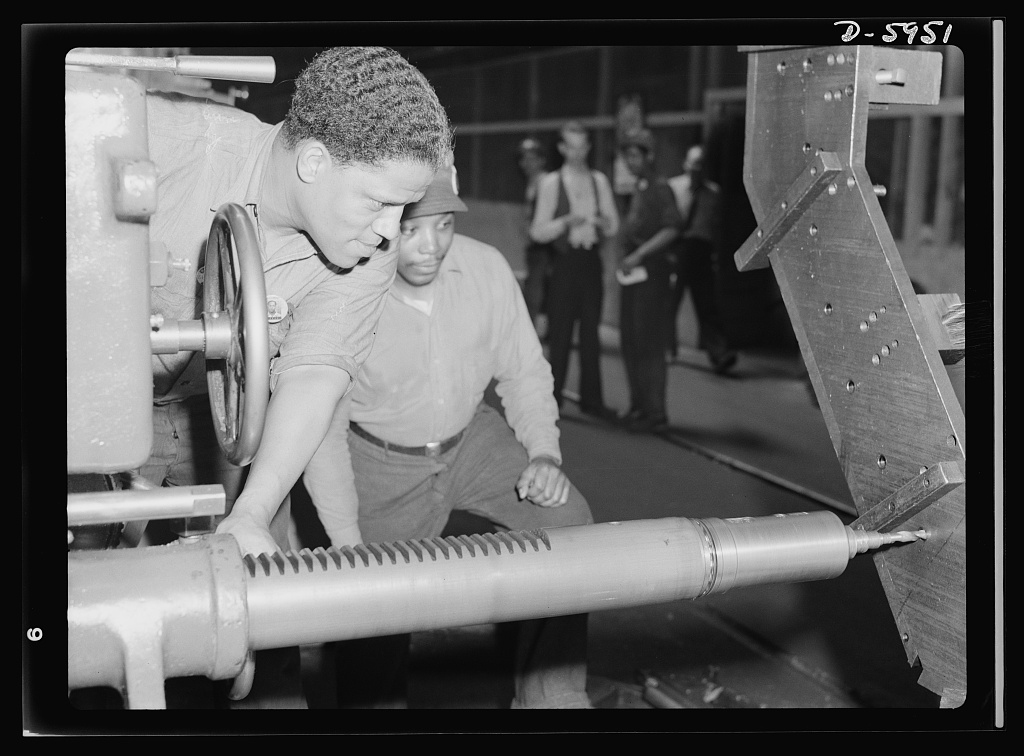
A skilled machine operator makes parts for medium tanks at the Hegewisch, Chicago, plant in 1942

Pressed Steel Car Company ranked 41st among United States corporations in the value of World War II military production contracts. It was involved in the design and production of 24 M43 howitzer motor carriages and 311 M40 gun motor carriages., T29 Heavy Tanks, T30 Ammunition Carriers, M7 Gun Motor Carriages, M3 Light Tanks (501,) M4 Medium Tanks (1000) along with its variants totaling in over 8600 in M4 series - M4A1 (3700,) M4A2 (21,) improved M4A1 (3396,) M32 Tank Recovery Vehicles (over 900.) In May 1940, Britain had a pressing need for more tanks, and started looking for suppliers of the M3 Grant in the United States. The British Purchasing Commission chose the Pressed Steel Car Company as one of the suppliers and placed an order for 501 M3 tanks on October 25, 1940. On July 13, 1941, the first Pressed Steel completed the first M3 Grant tank for the British.

== After World War II ==
The company resumed railroad-car production after World War II, eventually diversifying into non-railway products and changing its name to U.S. Industries in 1954. In 1956, U.S. Steel purchased all remaining assets of the company.

== Officers ==
President	Charles T. Schoen
1st Vice President	E.N. Dickerson
2nd Vice President	Henry W. Oliver Jr.
3rd Vice President	W.H. Schoen
Secretary	W.O. Jacquette
Treasurer	W.C. DeArmond
General Manager	F.A. Schoen
Sales Agent	J.B. Brady
