= Flanders campaign =

Flanders campaign may refer to:

- 1709 campaign in the War of the Spanish Succession
- Low Countries theatre of the War of the First Coalition (1792–1795) during the French Revolutionary War
- Battle of Flanders (disambiguation), any of a series of battles in the First World War (1914–1918)
- Campaign during the German invasion of Belgium (1940)
