= M55 self-propelled howitzer =

M55
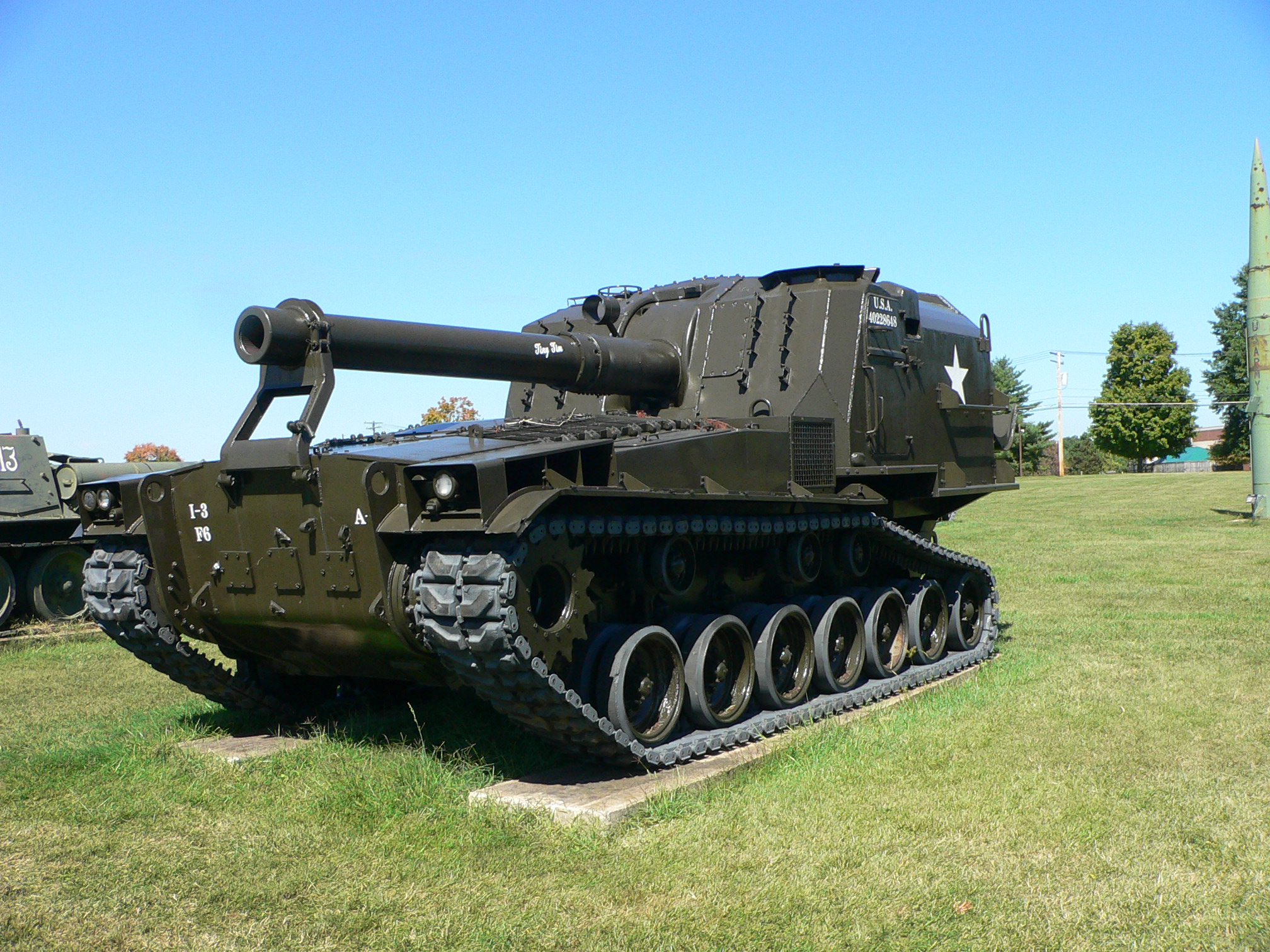
- M55 howitzer in the US Army Ordnance Museum
- Type: Self-propelled artillery
- Place of origin: United States

Service history
- In service: 1952–1960s (United States)
- Used by: United States; Belgium; Turkey; Spain; West Germany; Republic of China; Italy
- Wars: Vietnam War; Second Taiwan Strait Crisis

Production history
- Manufacturer: Pacific Car and Foundry Company
- Produced: 1950s

Specifications
- Mass: 44 metric tons
- Length: 9.75 m
- Crew: 6
- Armour: 1 in (25 mm) (Rolled homogeneous armour)
- Main armament: 203 mm (8 in) M47 howitzer (10 rounds)
- Secondary armament: .50 cal M2HB machine gun (900 rounds)
- Engine: Continental AV1790-5B (12 cylinder, 4 cycle, 90° vee gasoline); 810 hp at 2800 rpm (gross); 704 hp at 2800 rpm (net)
- Transmission: Allison CD-850-4A (two ranges forward, one reverse)
- Suspension: torsion bar
- Operational range: 160 mi (260 km)
- Maximum speed: 30 mph (48 km/h)

The M55 is an American fully enclosed and armored self-propelled howitzer based on the M53 155 mm (6.1 in) self-propelled gun and with components taken from the M47 Patton.

== Description ==
It has a 203 mm (8 in) howitzer which can traverse 30° left or right, carrying 10 rounds of ammunition when fully combat loaded. The gun has a maximum range of 10.5 mi (16.9 km) with a rate of fire of one round every two minutes. A .50 caliber machine gun was mounted on top of the turret. The crew consists of six - a driver, commander, gunner, and three loaders. The M55 is lightly armored, 25 mm (1 in) of rolled homogeneous steel maximum, but sufficient to protect the crew from indirect artillery hits and small arms fire. The M53 has a 155mm gun, while the M55 uses the 203 mm (8 in).

The M55 uses components of the M47 Patton tank, but the automotive aspects are reversed. The engine is mounted in the front and is driven through a front-drive sprocket capable of a top speed of 30 mph (48 km/h). The driver's cupola is visible on the front left of the turret, and spare track blocks are stored on the turret front. Because the driver's seat is in the turret, a special seat is used to keep the driver facing forward, independent of the turret facing.

== Service ==
The M53 was produced from 1952 to 1955, being replaced with the M55 in 1956. The M55 first saw service in 1956 with the US army and was used during the Vietnam War until around 1969, and subsequently withdrawn from regular service in the German military (but kept in storage till 1990) in favor of the M110 howitzer. Other NATO countries also received some. The last M55 in service was withdrawn from the Belgian Army in the 1970s.

== Former Operators ==
- Belgium
- Spain
- Taiwan
- Turkey
- United States
- West Germany
- Italy

== See also ==
- M43 Howitzer Motor Carriage
