= 155 mm gun M1 =

Towed field cannon

M1 155 mm Long Tom
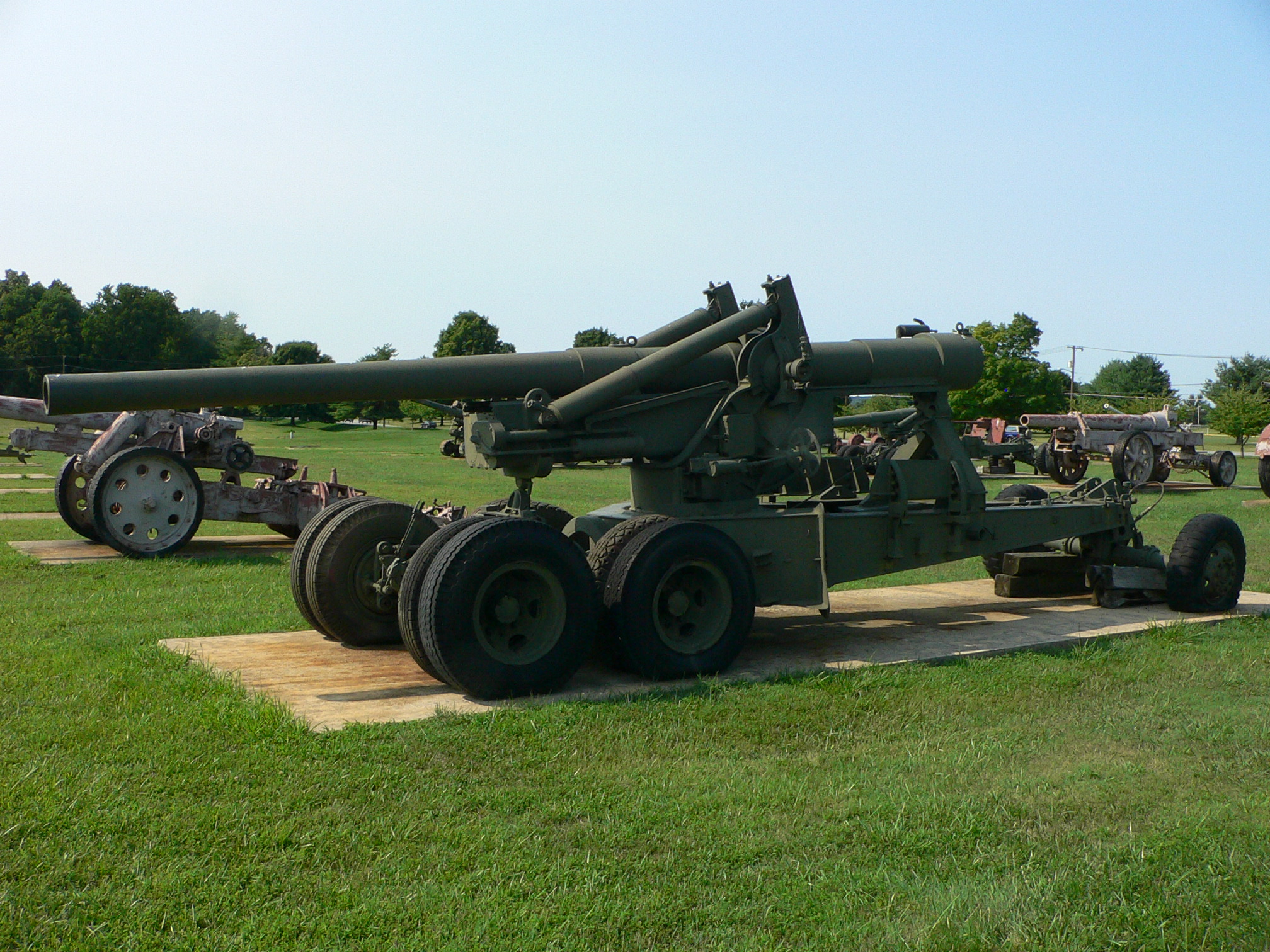
- Long Tom in travelling position, US Army Ordnance Museum
- Type: Towed field gun
- Place of origin: United States

Service history
- In service: 1941–1990s
- Wars: World War II; Korean War; Cambodian Civil War; Croatian War of Independence

Production history
- Designed: 1918–1938
- Produced: 1940–1945
- No. built: 1,882

Specifications
- Mass: Travel: 13,880 kg (30,600 lb)
- Length: Travel: 11 m (36 ft 1 in)
- Barrel length: 6.97 m (22 ft 10 in) L/45
- Width: Travel: 2.5 m (8 ft 2 in)
- Height: Travel: 2.7 m (8 ft 10 in)
- Crew: 14
- Shell: Separate loading charge and projectile
- Caliber: 155 mm (6.10 in)
- Breech: Asbury mechanism
- Recoil: Hydro-pneumatic
- Carriage: M1 Carriage
- Elevation: −2°/+65°
- Traverse: 60°
- Rate of fire: 40 rounds/hour
- Muzzle velocity: 853 m/s (2,799 ft/s)
- Maximum firing range: 23.7 km (14.7 mi)

The 155 mm gun M1 was a 155 mm field gun developed and used by the United States military. Nicknamed "Long Tom" (an appellation with a long and storied history in U.S. field and naval artillery), it was produced in M1 and M2 variants, later known as the M59. Developed to replace the 155 mm Gun M1918 GPF, the gun was deployed as a heavy field weapon during World War II and the Korean War, and also classed as secondary armament for seacoast defense. It was also supplied to the United Kingdom and France via Lend-Lease.

The gun could fire a 100 lb (45 kg) shell to a maximum range of 14 mi (23 km), with an estimated accuracy life of 1,500 rounds.

After World War II, the Long Tom was also adopted by a number of other nations, including Austria, Israel, and the Netherlands.

== Development ==
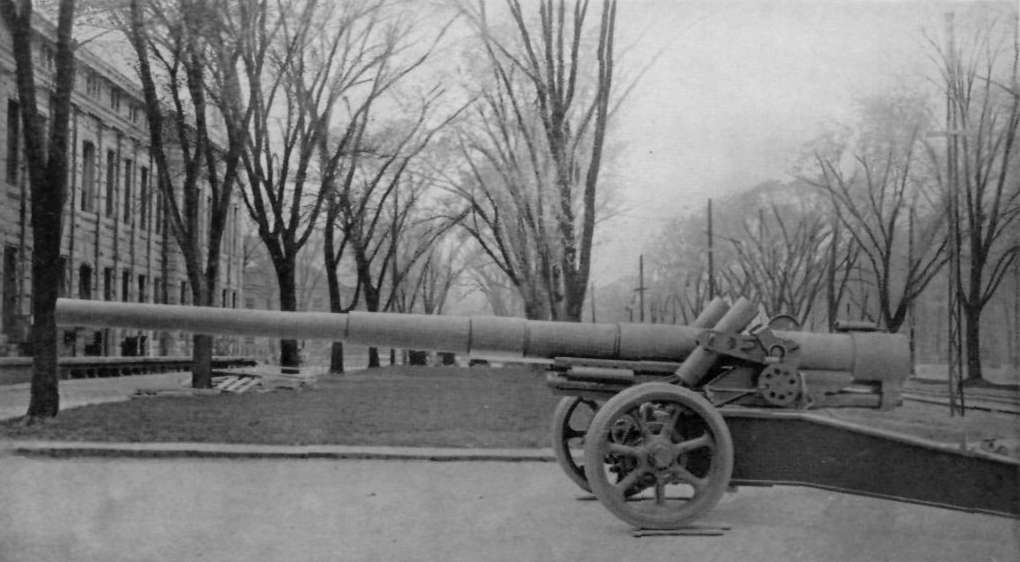
A wooden mock-up of a modified GPF gun with equilibrators to increase maximal elevation and range, 1920

Before entering World War I, the United States was poorly equipped with heavy artillery. To address this problem a number of foreign heavy artillery guns were adopted, including the Canon de 155 mm GPF. After the end of the war the Westervelt Board, named for its president, Brigadier General William I. Westervelt, was convened to assess the artillery experience of the combatant powers and map out future directions for the US Army artillery. The conclusion of the board vis-a-vis heavy field artillery was that the French 155 mm GPF should be adopted as the standard heavy field piece but further development work should occur to achieve a heavy field gun with a max. range of 25,000 yards (23 km), a vertical arc of fire from 0° to 65° (for comparison, GPF had only 35°), a projectile not exceeding 100 lb (45 kg) and the capability to be installed on a mount with either caterpillar tracks or rubber tires. A number of prototypes were produced in the 1920s (M1920 and M1920M1 were even standardized) and 1930s (a new design was started from scratch after 1929), the projects were repeatedly put on hold due to lack of funds. Developed in the summer of 1930, the radical split-trail carriage for both 155-mm gun and 8-inch howitzer designated T2 was the first in the US to feature an all-welded construction as well as a 8-wheel 2-axle roll-bearing bogie for high-speed mobility. In 1938 the 155 mm gun T4 on carriage T2 was finally adopted as 155 mm gun M1 on carriage M1.

=== 155 mm gun M1 ===
The new gun design used a barrel similar to the earlier 155 mm GPF, but with an Asbury mechanism that incorporated a vertically-hinged breech plug support. This type of breech used an interrupted-thread breech plug with a lock that opened and closed the breech by moving a single lever. The ammunition for the 155 mm gun was "separate-loading", that is with the shell and the powder charge packaged, shipped and stored separately. The shell is lifted into position behind the breech and then rammed into the chamber to engage the shell's rotating band into the barrel rifling.

Ramming the shell home is followed by loading a number of powder bags, as required for the desired range. The powder charge could be loaded in up to seven charge settings. Once the powder is loaded, the breech plug is closed and locked, and a primer is placed in the breech plug's firing mechanism. After setting the elevation and azimuth, the gun is ready to fire. The firing mechanism is a device for initiating the ammunition primer. The primer then sets off the igniter which ignites the propelling charge of the ammunition. A continuous-pull lanyard first cocks the firing pin, then fires the primer when pulled.

The gun was developed into M1A1 and M2 variants. After World War II, the United States Army re-organized, and the gun was re-designated as the M59.

=== Carriage M1 ===
The gun carriage provides a stable, yet mobile, base for the gun. The new split-trail carriage featured an eight-wheel integral two-axle bogie and a two-wheel limber that supported the trails for transport. The carriage was a two-piece design. The upper carriage included the side frames with trunnion bearings that supported the recoil mechanism that carried the gun cradle, slide and gun tube. The upper carriage also incorporated the elevating and azimuth gearing. The upper carriage pivoted in azimuth on the lower carriage. The lower carriage included the transport suspension and the split-trail that stabilized and absorbed recoil when the gun was fired.

After the gun was placed in a firing position with the gun pointing in the desired direction, the trails were lowered to the ground and the limber was removed. The carriage wheels would then be raised using built-in ratcheting screw-jacks, lowering the gun carriage to the ground. Once on the ground, the limber-end of the trail legs were separated to form a wide "vee" shape with its apex at the center of the carriage pivot point. A recoil spade at the limber-end of each trail leg required a correctly positioned hole to be dug for the spade, which was attached to the trail end, to transmit the recoil from gun carriage through the trails and into the earth. This made the gun very stable and assisted its accuracy. The removable spades were transported in brackets on the trail legs.

The carriage M1 and M2 were shared with the 8-inch (203 mm) Howitzer M1, differing only in the gun tube, sleigh, cradle, recoil and equilibrators, weight due to the heavier barrel.

The carriage consists of a combination of the following major components:
Bottom carriage	Top carriage
Firing support base	Elevating mechanism
Trails	Traversing mechanism
Retractable suspension system	Gun support components
Axle	Equilibrator
Brakes	Cradle (Connects gun assembly to the top carriage)
Wheels	Recoil mechanism
	Sleigh (Sliding support for the gun tube)
	Gun tube

== Specifications ==
Specifications from TM 9–350
Weight of gun (complete with breech mechanism)	9,595 lb (4,352 kg)
Weight of tube assembly (barrel)	9,190 lb (4,169 kg)
Length of tube	277.37 in (7.05 m)
Length of bore	cal. 45 (274.6 in / 6.975m)
Length of rifling	230.57 in (5.856 m)
Powder pressure (normal pressure with maximum charge in a new gun)	40,000 psi (275,790 kPa)
Type of breechblock	Interrupted screw
Weight of breech mechanism	405 lb (184 kg)
Type of firing mechanism	continuous pull percussion hammer

== Service ==
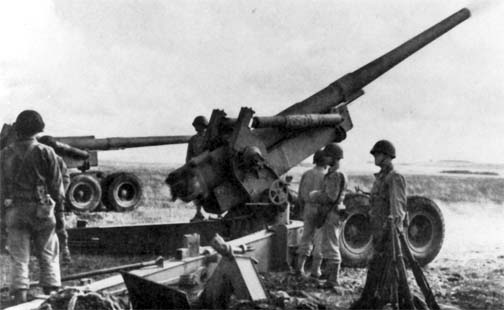
Long Tom at crew training in England

The Long Tom saw combat for the first time in the North African Campaign on 24 December 1942, with "A" Battery of the 36th Field Artillery Regiment. Eventually it equipped 33 U.S. Army corps-level artillery battalions in the European and Mediterranean Theaters (the 173rd, 190th, 200th, 208th, 240th, 261st, 273rd, 514th–516th, 528th, 530th, 540th, 541st, 546th–549th, 559th, 561st, 634th, 635th, 731st, 733rd, 734th, 766th, 976th–981st, 985th and 989th), and 8 in the Pacific Theater (the 168th, 223rd, 226th, 433rd, 517th, 531st, 532nd, and 983rd). The 353rd, 732nd, and 993rd Field Artillery Battalions were segregated 155 mm gun units that never went overseas. The 353rd was converted to the 1697th Engineer Combat Battalion (Colored) on 19 March 1944 at Camp Van Dorn, Mississippi, the 732nd was converted to the 1695th Engineer Combat Battalion (Colored) on 15 March 1944 at Camp Pickett, Virginia, and the 993rd was converted to the 1696th Engineer Combat Battalion (Colored) on 19 March 1944 at Camp Swift, Texas.

The 155 mm gun was also used by several Marine defense battalions, notably during Operation Cartwheel in 1943.

The preferred prime mover was initially the Mack NO 7½-ton 6x6 truck but from 1943 this was generally replaced by the tracked M4 high-speed tractor. 72 rounds of ammunition plus propelling charges could be carried in the M21 4-ton, 2-wheel ammunition trailer; 16 rounds of ammunition plus propelling charges could be carried in the M10 1-ton, 2-wheel ammunition trailer that was often used because of shortages of the former. The later heavy M23 8-ton, 4-wheel ammunition trailer introduced in 1945 could carry 96 rounds of ammunition plus propelling charges.

A small number of Long Tom guns were authorised for supply via Lend-Lease channels, to the United Kingdom (184) and France (25). The authorised establishment of British batteries (excluding training units), including four batteries from the Dominion of Newfoundland, totalled 88 guns.

== Variants ==
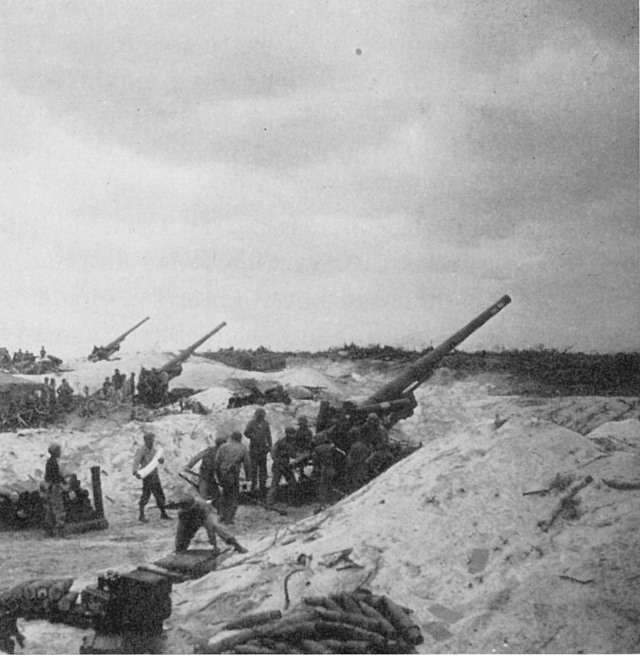
M2 during the Battle of Okinawa

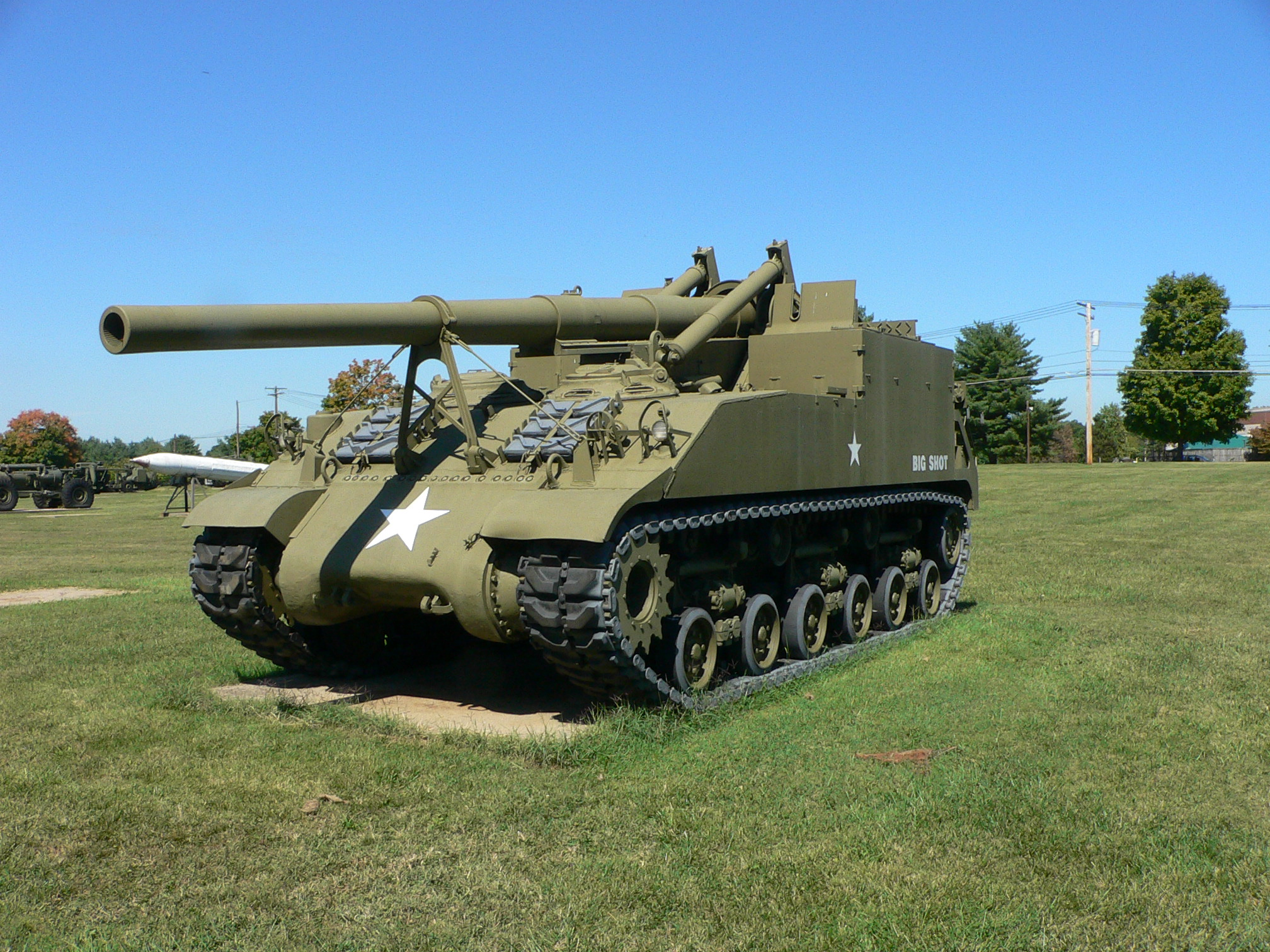
M40 in the US Army Ordnance Museum

Gun variants

- M1920 – prototype
- T4 – prototype
- M1 (1938) – first production variant, 20 built
- M1A1 (1941) – modified breech ring
  - M1A1E1 – prototype with chromium-plated bore
  - M1A1E3 – prototype with liquid cooling
- M2 Standard (1945) – with modified breech ring

Carriage variants

- T2 – prototype
- M1 (1938)
- M1A1 – refurbished T2 carriages
- M2 standard

Limber variants

- M1 standard (1938)
- M5 heavy (1945)

The gun was also mounted on a modified M4 medium tank chassis, in mount M13. The resulting vehicle was initially designated 155 mm gun motor carriage T83 and eventually standardized as 155 mm gun motor carriage M40. 155 mm gun motor carriage T79, based on T23 medium tank chassis, never advanced past proposal stage. A portable "Panama mount" M1 was also provided.

== Ammunition ==
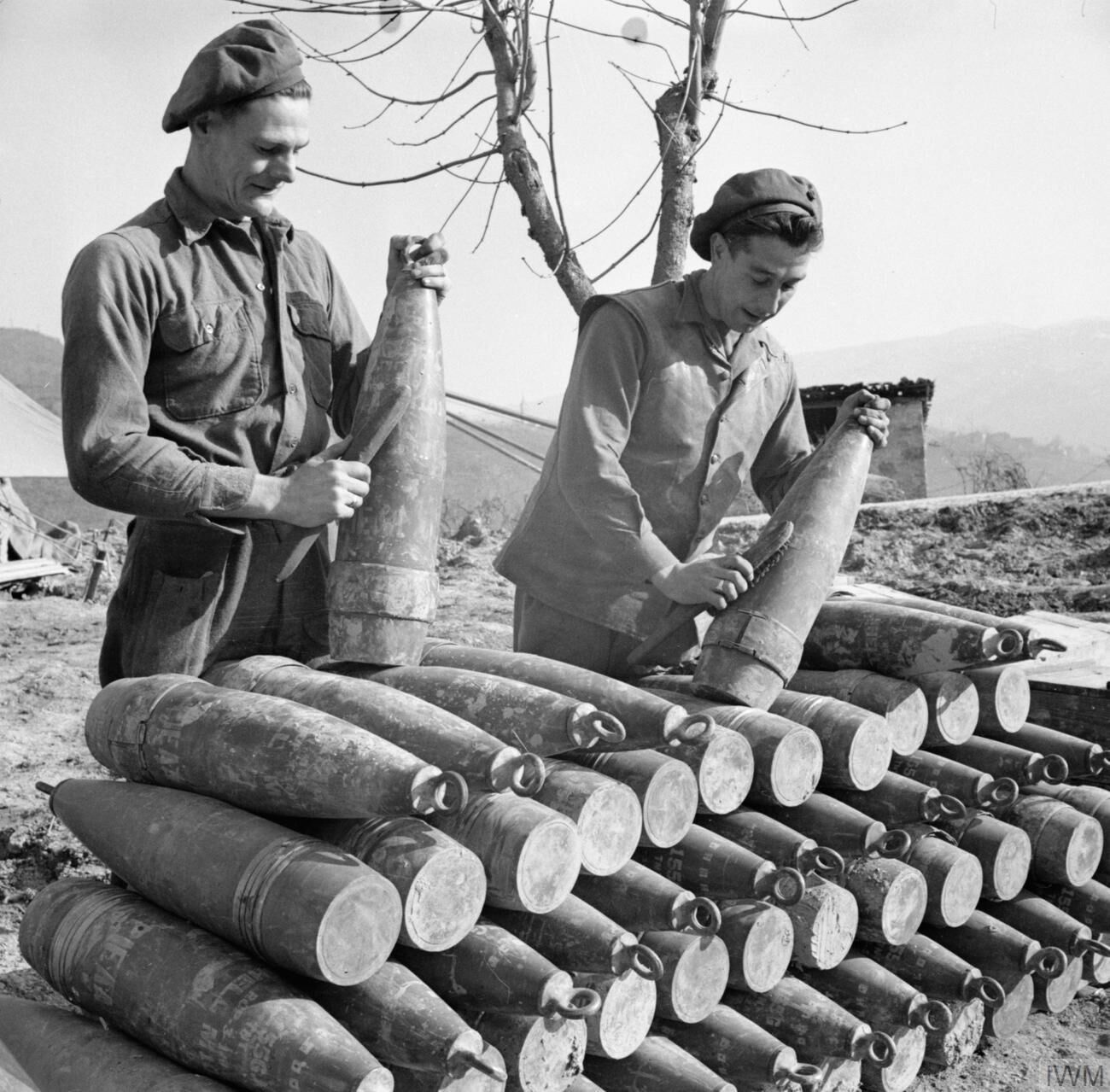
British gunners cleaning shells, Italy, February 1945

The gun used separate loading, bagged charge ammunition. The propelling charge consisted of base (9.23 kg) and increment (4.69 kg). The data in the table below is for supercharge (base and increment).

Projectiles.
Type	Model	Weight	Filler	Muzzle velocity	Range
APBC/HE	AP M112 Shell	45.36 kg (100.0 lb)	Explosive D	2746 ft/s (837 m/s)	24,075 yds (22,014 m)
HE	HE M101 Shell	42.96 kg (94.7 lb)	TNT	2800 ft/s (853 m/s)	25,714 yds (23,513 m)
Smoke	WP M104 Shell	44.53 kg (98.2 lb)	White phosphorus (WP)	2800 ft/s (853 m/s)	25,940 yds (23,720 m)
Smoke	FS M104 Shell		Sulfur trioxide in chlorosulfonic acid	2800 ft/s (853 m/s)	25,940 yds (23,720 m)
Chemical	H M104 Shell		Mustard gas, 5.3 kg (12 lb)	2800 ft/s (853 m/s)	25,940 yds (23,720 m)
Dummy	Dummy Mk I Projectile		–	–	–
Dummy	Dummy M7 Projectile	43.09 kg (95.0 lb)	–	–	–

Armor penetration, mm
	Distance		
Ammunition	457 m (500 yd)	914 m (1,000 yd)	1,371 m (1,500 yd)
AP M112 Shell (homogeneous armor, meet angle 30°)	160	152	
AP M112 Shell (face hardened armor, meet angle 30°)	135	130	
AP M112 Shell (homogeneous armor, meet angle 0°)	193	191	183
Concrete penetration, mm
Ammunition	914 m (1,000 yd)	4,572 m (5,000 yd)	
HE M101 Shell (meet angle 0°)	2,011	1,402	
Different methods of measurement were used in different countries / periods. Therefore, direct comparison is often impossible.

== Operators ==
- Australia
- Austria
- Croatia
- France
- Germany
- Greece
- Italy
- Jordan
- Republic of China
- Republic of Korea
- Pakistan
- South Africa
- Turkey
- United Kingdom
- United States
- Yugoslavia
- Netherlands

== Existing examples ==
=== Pakistan ===
- Pakistan Army Museum, Rawalpindi

=== Austria ===
- Bunkermuseum Wurzenpass, Wurzen Pass (near Villach)

=== Australia ===
- Fort Lytton Military Museum, Brisbane.

=== Canada ===
- St. John's Newfoundland, Royal Canadian Legion Pleasantville Branch 56.

=== Germany ===
- Grafenwoehr Training Area – this particular cannon is apparently a return from Italy, based on Italian language markings added, and old Pirelli tires.

=== Israel ===
- Batey ha-Osef Museum, Tel Aviv, Israel

=== Japan ===
- JGSDF Camp Kita-Chitose, Chitose, Hokkaido, Japan
- JGSDF Ordnance School, Ami, Ibaraki, Japan

=== Netherlands ===
- Wings of Liberation Museum Park in Best (near Eindhoven), Netherlands

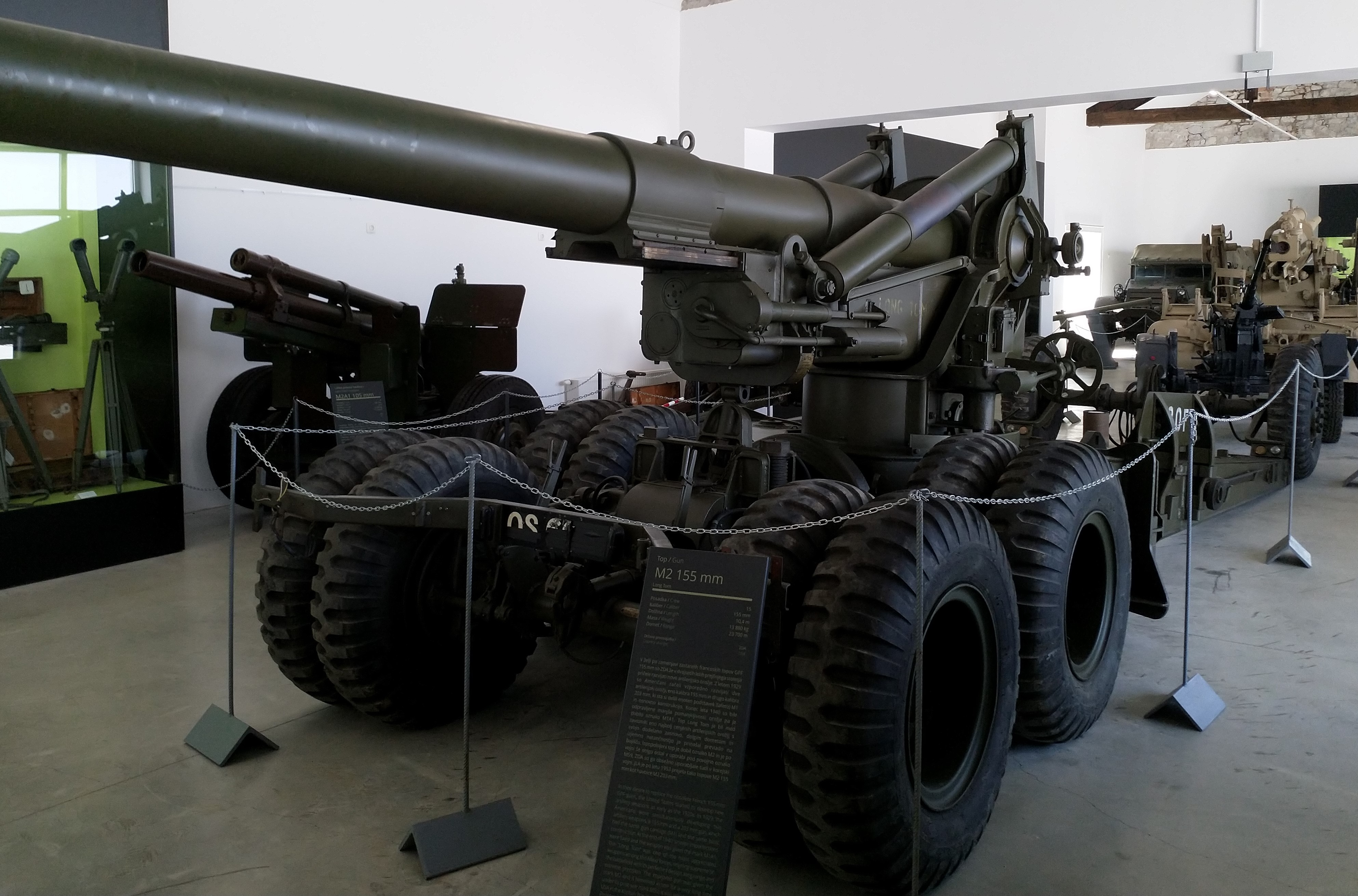
M1 155mm gun on display at Pivka Military History Park, Pivka, Slovenia

=== Slovenia ===
- Pivka Military History Park, Pivka, Slovenia

=== United Kingdom ===
- Pendennis Castle, Cornwall, UK
- Royal Armouries, Fort Nelson, Hampshire, UK
- Muckleburgh Military Collection, Norfolk, UK
- Eden Camp Museum, North Yorkshire, UK

=== United States ===
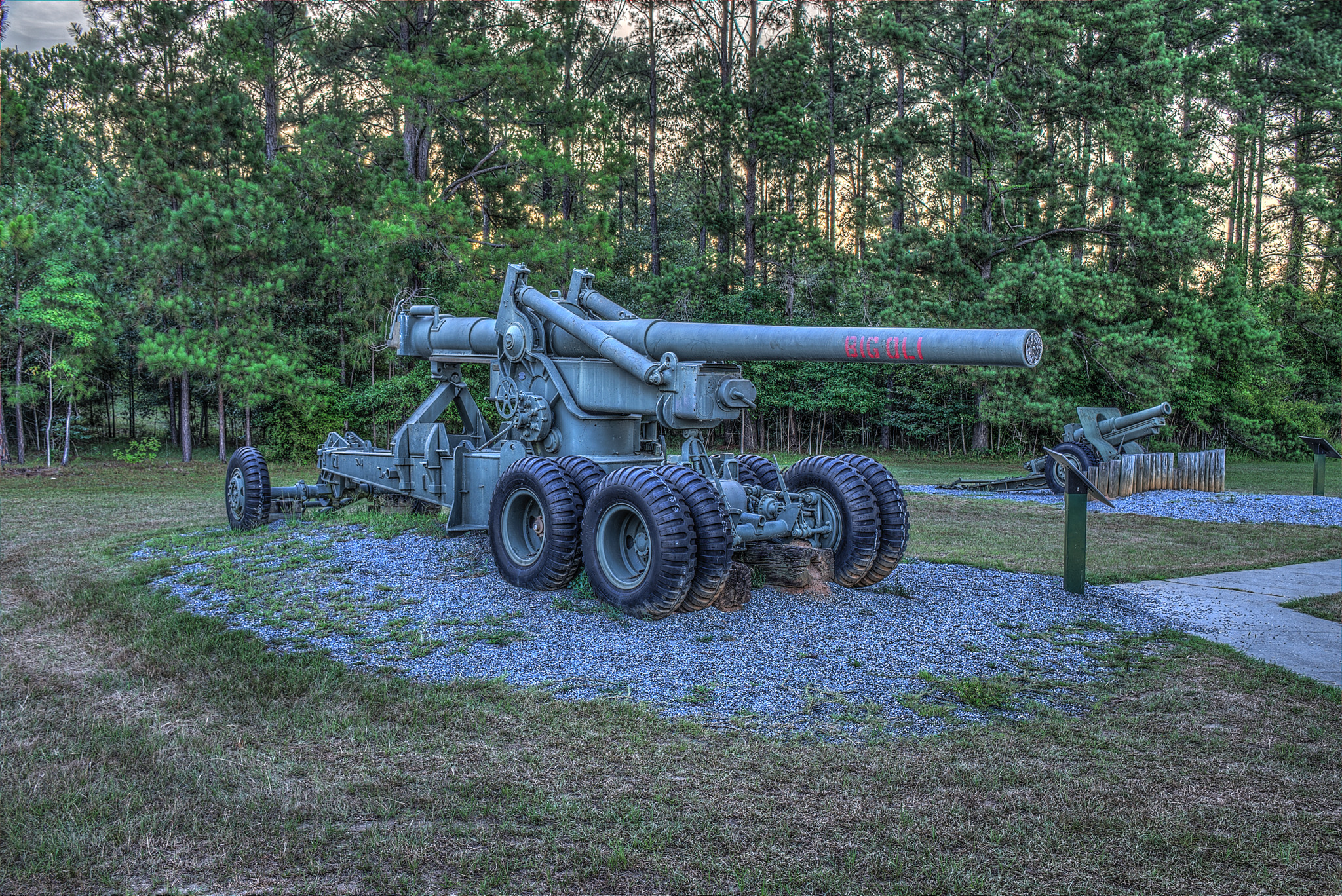
M1 on display at Georgia Veterans State Park

- International Artillery Museum, Saint Jo, Texas
- Fort Jackson, Columbia, South Carolina
- Battleship Memorial Park, Mobile, Alabama
- Timber Linn Park, Albany, Oregon
- US Army Ordnance Museum, Aberdeen, Maryland
- VFW Zachary Taylor Post 3784, Baton Rouge, Louisiana.
- Georgia Veterans Memorial State Park, Cordele, Georgia
- Fort Sill Field Artillery Museum, Fort Sill, Oklahoma
- Iowa Gold Star Military Museum, Camp Dodge, Johnston, Iowa
- VFW Post 2330, Searcy, AR
- Museum of American Armor, Old Bethpage, New York
- Scotland Meadows Park, New Castle, Pennsylvania
- General George Patton Museum and Center of Leadership, Fort Knox, Kentucky.
- VFW Post 61, Kansas City, MO
- Flying Heritage & Combat Armor Museum, Everett, WA
- Watervliet Arsenal, Watervliet, NY
- American Legion George Johns Post 447, Round Rock, Texas
- Camp Mabry, Austin, Texas
- Museum of the Kansas National Guard, Topeka, Kansas

== See also ==
- List of U.S. Army weapons by supply catalog designation SNL D-24
- 15 cm Kanone 18 German equivalent
- 152 mm gun M1935 (Br-2) Soviet equivalent, built only in small numbers
- Cannone da 149/40 modello 35 Italian equivalent, only few built
