= M12 Gun Motor Carriage =

155 mm gun motor carriage M12
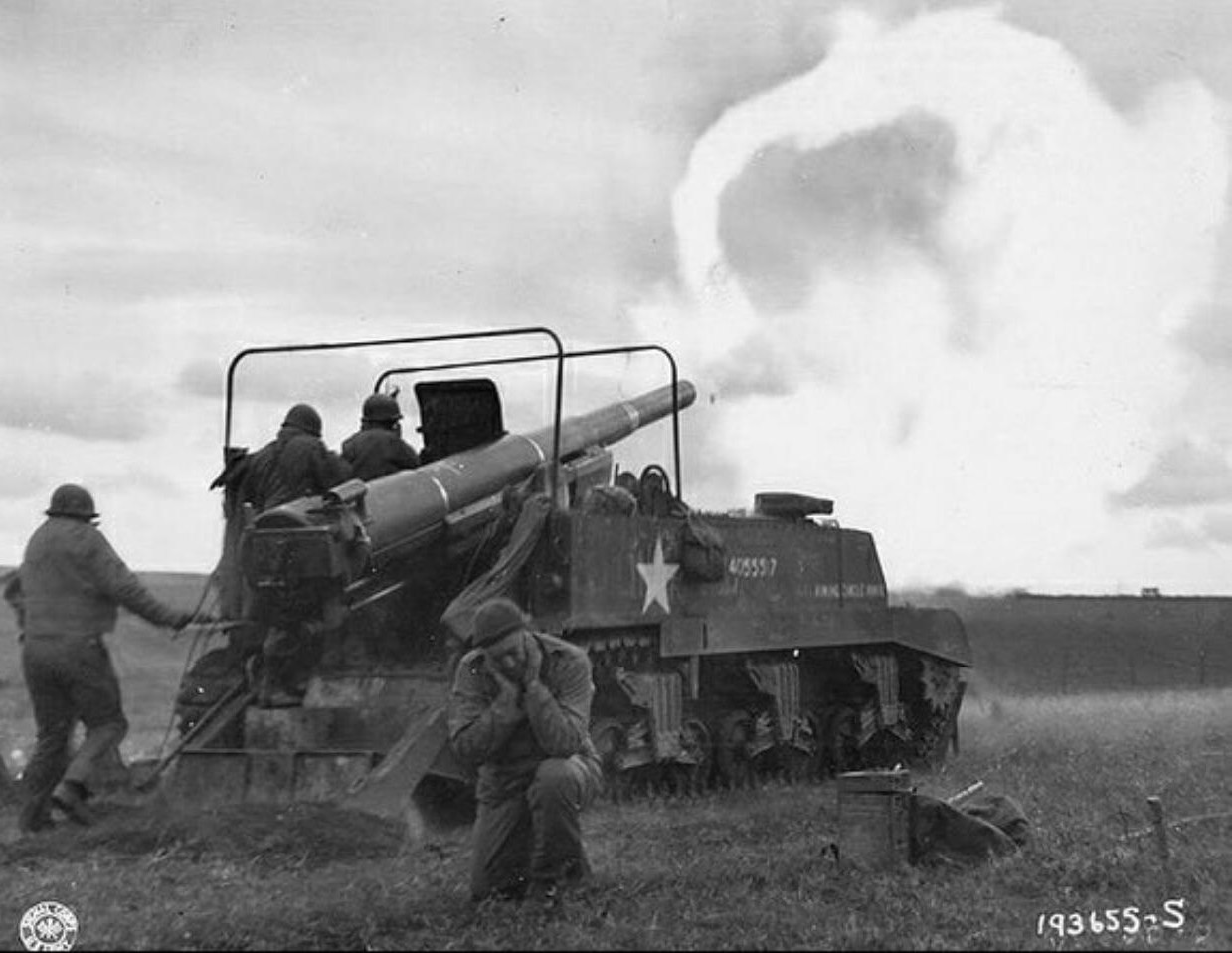
- M12 firing across the Moselle River in France, 1944.
- Type: Self-propelled artillery gun
- Place of origin: United States

Service history
- In service: 1942–1945
- Used by: United States
- Wars: World War II

Production history
- Designed: 1942
- Manufacturer: Pressed Steel Car Company
- Produced: September 1942 – March 1943
- No. built: 100
- Variants: M30 cargo carrier

Specifications
- Mass: 59,000 pounds (27 metric tons)
- Length: 22 ft 1 in (6.73 m) hull, spade retracted 22 ft 2.5 in (6.769 m) including gun
- Width: 8 ft 9 in (2.67 m) without sand shields
- Height: 9 ft 5.5 in (2.883 m) over gun shield
- Crew: 6 (Commander, driver, 4 gun crew) with remaining gun crew in M30
- Armor: 0.5–2 inches (13–51 mm)
- Main armament: 155 mm (6.1 in) M1917, M1918, or M1918M1 gun in Mount M4; 10 rounds
- Engine: Wright R975 C1; 350 horsepower (260 kW) at 2,400 rpm
- Power/weight: 13.06 hp/metric ton
- Suspension: Vertical volute spring suspension (VVSS)
- Operational range: 140 miles (230 km)
- Maximum speed: Road: 21–24 miles per hour (34–39 km/h)

The 155 mm gun motor carriage M12 was a U.S. self-propelled gun developed during World War II. It mounted a 155 mm gun derived from the French Canon de 155 mm GPF field gun.

== Development ==
The idea for the M12 was first proposed in 1941 and the pilot - T6 GMC - built and tested in early 1942. The Army Ground Forces initially rejected the design as unnecessary, but after the Artillery Board supported the Ordnance Department in asking for 50 units, 100 were authorized and built by March 1943. These vehicles were at first used for training.

== Description ==
The M12 was built on the chassis of the M3 Grant tank. The engine was moved forward to the center of the vehicle to allow room for the gun mount, and most vehicles used later M4-style bogies with trailing return rollers. The armored compartment at the front was occupied by the driver and commander. The gun crew were located in an open-topped area at the back of the vehicle. It mounted a 155 mm gun M1917, M1918 or M1918M1, depending upon availability, a weapon derived from the nearly identical French 155 mm GPF gun of World War I vintage. The main armament had a traverse of 14° and elevation limits of +30° to -5°. Limited storage space meant that only 10 155 mm projectiles and propellant charges could be carried on the vehicle.

An earth spade (similar to a bulldozer blade) at the rear was employed to absorb recoil. This layout (large gun mounted in an open mount at the rear, with a spade) was the pattern adopted for many years by other pieces of heavy self-propelled artillery.

=== Production ===
Only 100 vehicles were built: 60 in 1942 and a further 40 in 1943.

Production of M12
Month	M12
September 1942	1
October 1942	37
November 1942	12
December 1942	10
January 1943	16
February 1943	19
March 1943	5
Total	100

=== M30 cargo carrier ===
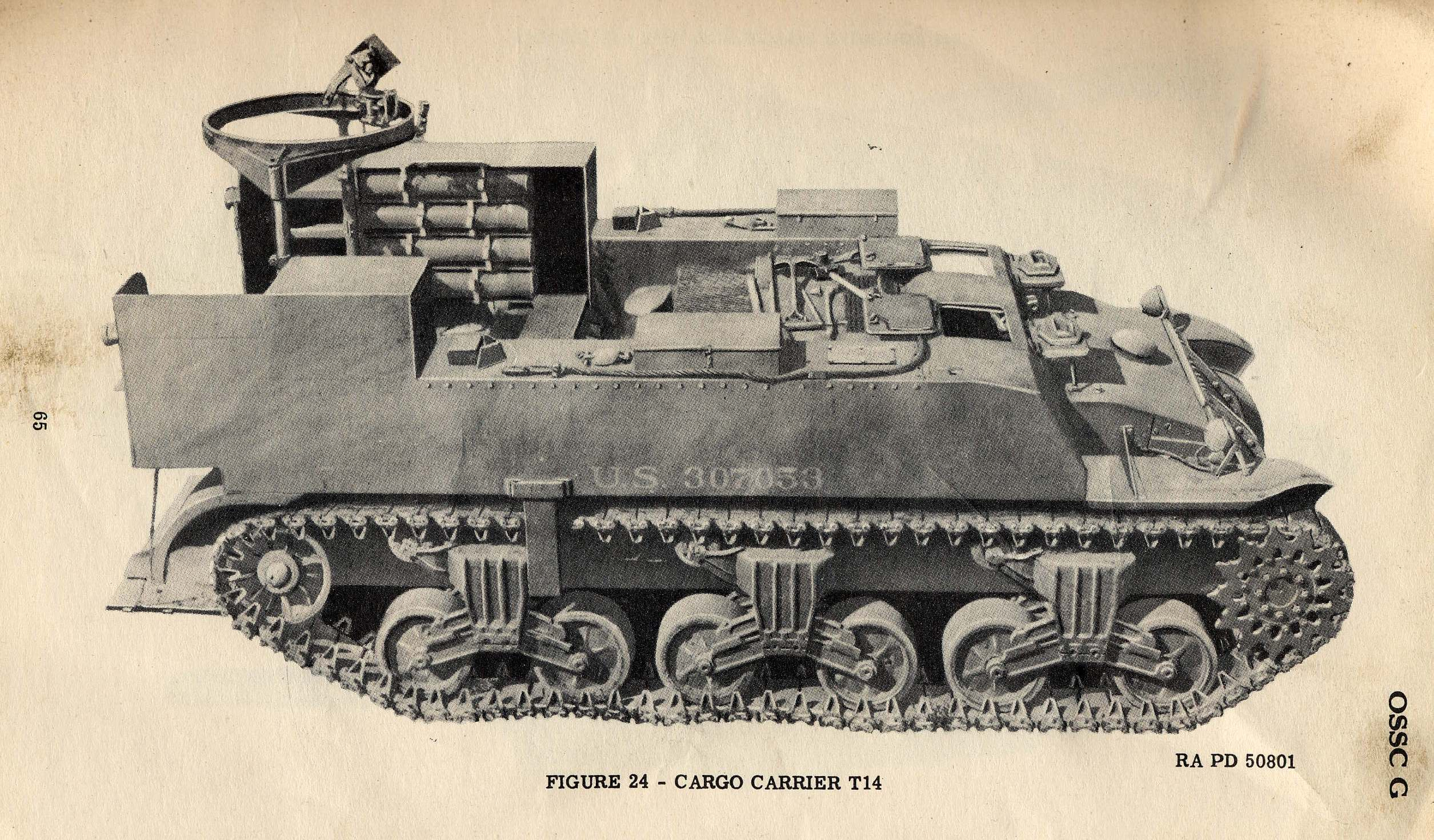
T14/M30 cargo carrier

Given the limited ammunition carried in the M12, a support vehicle based on the same chassis was produced as the cargo carrier M30 to transport the rest of the gun crew, battery stores, and ammunition. Identical to the M12 except for the gun and recoil spade, it could carry 40 rounds of 155 mm ammunition, and was armed with a .50-caliber (12.7 mm) M2 Browning machine gun in a ring mount for self-defense. In operational conditions, the M12 and M30 would serve in pairs.

== Use ==
During 1943, the vehicles were used for training or put into storage. From February to May 1944, before the invasion of France, 74 M12s were overhauled in preparation for combat operations overseas. They were assigned to seven armored field artillery battalions (the 174th, 258th, 557th, 558th, 987th, 989th, and 991st) and employed successfully throughout the campaign in North-West Europe.

Although designed primarily for indirect fire, during assaults on heavy fortifications, the M12s were sometimes employed in a direct-fire role, such as in the Allied assault on the Siegfried Line, where the M12 earned its nickname "Doorknocker" thanks to the 155mm cannon's ability to fire armour piercing rounds through seven feet of concrete at ranges up to 2,000 yards (1,830 meters). The vehicle was also dubbed "King Kong" by American operators due to the raw power of its gun.

In 1945, the M12 was complemented in Europe by the M40 gun motor carriage, designed on a late-war M4A3 Sherman chassis with the 155 mm gun M1 the successor to the 155mm M1918. Postwar, the M12 was retired from service and replaced by the M40.

== Surviving vehicle ==
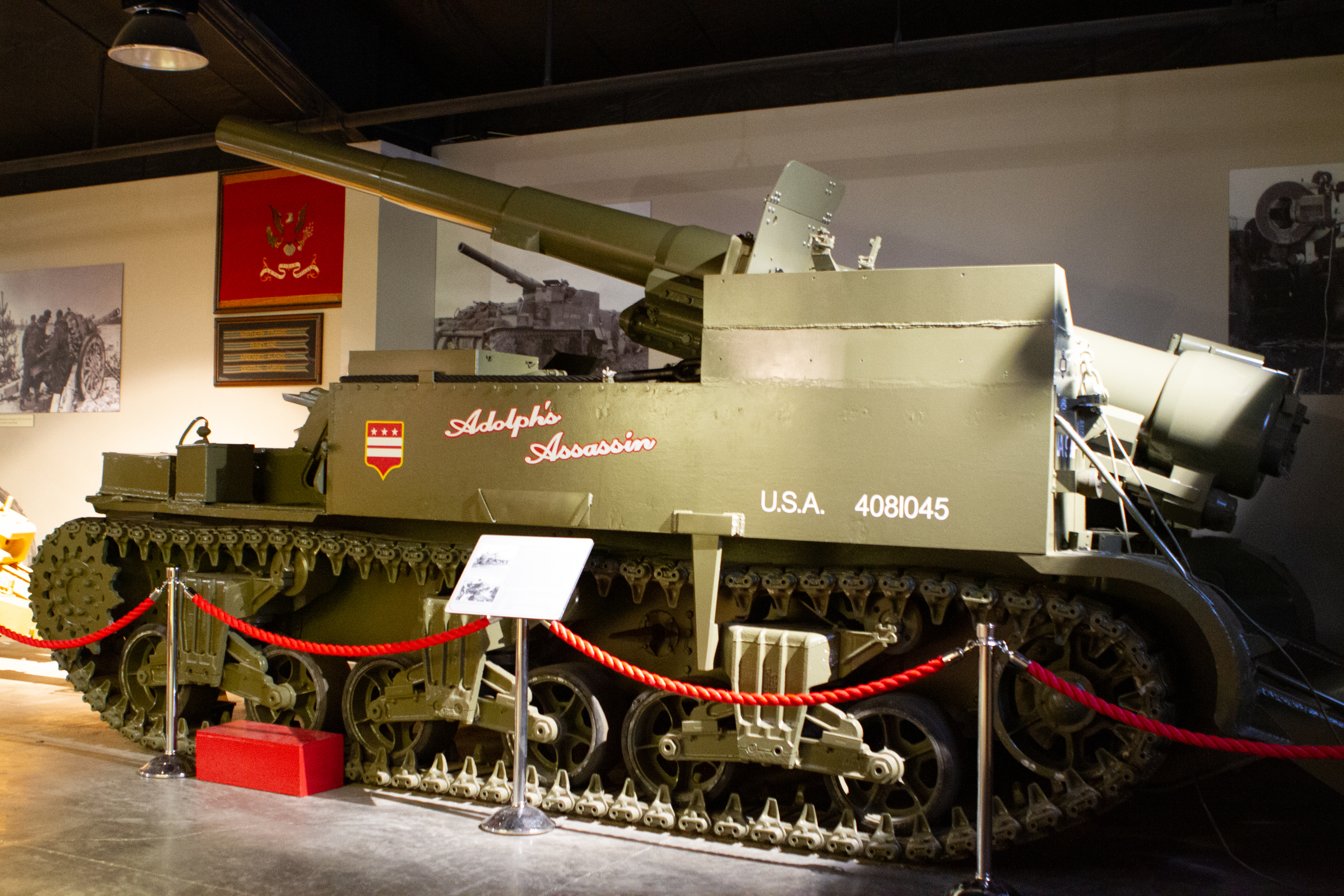
"Adolph's Assassin" on display at the U.S. Army Artillery Museum, Fort Sill, Oklahoma

The sole surviving M12 GMC is displayed at the Fort Sill museum in Oklahoma. It had previously been stored at the United States Army Ordnance Museum in Aberdeen, Maryland, United States, before being transferred to Fort Sill in November 2010.

== See also ==
- List of "M" series military vehicles
- G-numbers (G158)
