= Battle of Flanders =

The Battle of Flanders (French: Bataille des Flandres) is the name of several battles fought in Flanders during the First World War:

- First Battle of Flanders (19 October – 22 November 1914) - The First Battle of Ypres, a battle fought during the Race to the Sea
- Second Battle of Flanders (21 April – 25 May 1915) - The Second Battle of Ypres
- Third Battle of Flanders (11 July – 10 November 1917) - The Battle of Passchendaele/Third Battle of Ypres, an Anglo-French offensive
- Fourth Battle of Flanders (9–29 April 1918) - The Battle of the Lys/Operation Georgette, second part of the German spring offensive
- Fifth Battle of Flanders (28 September – 2 October 1918) - The Fifth Battle of Ypres, a Belgian-French-British offensive during the Hundred Days

From the Second World War:

- The German invasion of Belgium (1940) has also been called the Battle of Flanders.
