= United States Army Ordnance Training Support Facility =

Military museum in Fort Lee, Virginia, US

- Location within Virginia
- Former name: U.S. Army Ordnance Museum; U.S. Army Ordnance Training and Heritage Center
- Established: 1919
- Location: Fort Lee, Virginia
- Coordinates: 37.2440°N 77.3486°W
- Type: Military museum
- Website: history.army.mil/Army-Museum-Enterprise/Find-an-Army-Museum/US-Army-Ordnance-Training-Support-Facility

View of the inside of the facility from the entrance.

The United States Army Ordnance Training Support Facility (formerly known as the U.S. Army Ordnance Training and Heritage Center and U.S. Army Ordnance Museum) is a military museum with artifacts that are used to train and educate logistics soldiers. It re-located to Fort Lee, outside Petersburg, Virginia in 2009. Its previous incarnation was the United States Army Ordnance Museum at Aberdeen Proving Ground in Aberdeen, Maryland which closed in September 2010.

== History ==
The mission of the U.S. Army Ordnance Training and Heritage Center is to acquire, preserve, and exhibit historically significant equipment, armaments and materiel that relate to the history of the U.S. Army Ordnance Corps and to document and present the evolution and development of U.S. military ordnance material dating from the American Colonial Period to the present day.

Established in 1919 and officially opened to the public in 1924, to exhibit captured enemy equipment and materiel, the Museum was located in Building 314 of the Aberdeen Proving Ground and operated by the U.S. Army until 1967. Co-location with APG provided convenient access to the equipment being delivered to APG for testing after World War I. In 1965 local citizens formed the tax-free Ordnance Museum Foundation, Inc. to establish and operate a museum of these military artifacts. The Foundation is not affiliated with the U.S. Army nor the Department of Defense. The Foundation began operation of the Museum in the early 1970s, upon opening in Building 2601 on the Aberdeen Proving Ground (until its closure in September 2010) and operates the Ordnance Museum until this day.

In 2005 a Base Realignment and Closure (BRAC) law was passed by Congress. One of BRAC's requirements was the relocation of the U.S. Army Ordnance Center and School headquarters, the Ordnance Mechanical Maintenance School, and the Ordnance Museum to Fort Lee by the end of 2011. The transfer of artifacts from Aberdeen to Fort Lee began in August 2009.

=== Hours and entry requirements ===
The collection is used exclusively for training and not available for public viewing. Currently, only soldiers with an 89, 91, or 94 series MOS are authorized entry.. Open house dates during which the collection is open to the public are available periodically throughout the year, with the museum accessible to the public via entry to the public-facing museum enclave.

== Exhibits ==
Exterior exhibits at Fort Lee:

- M2 Bradley Fighting Vehicle
- 12-inch gun M1895 on railcar
- Pershing 1 Field Artillery Missile System
- 1939 Armored Recovery Vehicle
- T-12 Cloudmaker demolition bomb

== See also ==
- Kubinka Tank Museum – Russian Tank Museum
- Musée des Blindés – French Tank Museum
- The Tank Museum – United Kingdom Tank Museum
- Deutsches Panzermuseum – German Tank Museum
- Royal Museum of the Armed Forces and Military History – Belgian Tank Museum
- Base Borden Military Museum – Canadian Tank Museum
- American Heritage Museum – private American tank museum
