= Chemical Warfare Service: Flame Tank Group Seabees =

US WWII unit turning tanks into flamethrowers

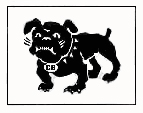
The 117th Naval Construction Battalion insignia of the Seabees with the Flame Tank Group.

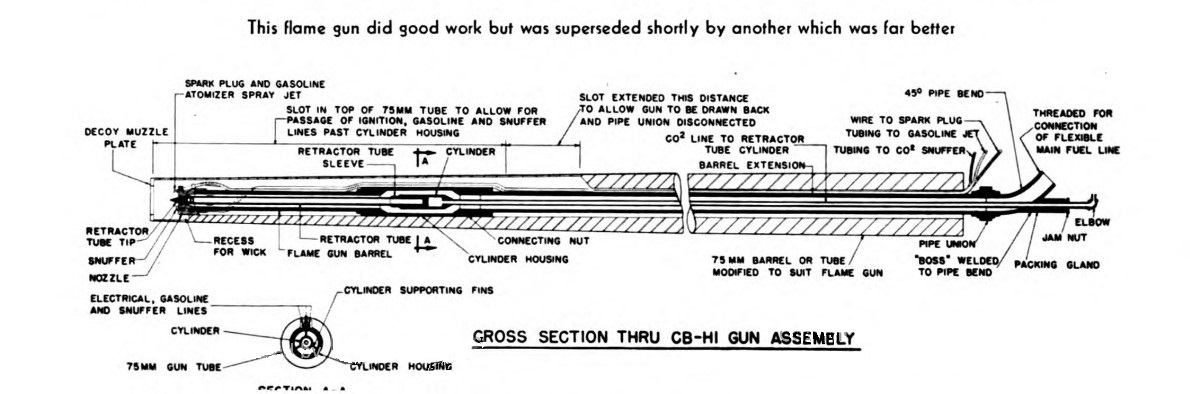
Cross section through a CB-H1 flame thrower

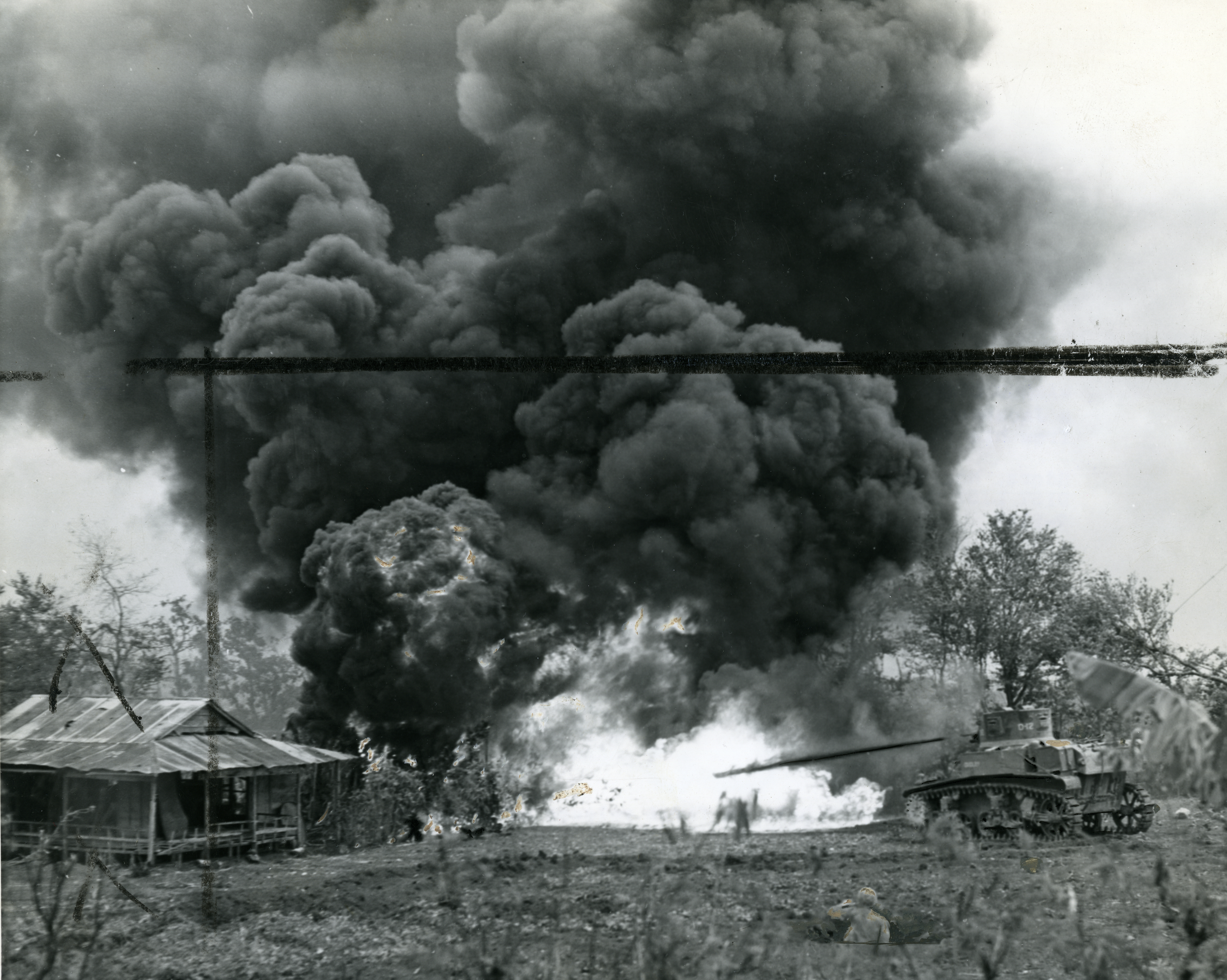
Marines use a "Satan" to incinerate a Japanese pillbox on Saipan.

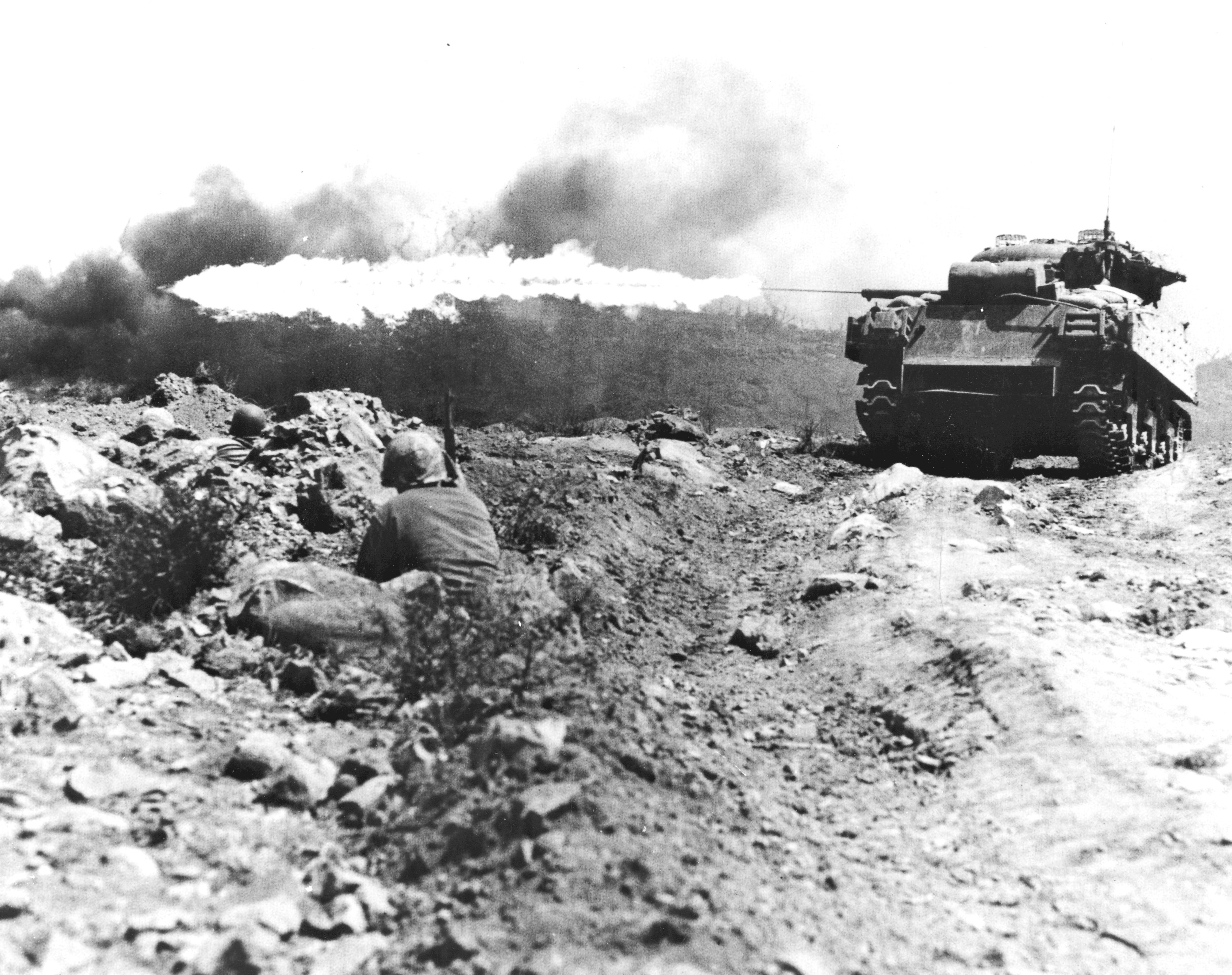
The CWS-POA-H1-H2 Shermans used on Iwo Jima had a flame throwing range of 150 yards

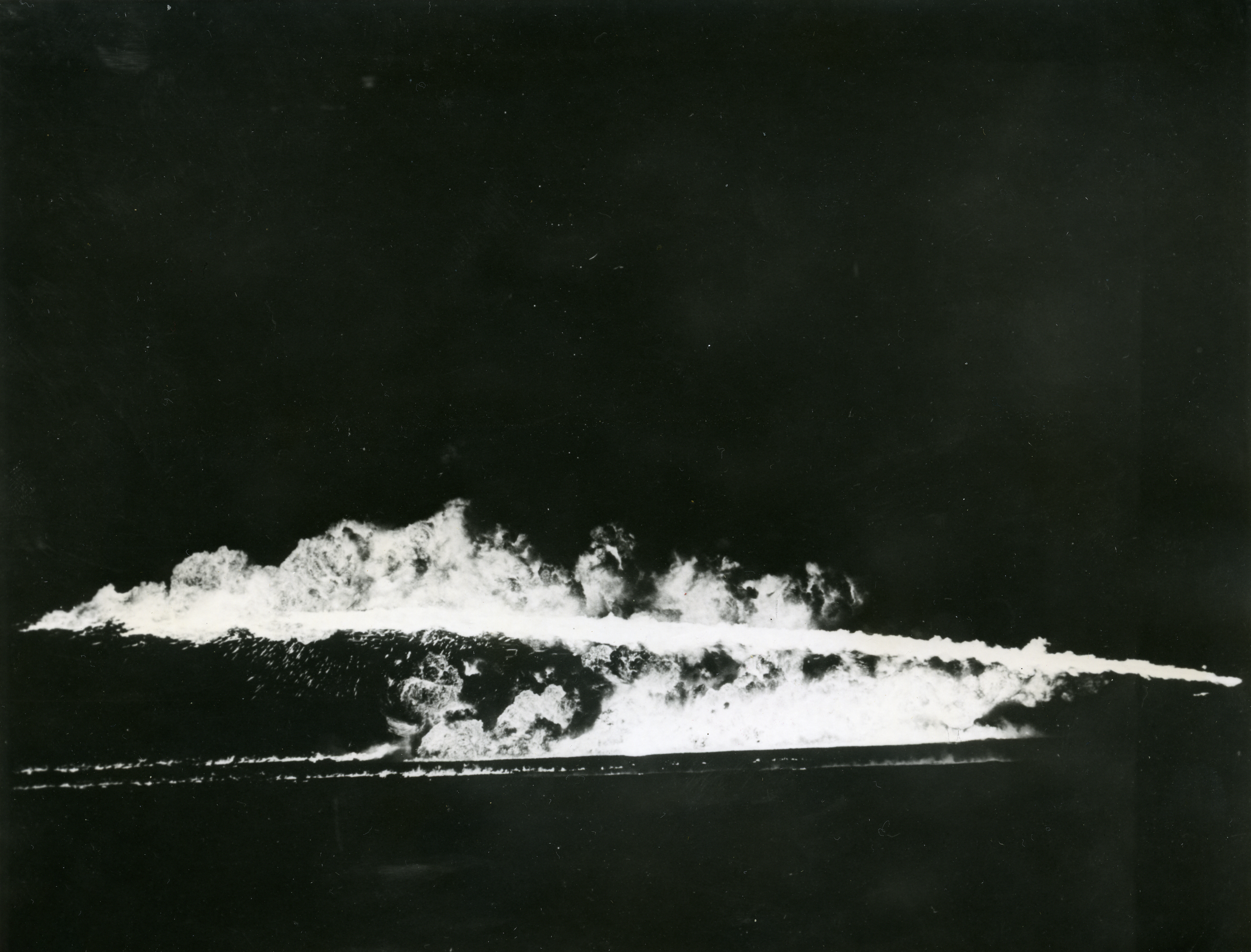
Night demonstration at Schofield Barracks 3 weeks prior to Iwo Jima.

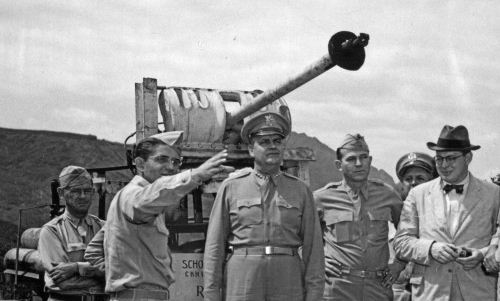
The Seabees' training model of a coaxial H1a-H5a flamethrower shown by Col Unmacht's staff to visitors would not see combat until Korea

Upon the outbreak of the Second World War, the United States had no mechanized flamethrowing capability. It is believed that an officer in the U.S. Army's 754th Tank Battalion came up with the idea of mounting a flame thrower on a M3 Light tank on the island of New Caledonia. The Army used the idea on New Georgia and likewise the Marines during the Battle of Bougainville, after which further development passed to the Army Chemical Warfare Service at Schofield Barracks, Territory of Hawaii. There the Army reached out to the United States Naval Construction Force for assistance. The Seabees accepted the request and converted or modified nearly 400 tanks for the Army. These weapons set the standard for the U.S. through the Korean War. It was not until 1955 that a superior flame throwing tank replaced the Shermans the Seabees modified.

== World War II ==
During WWII Seabees of the 117th U.S. Naval Construction Battalion modified/created the main armament flame throwing tanks that were used in the Pacific theater by the USMC in the battles of Saipan, Tinian, and Iwo Jima; and the U.S. Army on Okinawa. They were a weapon Japanese troops feared and the Marine Corps said was the best weapon they had in the taking of Iwo Jima. After Okinawa the Army stated that the tanks had a psychological presence on the battlefield. U.S. troops preferred to follow them over standard armor for the fear they put in the enemy. The U.S. Army credits them with saving American lives.

Pacific field commanders had tried field modified mechanized flame throwers early on, with the Marine Corps deciding to leave further development to the Army. The Navy had an interest in flame throwing and five Navy Mark I flamethrowers arrived in Hawaii in April 1944. The Navy deemed them "unsuitable" due to their weight and turned them over to the Army's Chemical Warfare Service. In May a top secret composite unit was assembled at Schofield Barracks. It was led by Colonel Unmacht of the US Army Chemical Warfare Service, Central Pacific Area (CENPAC) Col. Unmacht began the project with only the 43rd Chemical Laboratory Company. They modified the first light tank designating it a "Satan". The flame tank group was expanded with men from the 5th Marine tank battalion and 25 from the 117th CB. The newly attached Seabees went over what the Army had created and concluded it was a little over engineered. They recommended reducing the number of moving parts from over a hundred to a half dozen.

V Amphibious Corps (VAC) wanted mechanized flamethrowing capabilities for the Marianas operations. VAC had ordered and received two shipments of Canadian Ronson F.U.L. Mk IV flamethrowers (30 flamethrowers in total) to field modify tanks. With a war to wage, field modification was much quicker than going through official military procurement channels. The 117th CB was assigned to the upcoming Saipan operation. Col Unmacht worked out an arrangement to not only keep the 117th Seabees he had, but get more. Augmented by the additional Seabees, the group worked sun up to sundown and, with Seabee can-do twenty-four M3s were modified to start the campaign. The very first, made by the 43rd Co, was christened "Hells Afire". The installation configuration of the flamethrower components limited the turret's traverse to 180°. As Satans were produced Colonel Unmacht had the Seabees conduct a comprehensive series of 40-hour classes on flame tank operation with first and second echelon maintenance. First, for officers and enlisted of the Marine Corps and then later for the Army. The Satans had a range of 40–80 yd (37–73 m) and were the first tanks to have the main armament swapped for flame throwers. They were divided between the 2nd and 4th Marine Divisions for Saipan and Tinian with Tinian being more favorable to their use.

- Four Seabees received Navy/Marine Corps commendations for their work from Lt. Gen. Holland M. Smith Commanding General(USMC) FMF Pacific.
- At least 7 were awarded the Bronze Star.

Mid-September the Army decided to officially form a CWS "Flame Thrower Group" with Col Unmacht requesting 56 additional Seabees. The group included more Army CWS and 81st Ordnance men as well. It was apparent that a larger flamethrower on a bigger tank would be more desirable, but very few tanks were available for conversion. Operation Detachment was next and Col Unmacht's group located eight M4A3 Sherman medium tanks for it. The Seabees worked to combine the best elements from three different flame units: the Ronson, the Navy model I and those Navy Mk-1s the Navy gave up. MMS1c A.A. Reiche and EM2c Joseph Kissel are credited with designing the CB-H1. Installation required 150 lbs of welding rod, 1100 electrical connections, and cost between $20,000-25,000 per tank(adj. for inflation $288,000-$360,000 in 2019). The CB-H1 flamethrower operated on 300 psi, which gave it a range of 400 ft (120 m) -12 to +25° with a transverse 270°. This model was quickly superseded by the CB-H2 which was far better, 150 yds. EM2c Kissel and SF1c J.T. Patterson accompanied the tanks to oversee maintenance during the battle of Iwo Jima. Kissel filled in as an assistant driver/gunner with tank crews on 20 days of the operation.

In November 1944, prior to the rave USMC reviews of Iwo Jima, the Fleet Marine Force had requested 54 mechanized flame throwers, nine for each of the Marine Corps divisions On Iwo the tanks all landed on D-day and went into action on D+2, sparingly at first. As the battle progressed, portable flame units sustained casualty rates up to 92%, leaving few troops trained to use the weapon. More and more calls came for the Mark-1s to the point that the Marines became dependent upon the tanks and would hold up their assault until a flame tank was available. Each tank battalion had four, two to A Co and two to C Co in both battalions. One of the 4th Division tanks had a 50 cal. machine gun coaxial to the flamethrower as well as 4 in (100 mm) concrete armor to counter placement of magnetic charges. Towards the end of the battle, 5th Marine tanks used between 5,000 to 10,000 US gal (19,000 to 38,000 L) gallons per day. On several day they requested tanks from the 4th tankers. Late in the battle the 4th loaned a single to the 3rd tank battalion. When the battle was over the Marines credited the flame tanks as the single best weapon they had. The eight flame tank crews received Presidential Unit Citations with their respective tank battalions.

For Okinawa the 10th Army decided that the entire 713th Tank Battalion would provisionally convert to flame. The battalion was tasked to support both the Army and the Marine Corps assault. It was ordered to Schofield Barracks on 10 Nov. There the Seabees supervised three officers and 60 enlisted of the 713th convert all 54 of their tanks to Ronsons. The Ronsons did not have the range of either the CB-H1 or CB-H2. The 10th Army had 170 Shermans with periscope flamethrowers on hand for Okinawa. However, the CWS "Hawaiian-produced main armament flame throwers were preferred for their large fuel capacity and greater range". The M4s with periscope mounts saw little use. The 713th minus B Company received the Presidential Unit Citation (Army) for its actions on Okinawa. B Company received two Presidential Unit Citations (Navy), one for 1st platoon and the other to 2nd and 3rd platoons for actions with the 1st and 6th Marine Divisions.

In June 1945, the 43rd Chemical Lab. Co. had developed a stabilized flamethrower fuel (napalm). They oversaw CB construction of an activating plant that produced over 250,000 gallons. The 713th went through 200,000 gallons on Okinawa. Also in June, the Army cancelled all further production orders for any more M4 Shermans. This caused Under Secretary of War Robert P. Patterson to place an expedite on Col. Unmacht's production of flame tanks. They were given a "Triple A" procurement priority, the same given to the Boeing B-29 Superfortress bomber and the Atomic bomb projects.

Another 72 tanks were ordered by the Marine Corps for the planned invasion of Japan of which Col. Unmacht's crews had 70 ready by Victory over Japan Day. In total Unmacht's Flame Tank Group Seabees produced 354 tanks.

The military did not have uniform terminology for referencing mechanized flamethrowers until after VE Day, so there is some wording variation in documents. The Seabees produced 11 different models of flame throwing tanks off three basic variations identified with a POA-CWS-H number

"Primary" where the main armament was removed and replaced.

- The first eight had Navy CB-H1 or CB-H2 flamethrowers. US Army Chemical Corps variously identified these tanks as POA-CWS-H1, (Pacific Ocean Area-Chemical Warfare Section-Hawaii) CWS-POA-H2, CWS-POA-H1 H2, OR CWS-"75"-H1 H2 mechanized flamethrowers. US Marine and US Army observer documents from Iwo Jima refer to them as the CB-Mk-1 or CB-H1. Marines on the lines simply called them the Mark I. Enclosure (F) to Appendix 4 to Annex DOG to Operation Report Iwo Jima, under Miscollaneous Ordnance Equipment, they are listed "Tanks, Flame Thrower, CB-H1". The Japanese referred to them as M1 tanks and it is speculated that they did so due to a poor translation of "MH-1".

The next 54 tanks had Ronson flamethrowers. That made them the third tank variant produced. Army records identify them as POA-CWS-H1s.

Some of these tanks were configured with an external 400-foot (120 m) long hose supplying a M2-2 portable flamethrower that ground troops could use. This variation could throw 40 yd (37 m) on terrain with up to a 45° slope. A drawback to this attachment was all the fuel it took to charge the hose line so it could fire, diminished the tank's overall effectiveness. Army documents post-war refer to this variation as being a CWS-POA-H1.

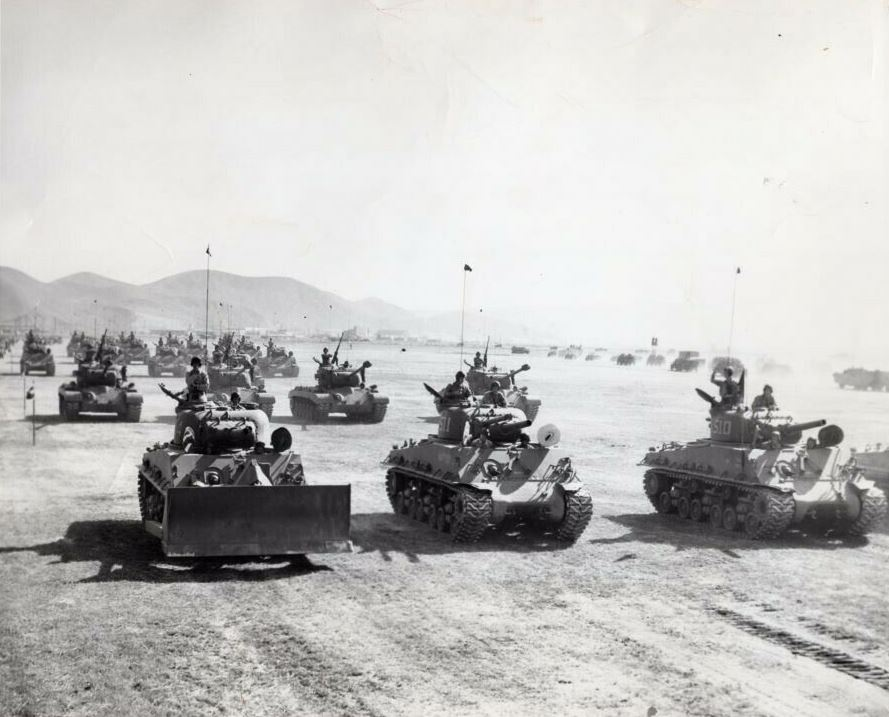
1st Marine Tank Battalion parade at Camp Pendleton on 6 May 1949. POA-CWS-H5 flamethrower center.

"Auxiliary" where the flame thrower was mounted coaxial to the main armament. Eighteen of the first generation model were on the way to the 10th Army on Okinawa, but the island was taken before they arrived, so they were given to the 3rd Marine tank battalion on Guam.

- 75mm main armament with Ronson
- 75mm main armament with H1-H5a
- 105mm main armament with Ronson
- 105mm main armament with H1a-H5a USMC designation M4A3E8.

The tanks produced in Hawaii all used bottled CO_{2} as the propellent that was discharged at 300 psi. The majority of H5 tanks were M4A3(105)HVSS Shermans. It was this type the Marine Corps had at Inchon in 1950. In mid-1945 the Seabees started producing the second generation of these tanks. All H5a Shermans, with either 75mm or 105mm main armaments, were referred to as CWS-POA-5s.

"Periscope Mount" This model was based upon work done by the U.S. Army at Fort Knox. The flame thrower was mounted through the assistant driver's hatch alongside their tank periscope which meant that the bow machine gun could be retained. 176 were produced. Word spread that one of these tanks lost a crew when the flamethrower nozzle took a hit. The Marine Corps did not want this design.

H1 periscope

H1A periscope

H1B periscope

Examples labeled POA-CWS-H1 and POA-CWS-H5 are on display at the Mahaffey Museum at Fort Leonard Wood Missouri.

5th Marine CB-H1 in action on D+22,

Example M42B1E9

The Marines preferred the CB tanks to any produced in the U.S. at that time. The Marine Corps and Army both felt that the flame throwing tanks saved U.S. troops lives and kept the casualty numbers lower than they would have been had the tanks not been used. They also agreed that they would need many for the invasion of the Japanese homeland.

- WWII Naval Construction Battalion Logos
- Col. Unmacht 1946 Military Review flame tank article.

== Korea ==
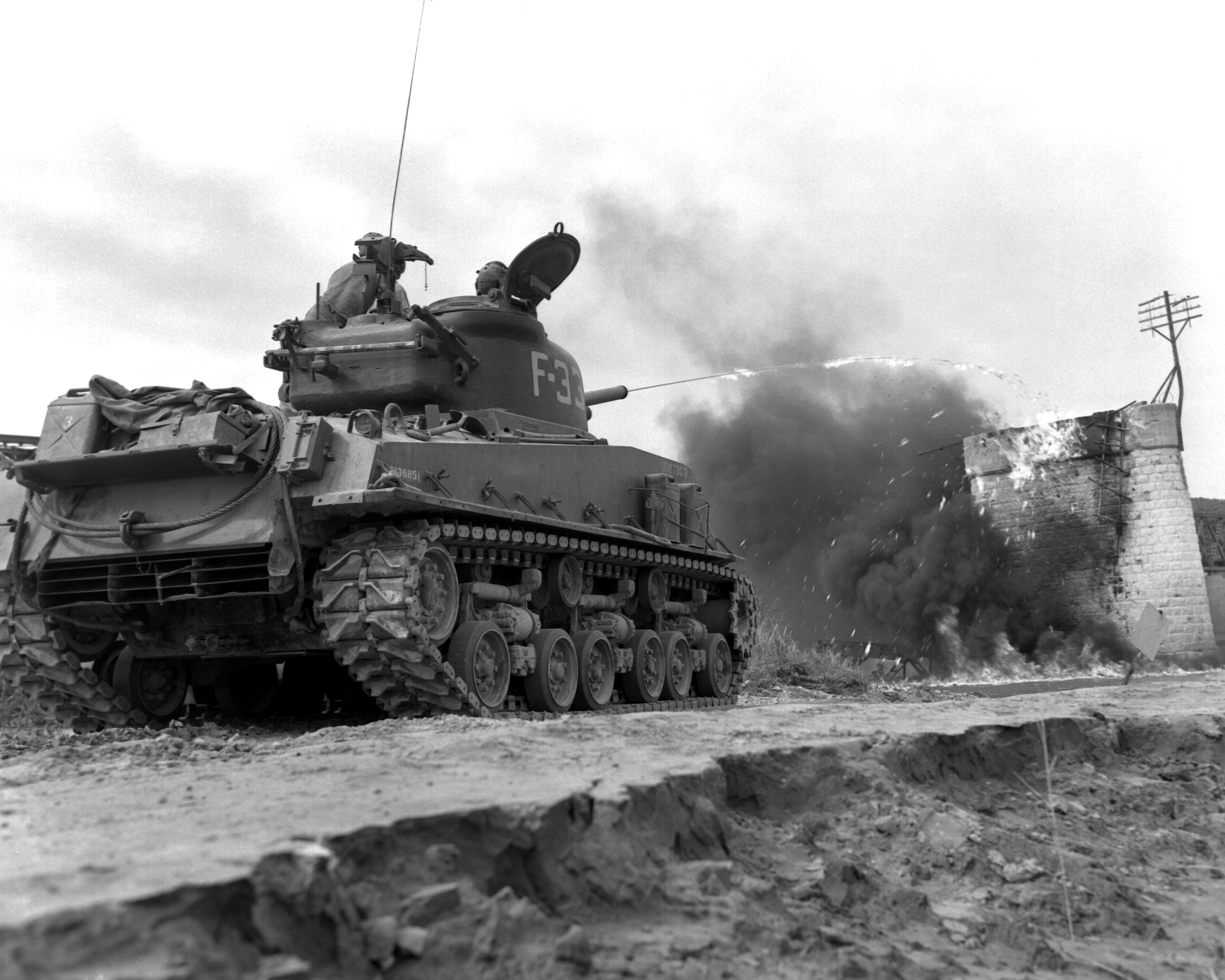
A USMC M4A3R8 Sherman produced by the Flame Tank Group Seabees, in action in Korea. The tank number F-33 stands for: Flame tank 3rd squad 3rd tank.

Postwar the Army stood down the provisional 713th keeping few flame tanks. When the Korean War broke out the Marine Corps put together nine CWS-POA-H5s from Pendelton and Hawaii out of the 26 flame tanks it had received during WWII. Together they formed a platoon, named the "Flame Dragons" attached to HQ 1st tank battalion. They landed at Inchon in 1950 and were the only U.S. mechanized flame unit to be in Korea. These tanks would first see combat on 15 September 1950 landing in the second wave on Wo-mido Island. From there they would advance and participate in the First Battle of Seoul. The Seabees work was outdated when upgraded flamethrowers were mounted in M67s in 1955.

== See also ==
- 1st Tank Battalion
- 3rd Tank Battalion
- 4th Marine Tank Battalion
- M4 Sherman variants
