= Flame tank =

Armored vehicle equipped with a flamethrower

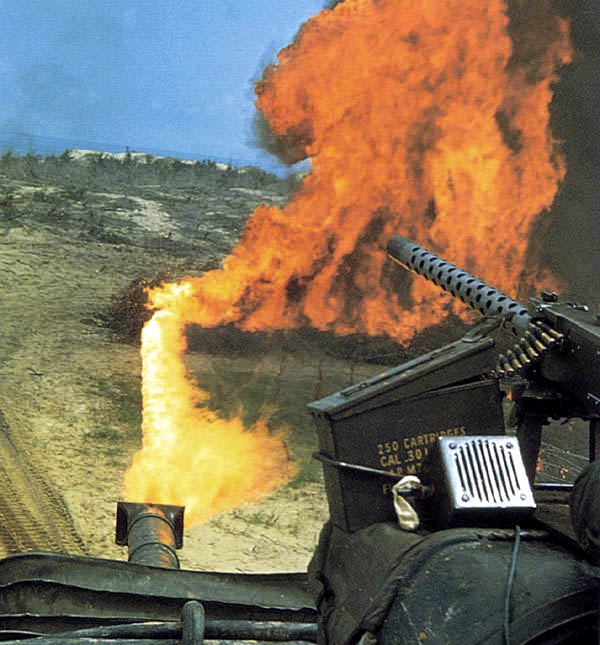
A USMC M67 flame thrower tank in South Vietnam, 1968. An M1919 Browning machine gun is mounted to the right.

A flame tank is a type of tank equipped with a flamethrower, most commonly used to supplement combined arms attacks against fortifications, confined spaces, or other obstacles. The type only reached significant use in the Second World War, during which the United States, Nazi Germany, Soviet Union, Italy, Japan, and the United Kingdom all produced flamethrower-equipped tanks.

A number of production methods were used. The flamethrowers used were either modified versions of existing infantry flame weapons (Flammpanzer I and II) or specially designed (Flammpanzer III). They were mounted externally (Flammpanzer II), replaced existing machine gun mounts, or replaced the tank's main armament (Flammpanzer III). Fuel for the flame weapon was either carried inside the tank, in armoured external storage, or in some cases in a special trailer behind the tank (Churchill Crocodile).

== Combat effectiveness ==
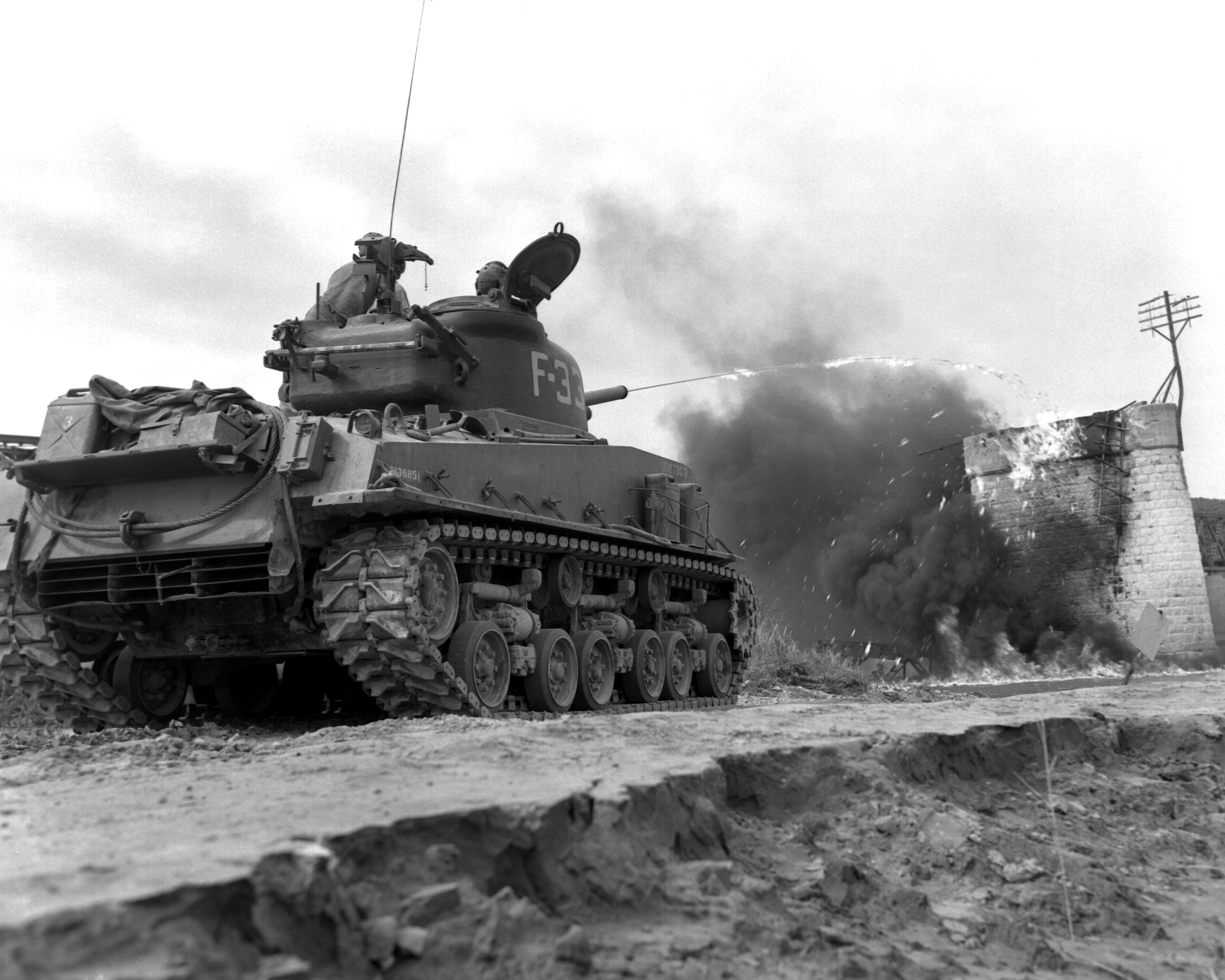
An M4A3R3 variant of the Sherman tank on exercise in Korea

In comparison to man-portable flamethrowers, flame tanks carried much more fuel, and could fire longer-ranged bursts. Due to their ability to get in range of enemy positions in comparative safety, they were invaluable for rooting out heavy infantry fortifications. For example, as the main guns of US tanks were largely unsuccessful in penetrating the thick bunkers created by the Japanese defenders on islands such as Tarawa or Iwo Jima, flame throwing tanks were used instead while infantrymen provided the necessary security during their deployment. On Iwo Jima the marines learned that conventional firearms were relatively ineffective against the Japanese defenders and effectively used flamethrowers and grenades to flush out Japanese troops in the tunnels. One of the technological innovations of the battle, the eight Sherman M4A3R3 medium tanks equipped with flamethrowers ("Ronson" or "Zippo" tanks), proved very effective at clearing Japanese positions. The Shermans were difficult to disable, such that defenders were often compelled to assault them in the open, where they would face the full firepower of marine rifle and machine gun fire.

The maximum range of a flamethrower was typically less than 150 metres. Because of this limitation, the flamethrower was virtually useless on an open battlefield. However, they proved a potent psychological weapon against fortified troops. In many instances, troops surrendered or fled upon seeing a flame tank fire ranging shots, rather than risk being burned alive.

Experience of combat use of flamethrower tanks was mixed. German flamethrower variants of the Panzer II and Panzer III were both discontinued due to unsatisfactory performance and converted into assault guns or tank destroyers. The Panzer IV was never converted into a flame variant, despite having been configured for many other roles.

The mixed results were in part due to the development of infantry anti-tank weapons. At the start of the Second World War most infantry units had weapons with some effectiveness against armoured targets at ranges of thirty to fifty meters, like anti-tank rifles. Towards the end of the war, more powerful anti-tank weapons such as the bazooka, Panzerschreck, and PIAT were introduced which were fatal to tanks at ranges longer than the tank's flamethrower could reach.

British Churchill Crocodiles supported the U.S. Army in the summer of 1944 during the fight over the Normandy hedgerows or the "Bocage country" and used a squadron during the fighting at the Battle for Brest, notably aiding in the defeat of a Fallschirmjäger garrison at the siege of Montbarey fortress on 16 September 1944. The US Army received a smaller American designed flamethrower mounted upon the M4 Sherman tank during the same month of September 1944, assigned to the US Army's 70th Tank Battalion, the flamethrowing tanks went into action on 18 September 1944, where it was found that the weapons had a very short range as compared to the British Crocodiles, and consequently were not very popular amongst US troops.

The Canadian and Dutch armies became two of the most active users of the Wasp variant of the universal carrier equipped with a flamethrower. While fighting in Europe, the Wasp was found to be extremely effective in prying German soldiers from their defenses. Indeed, the mechanical flamethrowers, although not impressive by themselves, struck horror into the minds of German troops, who feared them more than any other conventional weapon. Canadian troops used them during the Battle of the Scheldt.

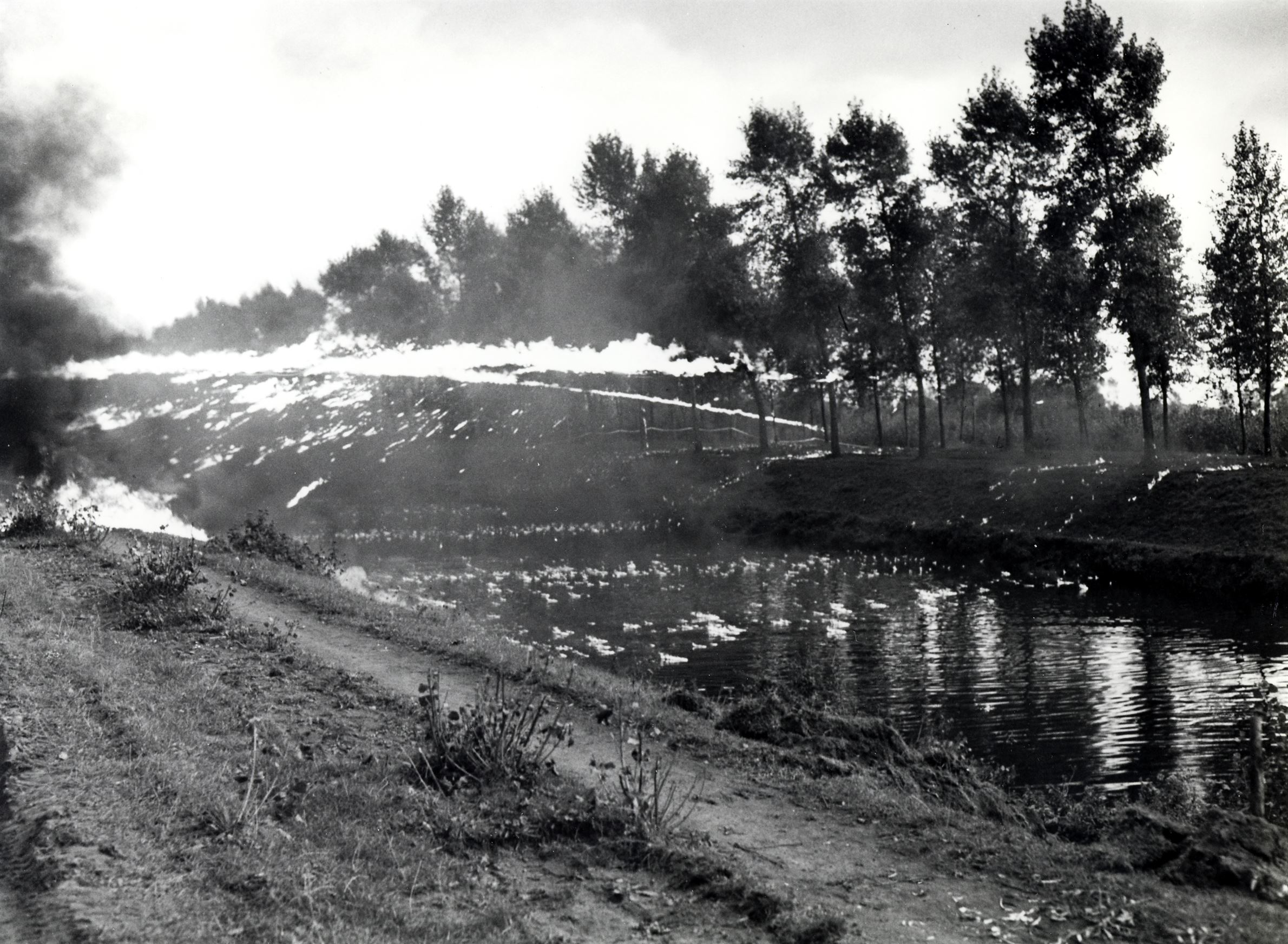
Members of the Canadian 4th Armoured Division demonstrating the use of flame throwers across a canal, Maldegem, October 1944.

In contrast to man-portable flamethrowers that were vulnerable to bullets and shrapnel, making them extremely dangerous to their operators, flame tanks were extremely difficult to catch on fire or explode unless hit with an armor piercing round or explosive reaching the ammunition and engine fuel inside the tank's main hull. Tanks such as the Churchill Crocodile, which towed the flamethrower liquid container behind the actual tank, held no greater risk of fire than standard tanks. Although the towed container itself could be easily targeted, the tank and its crew remained well protected. The armored trailer and armored coupling of the Churchill Crocodile could be jettisoned from inside the tank if necessary.

Crews of flame tanks were not necessarily more vulnerable than those in the standard version of the tank (a Churchill Crocodile flame tank being more or less as vulnerable to anti-tank weapons as the standard Churchill), but the crews of flamethrowing tanks were allegedly treated differently should they be captured alive. Due to the perceived inhumanity of the weapon itself, captured crews of such tanks were allegedly treated much less humanely than crews of regular tanks. The allies suspected that there were instances where flametankers were executed by German troops upon capture, and although some published sources claim this was a fact, but not a single specific instance is known to have been documented. Nevertheless, British tank crews received sixpence a day extra "danger money" due to the threat of arbitrary execution. Flame tanks also suffered from the fact, along with flamethrower-armed troops, that all enemy within range would usually fire on them due to the fear of the weapon.

== World War I ==
Some vehicles equipped with flamethrowers were trialed by various nations during World War I, although none were used in combat. Some examples include the Steam Tank and General Jackson's Pedrail prototype.

The first working tracked passenger war vehicle, the first modern tank was made in Hungary by inventor Pál Lipták in 1913, as a specialization of the war tractors of the era. It had a built-in, rotating turret for its cannon and a flamethrower was also added at one point. The first test firings were held in 1915, but the military scrapped the idea, worried that the rivets would not withstand a major hit.

== Interwar period ==
The successes of the Soviet defense industry, in the late 1920s, made it possible to begin the motorization and mechanization of the Soviet Armed Forces.

In 1932, the Revolutionary Military Council of the USSR adopted a resolution "On giving the mechanized brigade chemical and other means to fight the enemy's entrenched infantry", thereby setting the direction for the design of chemical tanks (flamethrowers were issued to chemical troops). The T-26 tank was chosen as the basis for the chemical tank, which was put into mass production in the USSR in 1931. This armored vehicle, for that period of time, was distinguished by good performance, surpassing foreign tanks in terms of armor and driving performance. The task for the development of a chemical combat vehicle (BKhM-3 / KhT-26) was assigned to the Military Chemical Directorate (VOKHIMU) of the Red Army, in turn, VOKHIM, entrusted this work to KB-2 of plant No. 174 in Leningrad and the design bureau of the Kompressor plant (chemical equipment). BKhM-3, in addition to the flamethrower, was equipped with smoke launchers and toxic sprays, so these tanks were called not flamethrower, but "chemical".

The first combat-ready flamethrower tanks appeared in the early 1930s: KhT-27, KhT-26 and a number of others - in the USSR, CV3 LF - in Italy. Before the start of World War II more than 1,300 flamethrower tanks of various types were produced by Soviet industry.

By the mid-1930s, the first combat use of flamethrower tanks took place. Italy used its flamethrower tanks in the Second Italo-Ethiopian War of 1935-1936, and the CV3 LF was also used by the Italian Expeditionary Force during the Spanish Civil War. Soviet troops first used flamethrower tanks against the Japanese at Khasan in 1938 and later a Khalkhin Gol in 1939.

In 1931 the São Paulo Public Force created an assault car section. The first vehicle to be incorporated was a flame tank built from a Caterpillar Twenty Two Tractor. The vehicle was developed by lieutenant Reynaldo Ramos de Saldanha da Gama, with help from the Polytechnic school. It was built from riveted steel plates, with a rotating flamethrower turret, and four 7mm Hotchkiss machineguns mounted on the hull. The Flamethrowers' effective range was a hundred meters. The tank was used in combat during the Constitutionalist Revolution, routing federal troops from a bridge in an engagement at Cruzeiro.

During the battle of Kilometer 7 to Saavedra in the Chaco War, Major Walther Kohn rode in a flamethrower equipped tankette; due to heat he exited the tank to fight on foot and was killed in combat.

== World War II Axis ==
=== German Army ===
- Flammpanzer I a field variant of the German Panzer I used briefly during the war in North Africa
- Panzer II Flamm, a variant of the German Panzer II Ausf D/E
- Flammpanzer 38, a variant of the Jagdpanzer 38(t) tank destroyer
- Panzerkampfwagen B2 (F), a variant produced by the Germans based on captured French Char B1 tank chassis
- Flammpanzer III Ausf. M/Panzer III (Fl), a variant of the German Panzer III Ausf. M
- Sd.Kfz. 251/16 Flammpanzerwagen, not actually a tank but a Sd.Kfz. 251 series half-track
- StuG III (Flamm), a variant based on a variety of pre-Ausf F StuG III assault gun chassis

=== Italian Royal Army ===
- L3 Lf flame tank, a variant of the L3/35 tankette
- L6 Lf flame tank, a variant of the L6/40 light tank

=== Imperial Japanese Army ===
- Japanese Army Sōkō Sagyō Ki armoured engineer vehicle models Bo, Ko, Otsu, Hei, Tei
- Flame tank model of Type 95 Ha-Go tank

== World War II Allied ==
=== Light tank M3 ("Stuart") ===
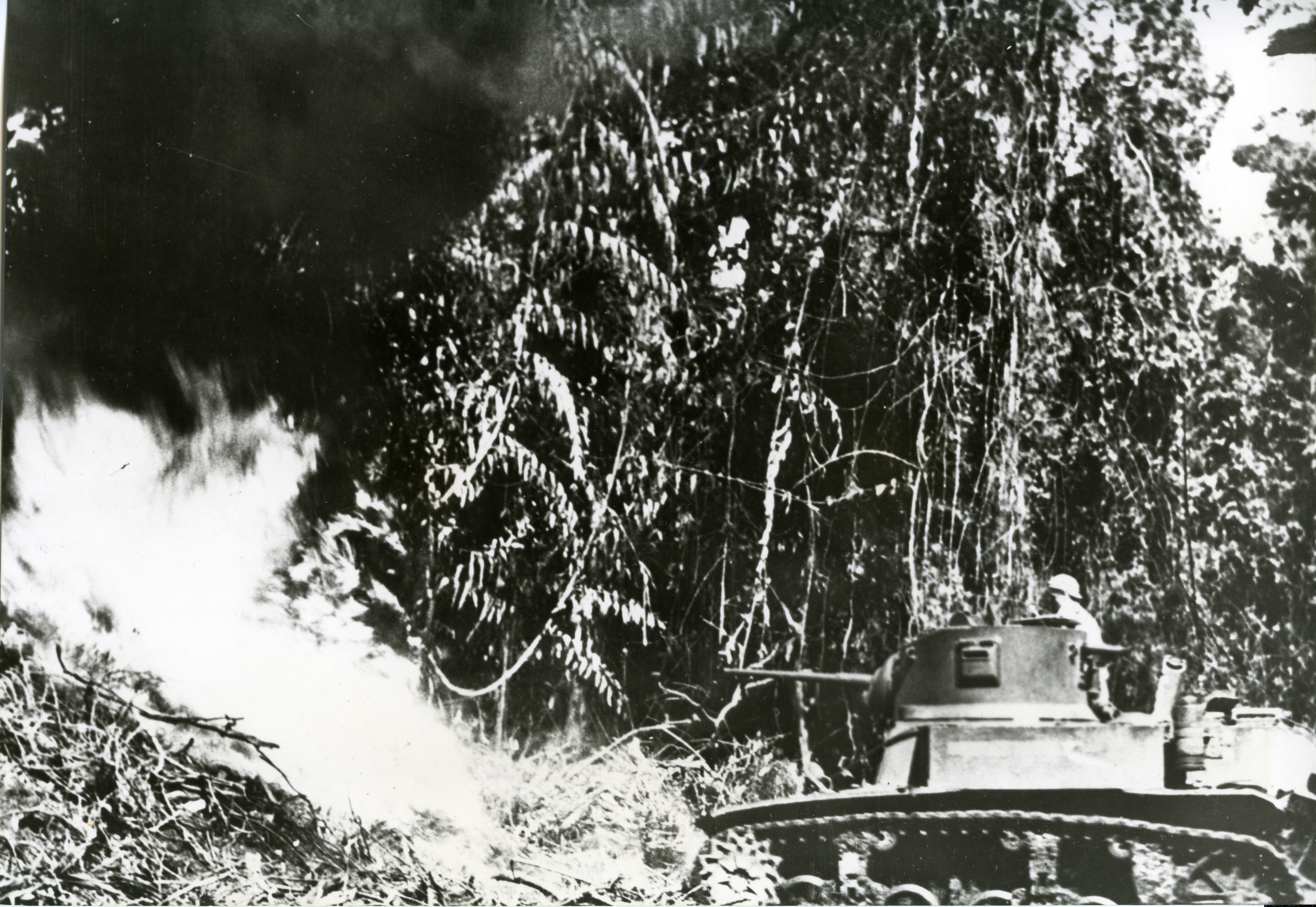
An M3 Stuart, fitted with a flamethrower, attacks a Japanese bunker during the Bougainville Campaign (April 1944)

- M3 Satan: Modified conversion of M3 light tank with Canadian "Ronson" replacing main armament

=== Medium tank M4 ("Sherman") ===
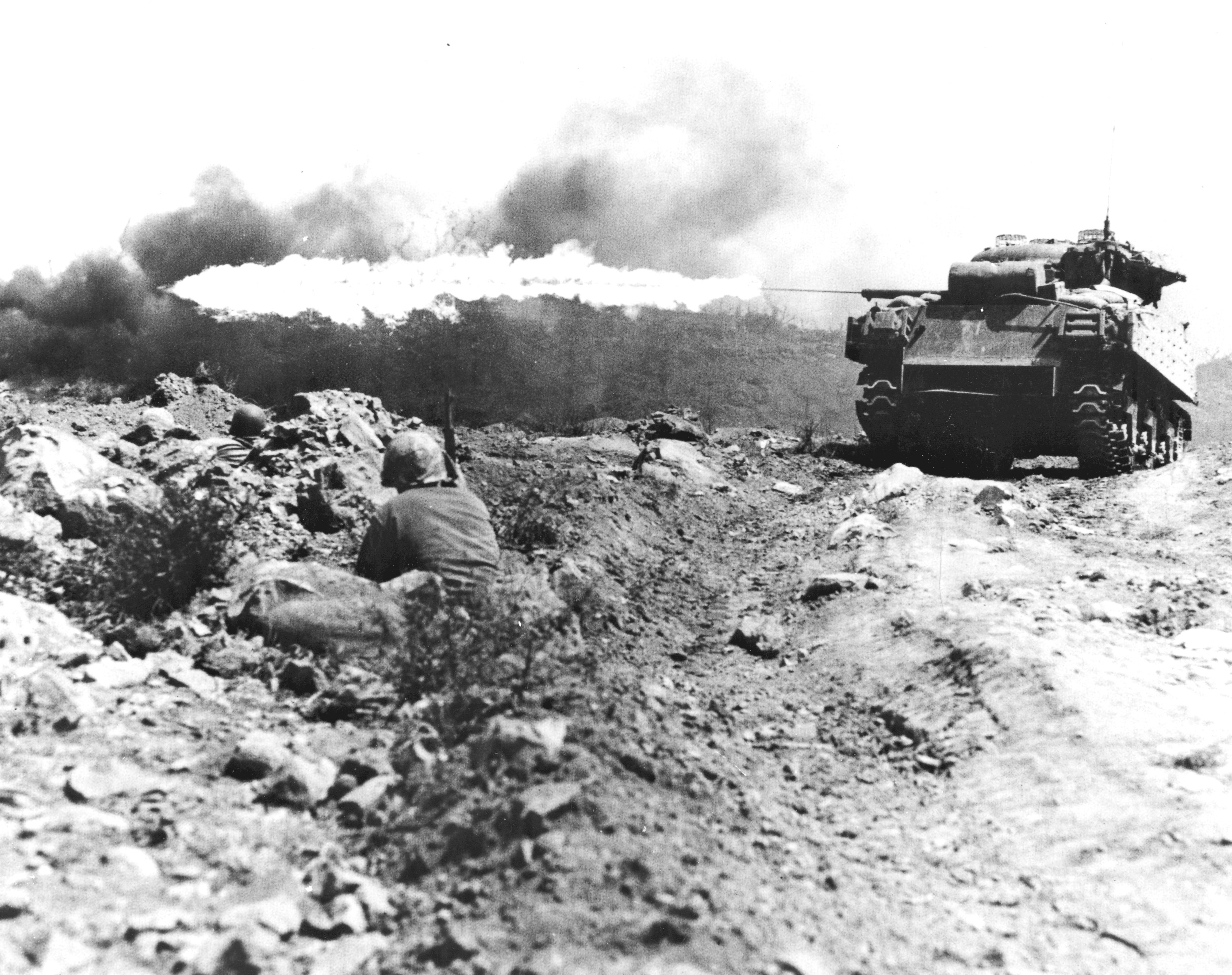
An M4A3R5 USMC tank during the Battle of Iwo Jima (March 1945)

- M4 A2 with bow mounted E4-5 flamethrowers
- U.S.Army CWS-POA-H1 and H2 USMC M4A3R5 Mark-1
- U.S.Army CWS-POA-H5 USMC M4A3R8 with coaxial H1A-5A flamethrower
- U.S.Army M42-B1E9
- M4 Crocodile: four M4 tanks converted by British for US 2nd Armored Division in NW Europe with the same armoured fuel trailer as used on the Churchill Crocodile but the fuel line went over the hull
- Sherman Badger: Canada's replacement of its Ram Badger, the Sherman Badger was a turretless M4A2 HVSS Sherman with a Wasp IIC flamethrower in place of the hull machine gun, developed sometime from 1945 to 1949. The 150 gallons at 250 psi was effective to 125 yards, with elevation of +30 to −10 degrees and traverse of 30 degrees left and 23 degrees right. This inspired the US T68.
- Sherman Adder: a conversion kit to equip Sherman tanks, used in India on Sherman IIIs and Sherman Vs

=== Tank, Infantry, Mk IV "Churchill" ===
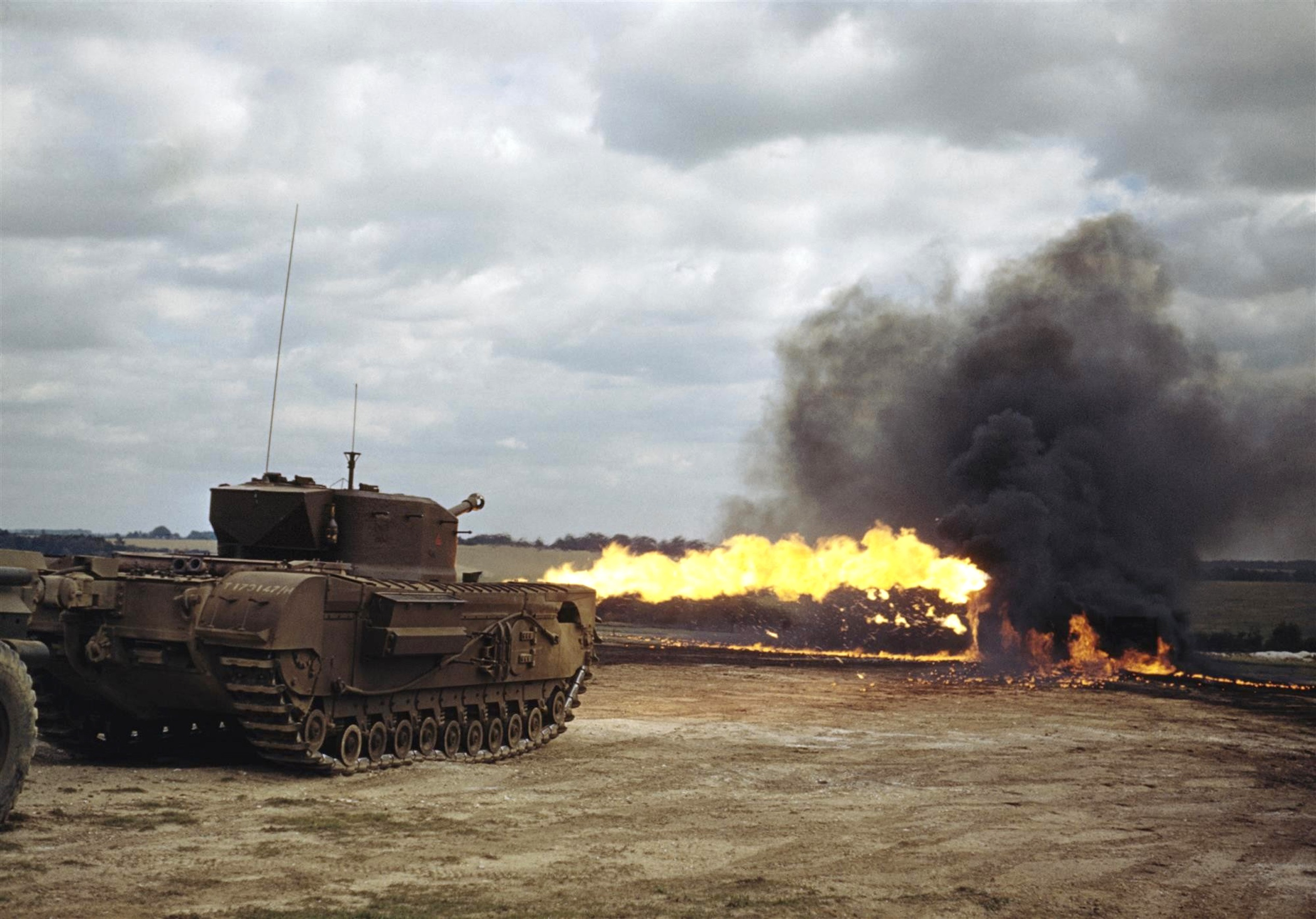
Churchill Crocodile flame tank

- Churchill Oke: Churchill Mk II with fixed "Ronson" flamethrower. Three were part of the 1942 Raid on Dieppe but were put out of action before the equipment was used.
- Churchill Crocodile: Churchill Mk VII equipped with a kit including an armored fuel trailer that used compressed nitrogen for pressure. The flamethrower replaced the hull machine gun leaving the main armament unaffected. Eight hundred conversion kits were produced. Operating under the organization of the 79th Armoured Division, as with other specialised vehicles, it was deployed following the 6 June 1944 Normandy landings in north-west Europe and in the Italian campaign. It could deliver eighty one-second bursts out to 120 yards (110 m) before refuelling.

=== Tank, infantry, Mk II, Matilda II ===
- Matilda Frog: 25 Matilda II tanks converted to flame tanks by the Australians in late 1944
- Matilda Murray: Australian improvement over the Frog, produced in 1945

=== Medium tank T-34 ===
- ОТ-34 (OT-34-76): created from various models of the T-34-76, had an internally mounted flame-thrower ATO-41 (ATO-42 later) replacing the hull machine gun
- OT-34-85: created from the T-34-85, had an internally mounted flamethrower ATO-42 replacing the hull machine gun

=== Heavy breakthrough tank KV (Kliment Voroshilov) ===
- KV-8: KV-1 fitted with the ATO-41 flame-thrower in the turret, beside a machine gun. In order to accommodate the new weapon, the 76.2 mm gun was replaced with a smaller, 45 mm, gun M1932, though it was disguised to look like the standard 76 mm.
- KV-8S: KV-1 fitted with the ATO-42 flame-thrower (improved version of ATO-41) in the turret. In order to accommodate the new weapon, the 76.2 mm gun was replaced with a smaller, 45 mm, gun M1932, though it was disguised to look like the standard 76 mm. Some KV-8S were created by mating the KV-1S hull with a KV-8 turret, while the remainder had a KV-1S turret with ATO-42 flamethrower but lacked the coaxial machine gun.
- KV-8M: an upgraded version of KV-8S equipped with two flamethrowers, replacing the coaxial machine gun in the turret and hull-mounted machine gun. Two prototypes were constructed.

=== Light tank T-26 ===
- KhT-26 (OT-26): developed in 1933. Based on the twin-turreted T-26 mod. 1931 tank but using a single turret armed with a flamethrower, the second turret was removed.
- KhT-130 (OT-130): flamethrower variant of model 1933, using a larger 45 mm gun turret (main gun was replaced with a flamethrower).
- KhT-133 (OT-133): flamethrower variant of model 1939 (main gun was replaced with a flamethrower).
- KhT-134 (OT-134): flamethrower variant of model 1939, with 45 mm gun intact and hull-mounted flamethrower. Prototype only.

=== Other ===
- Ram Badger: Canadian Ram cruiser tank adapted with flamethrower
- LVT(A)-4 Ronson: (1944) with full tracks, some armor, and a turret, arguably the landing vehicle tracked was a swimming light tank; this was a fire support version with M8 howitzer motor carriage turret but the 75 mm howitzer replaced with the Canadian Ronson flamethrower.
  - LVT-4(F) Sea Serpent: British version armed with flamethrowers, but unarmoured
- Wasp: not strictly a flame tank, the Universal Carrier (a small lightly armoured tracked personnel and equipment carrier) fitted with the Wasp flamethrower, a continued development of the Ronson by the Petroleum Warfare Department

== Post-war and Cold War tanks ==
- M4-A3E8 M4 Sherman with 105 howitzer and a coaxial H1A-H5A flamethrower
- M67 "Zippo": a variant of the US M48 Patton tank
- TO-55: a variant of the widely used Soviet T-55 tank
- TO-62: a variant of the Soviet T-62 MBT
- M132 armored flamethrower: First put in service in 1964, not actually based on a tank, but an armored flamethrower based on the M113 armored personnel carrier. This vehicle was successfully used during the Vietnam War.
- PM-1: Czechoslovak prototype based on the ST-I

== Post–Cold War and 21st century ==
Since 1978, flamethrowers and the last flame 'tank' the M132 armored flamethrower have not been part of the US arsenal. Though not banned, these weapons have fallen out of use and have instead been replaced with non-flamethrower incendiary weapons like thermobaric weapons which may have been fielded in Afghanistan by the United States in 2009 and by Russia in the 2022 Russo-Ukrainian war.

== See also ==
- Hobart's Funnies
- List of flamethrowers
