= 3rd Tank Battalion =

3rd Marine Tank Battalion
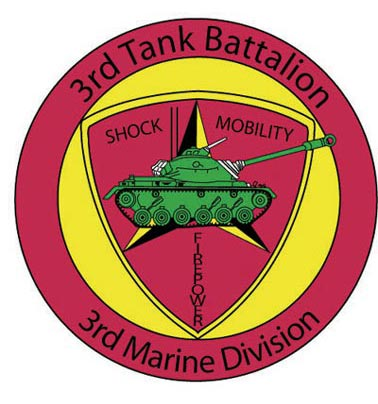
- 3rd Tank Battalion insignia
- Active: 16 September 1942 – 7 January 1946; 5 March 1952 – 1 June 1992
- Country: United States
- Branch: United States Marine Corps
- Type: Armor
- Role: Armor protected firepower and shock action.
- Size: Battalion
- Nickname: 3rd Tanks
- Mottos: Shock, Mobility, Firepower!
- Engagements: World War II: Battle of Bougainville; Battle of Guam; Battle of Iwo Jima; Vietnam War: Battle of Huế; Operation Desert Storm

The 3rd Tank Battalion (3rd Tanks) was an armor battalion of the United States Marine Corps. It was formed during World War II and played a part in several Pacific island battles, most notably Iwo Jima, where its flame tanks played a key role in securing the island. After the war, the battalion was based at Camp Pendleton but remained inactive until the outbreak of the Korean War, eventually moving to Okinawa. Along with the 1st Tank Battalion, 3rd Tanks was involved in major combat operations in South Vietnam from 1965 to 1969. Afterwards it concentrated on desert warfare and fought in the first Gulf War in 1991. It was deactivated for the last time in 1992.

== History ==
=== World War II ===
The 3rd Tank Battalion was formed during World War II on 16 September 1942. Each of the three regimental combat teams of the 3rd Marine Division had their own tank company and a scout car platoon. The 9th Marines tank company became Company A, 21st Marines company became Company B, and the 23rd Marines (later redesigned Third Marines) company became Company C.

When the battalion was formed it absorbed the three companies; a Headquarters and Service Company, Company D, and Company E (a Scout and Sniper Company). Company E (Scouts) was a combined arms reconnaissance (CAR) unit that had three scout platoons. They were formed from a group of reassigned reconnaissance scouts from the Scout and Sniper companies within the 3rd Marine Division. They became the forerunner of the Marine Division Reconnaissance assets used by the Marine divisions today. For greater mobility and firepower, the division commander equipped his scout company with light tanks to reinforce his regimental infantry units; especially useful for reconnaissance in force (RIF) tasks. Its mechanized armor uses are also in effect today. During the 1980s, the Light Armored Reconnaissance battalions were formed, revitalizing the same methods used during World War II.

In January–February 1943, they deployed to Auckland, New Zealand.

They participated in the Battle of Bougainville, Battle of Guam and the Battle of Iwo Jima. For Guam the battalion received six M4A2 Sherman's with E4-5 auxiliary flamethrowers in place of their 30 cal. bow guns. Arriving on Iwo Jima on 20 February 1945, the battalion brought its flame tanks and played an important role in the capture of the island. From Iwo Jima the battalion returned to the US via Guam. In Guam the battalion received 18 upgraded tanks produced by the Seabees that had been intended for the Army's 713th flame tank Battalion on Okinawa. The battalion embarked for San Diego in December 1945 and on 7 January 1946 was deactivated at Camp Pendleton. The Marine Corps would store the POA-CWS-H5 Flametanks the battalion received in Guam at Camp Pendleton and Hawaii. They would see action in Korea.

- The battalion received a Presidential Unit Citation for its actions on Iwo Jima.

=== Korean War ===
With the outbreak of the Korean War the battalion was reactivated at Camp Pendleton on 5 March 1952. In August 1953, the battalion sailed for Yokohama, Japan for service with the 3rd Marine Division at Camp Fuji. In February 1956, the 3d Tank Battalion was relocated to Okinawa and the following year moved to Camp Hansen, Okinawa.

=== Vietnam War ===
On 3 March 1965 SSgt John Downey, 3rd platoon, Company B, 3rd US Marine Corps 3rd Tank Battalion, drove his M48A3 Patton tank off the landing craft onto Red Beach 2 in I Corps, South Vietnam. SSgt Downey's USMC Patton tank became the first US tank to enter the Vietnam War. The 3rd Tank Battalion conducted combat operations in South Vietnam from 1965 to 1969 and set up a command post at Da Nang. In 1965 the 3rd Tanks engaged the Viet Cong 1st Regiment southwest of Da Nang, pushing them into the sea, and killing over 700 men. However, after the two-day battle, seven of the 3rd Tank Battalion's M48s had suffered hits, three of which were hit so badly they could no longer traverse their turrets, and one of the three was so damaged that it had to be destroyed by a demolition team.

Eventually two full battalions, consisting of the USMC 1st and 3rd Tank Battalions, would end up conducting combat operations in northern I Corps, South Vietnam. They participated in combat actions against communist forces during the Tet Offensive of 1968, and during the re-taking of the city of Huế, and the siege of Khe Sanh during that same enemy offensive. Until their re-deployment in November 1969, the 3rd Tanks served as an armored defense at the DMZ along the 17th Parallel.

=== Post Vietnam ===
This was a period of desert tactical doctrine development for the Marine Corps and the 3rd Tank Battalion played a major role developing the concept of the tank battalion as a maneuver element in extended inland warfare during a multitude of Combined Arms Exercises (CAX) and the 1981/82 joint training operation, Gallant Eagle.

Around the time of the Iran-U.S. Hostage Crisis (1979-1981) the US Department of Defense developed a concept for rapid deployment of forces which became the Rapid Deployment Joint Task Force (RDJTF). The 3rd Tank Battalion (-) Reinforced, along with an infantry battalion and an artillery battalion all collocated at Marine Corps Air Ground Combat Center (MCAGCC), Marine Corps Base 29 Palms, California became the combat power of the newly reformed 27th Marine Regiment in the newly formed 7th Marine Amphibious Brigade (MAB). The two headquarters for the 27th Marines and the 7th MAB received Navy Meritorious Unit Citations for the period May 1980 - Aug 1983.

=== Gulf War I ===
The battalion joined the 1st Marine Division upon that unit's arrival in Saudi Arabia on 15 August 1990, with the 3rd Tank Battalion mainly using M60A1s. They remained in support of the 7th Marine Regiment known as Task Force "Ripper." Alpha company was attached to 1/7 during the war. During Operation Desert Storm, the battalion fought a four-day ground campaign from 24 to 28 February 1991, and returned to the United States in April 1991. 3rd Tank Battalion and all of its subordinate companies were awarded the Navy Unit Citation for the period 14 Aug 1990 – 16 Apr 1991. The battalion was deactivated on 1 June 1992.

== Unit awards ==
A unit citation or commendation is an award bestowed upon an organization for the action cited. Members of the unit who participated in said actions are allowed to wear on their uniforms the awarded unit citation. 3rd Tanks was presented with the following awards:

Presidential Unit Citation with 1 bronze star

Navy Unit Commendation
Asiatic-Pacific Campaign Medal with 4 bronze stars

World War II Victory Medal
National Defense Service Medal with 2 bronze stars

Korean Service Medal
Southwest Asia Service Medal with 2 bronze stars
Vietnam Service Medal with 2 silver stars and 1 bronze star

Vietnam Cross of Gallantry with Palm Streamer

Kuwait Liberation Medal

== Insignia ==
The coat of arms of the 3rd Tank Battalion is that of the 3rd Marine Division, differenced by surmounting the caltrop with a M4A3 Sherman tank, as used on Iwo Jima during WWII and stenciled with a number "3" on the turret and "USMC" on the hull in gold, all above a Marine Corps emblem of gold. A gold banner above the shield is inscribed "Third Tank Battalion" and another below the shield has "Shock, Mobility, Firepower" in scarlet. Subsequent insignia and devices are variations of this original insignia, typically changing the tank to a more modern version.

== See also ==
- List of United States Marine Corps battalions
