= 1st Tank Battalion =

Military unit

1st Marine Tank Battalion
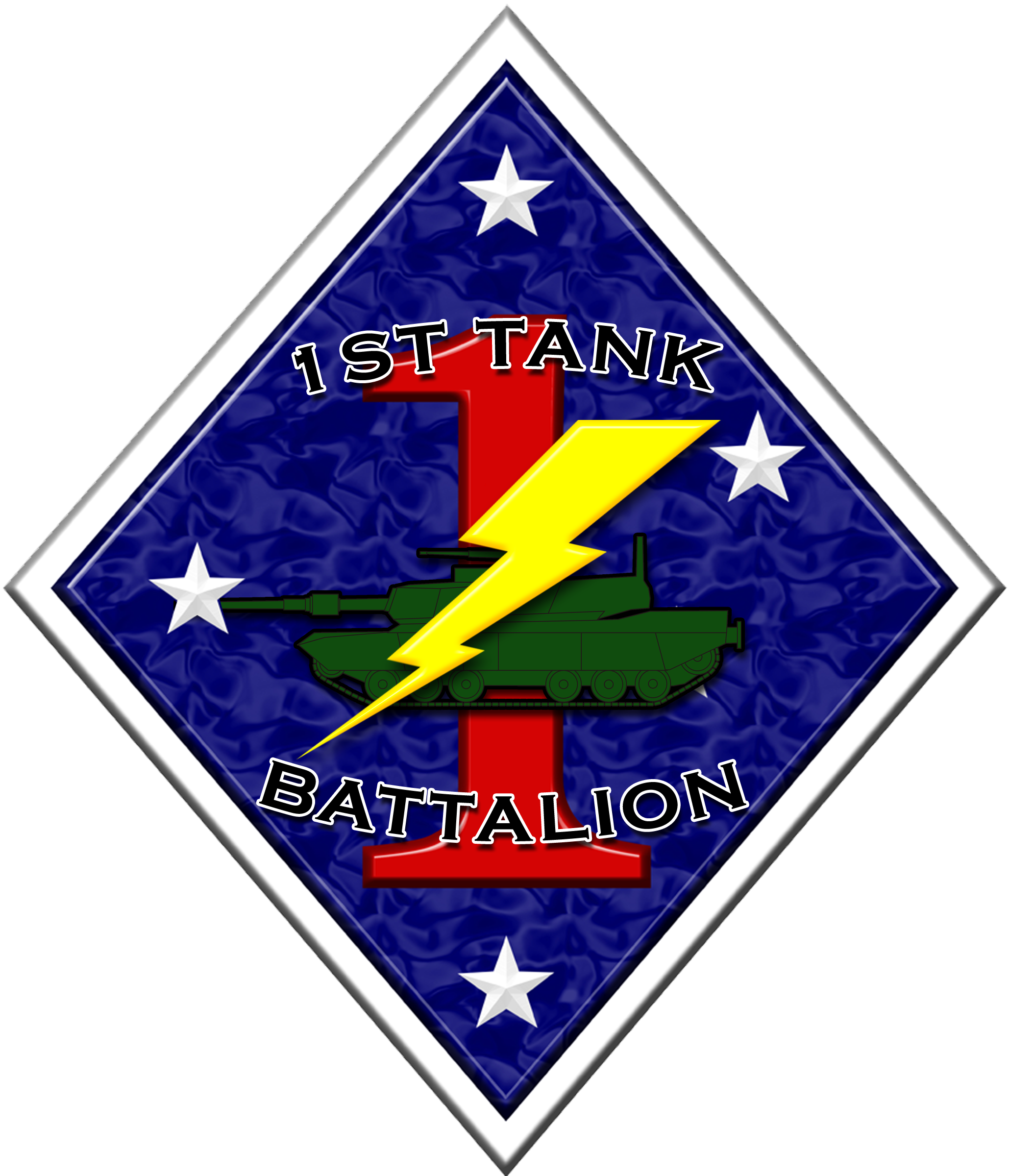
- 1st Tank Battalion insignia
- Active: 1 November 1941–21 May 2021
- Country: United States
- Branch: United States Marine Corps
- Type: Armor unit
- Role: Armor protected firepower and shock action.
- Size: Battalion
- Part of: 1st Marine Division; 1st Marine Expeditionary Force
- Garrison/HQ: Marine Corps Air Ground Combat Center Twentynine Palms
- Nickname: 1st Tanks
- Motto: "Steel on Target"
- Engagements: World War II: Guadalcanal campaign; New Guinea campaign; New Britain campaign; Battle of Peleliu; Battle of Okinawa; Korean War: Battle of Pusan Perimeter; Battle of Inchon; Second Battle of Seoul; Battle of Chosin Reservoir; Vietnam War; Gulf War; War on terror: Iraq War; War in Afghanistan

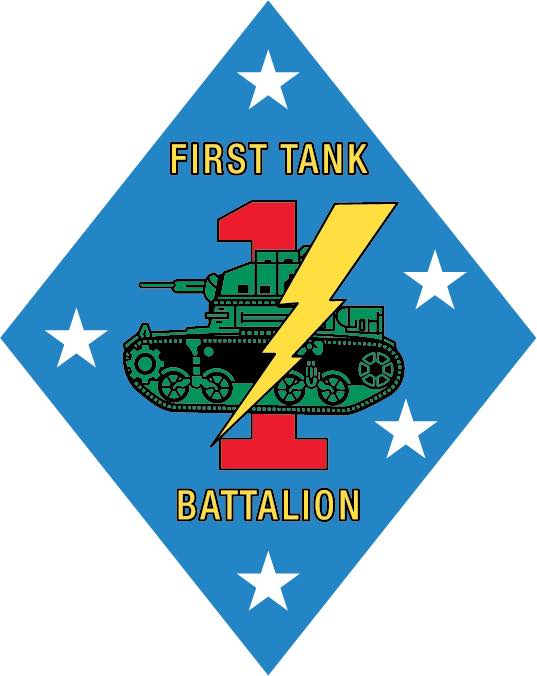
1st Tank Battalion Insignia

The 1st Tank Battalion was an armor battalion of the United States Marine Corps which was based out of the Marine Corps Air Ground Combat Center Twentynine Palms, California. It last fell under the command of the 1st Marine Division and I Marine Expeditionary Force. The unit was decommissioned in May 2021 as part of the service Force Design 2030 initiative which saw it move away from larger armor formations.

== Insignia ==
The coat of arms of the 1st Tank Battalion was a silver and gold contained within a green laurel. A gold banner above the arms is inscribed "First Tank Battalion" and another below the arms inscribed "August-Guadalcanal-1942" in scarlet.

The battle of Guadalcanal began in August 1942 and was the first combat action of the battalion and the M2A4 tank was the first tank used by the battalion. Additionally, the battalion was the only American military unit to ever use the M2A4 tank in battle. The use of this tank memorializes the first combat action of the battalion. The jousting shield is a unique device of mounted and armored warriors and has the upper corner cut away to better wield one's weapons. The colors of the shield and the 1st Marine Division numeral "1" identify the battalion with its parent division. The lightning bolt represents speed, shock effect and firepower. The laurel, in the crest, is an award of honor, recalling the courage, valor and sacrifices of the battalion.

This coat of arms has existed in Marine Corps records—in varied forms—since at least 1970. Other variations exist, often placing the emblems from the coat of arms (the number "1", the tank and lightning bolt) on a differently shaped shield or on the diamond insignia of the 1st Marine Division, often substituting a more modern tank for the original and sometimes rearranging the emblems. This latter device (the number "1", tank, and lightning bolt upon the diamond insignia of the 1st Marine Division) is commonly used as the distinctive unit insignia (or DUI, a badge-type device) of the battalion.

(From "U.S. Marine Corps Ground Unit Insignia.")

== Mission ==
To provide combat power to the 1st Marine Division in the form of amphibious and/or Maritime Preposition Forces; conduct operations ashore utilizing maneuver, armor protected firepower and shock action in order to close with and destroy the enemy.

As an independent battalion, First Tank Battalion is responsible to the Commanding General, 1st Marine Division for providing armored assets as well as anti-armor systems and staff expertise in their employment.

== History ==
The 1st Tank Battalion was activated on 1 November 1941 at Marine Corps Base Camp Lejeune, North Carolina and was attached to the 1st Marine Division. At this time, Headquarters and Service Company and Company B were organized. Company A had been in existence prior to this activation. This unit was originally activated on 1 August 1940 as the 3d Tank Company. It was reorganized and redesignated as Company A, 1st Tank Battalion, on 1 May 1941. Other companies of the battalion were later activated in early 1942.

=== World War II ===
After the outbreak of World War II the unit subsequently was ordered to the South Pacific and began movement to the area in the spring of 1942. Companies from the battalion were eventually deployed to Samoa and New Zealand. The first combat operation for units from the battalion was the Guadalcanal campaign, in which they were equipped with the predecessor of the famed M3 Stuart light tank; the M2A4 light tank. On 7 August 1942, Companies A and B took part in the 1st Marine Division's landings on the Japanese held island. The next month saw, M2A4 light tanks from the battalion supporting infantry units in the Battle of Edson's Ridge. The two companies continued to engage the enemy until the end of the year when the 1st Marine Division was relieved by the Army forces. The 1st Tank Battalion's campaign during this period was unique, in that the only combat experienced by the M2A4 light tank in World War II, by US forces, was while assigned to the US Marine Corps 1st Tank Battalion. The division was then moved to Australia in January 1943 where units of the 1st Tank Battalion were once again reunited.

Late that year the battalion moved to New Guinea to begin preparations for the Cape Gloucester, New Britain operation. 1st Marine Division units including the 1st Tank Battalion made an amphibious assault on Cape Gloucester the day after Christmas 1943. Battalion tanks were immediately committed to the drive to expand the beachhead; but progress was impeded, not only by the resistance of the Japanese but also by the torrential rains and the rough terrain. For the rest of the month and in early January, the Marines made heavy contact with Japanese forces.

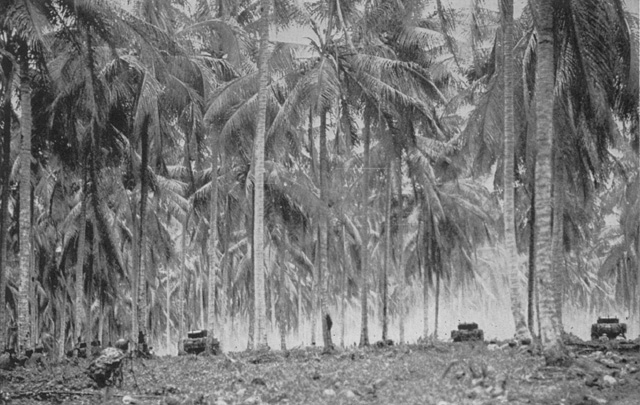
Tanks of the 1st Tank Battalion during the Battle of Arawe

Company B, which had been located on New Guinea, landed in the Arawe area of New Britain on 12 January 1944 to support Army forces there. Battalion units remained committed to the struggle for New Britain until Spring. By the beginning of May, however, all elements of the 1st Tank Battalion had been withdrawn from both New Britain and New Guinea and relocated to Pavavu Island in the Russell Islands.

The assault and capture of Peleliu in the Palau Group was the next combat mission for the battalion. On 15 September 1944, it participated in the initial landing on the island. The 1st Tank Battalion, during this campaign rendered conspicuous service in defeating the enemy. Bitter fighting for the battalion continued for another two weeks. On 2 October 1944, it was withdrawn and redeployed to the Russells.

The last campaign of the war for the 1st Tank Battalion was the assault on Okinawa. Beginning on 1 April 1945, the battalion was actively engaged in wresting control of the island fortress from the Japanese. The ferocity of the fighting during the battle is shown in the following losses of battalion tanks: 28 destroyed and 163 damaged.

The cessation of hostilities was followed by the deployment of the battalion to North China in early October for occupation duty in Tientsin. In January 1947, the battalion minus Company B was relieved of its responsibilities in China and ordered to Guam. Another transfer occurred four months later. This time the unit with the exception of Company A was returned to the United States. The battalion arrived at Marine Corps Base Camp Pendleton, California on 1 May 1947, where it remained for the following three years.

=== Korean War ===
Shortly after the Communist invasion of South Korea in June 1950, the battalion was ordered to prepare to mount out for the Far East. The first element of the battalion arrived in the war zone on 2 August 1950. Upon arrival, it disembarked at the port of Pusan and immediately commenced operations against the enemy. The battalion, with Company A now reattached also participated in the amphibious landing at Inchon on 15 September. The 1st Tank Battalion remained engaged with both North Korean and Chinese Communist forces for three years. Redeployment back to the United States finally came in 1955.

During WWII the 3rd Tank Battalion received 18 M4-A3R8 Shermans with coaxial flamethrowers that the Chemical Warfare Service: Flame Tank Group Seabees had produced. Postwar those tanks were dispersed between Hawaii and California. The Corps got nine of them together to form a flamethrowing platoon that was sent to Korea as a component of the 1st Tank Battalion.

=== Vietnam War ===
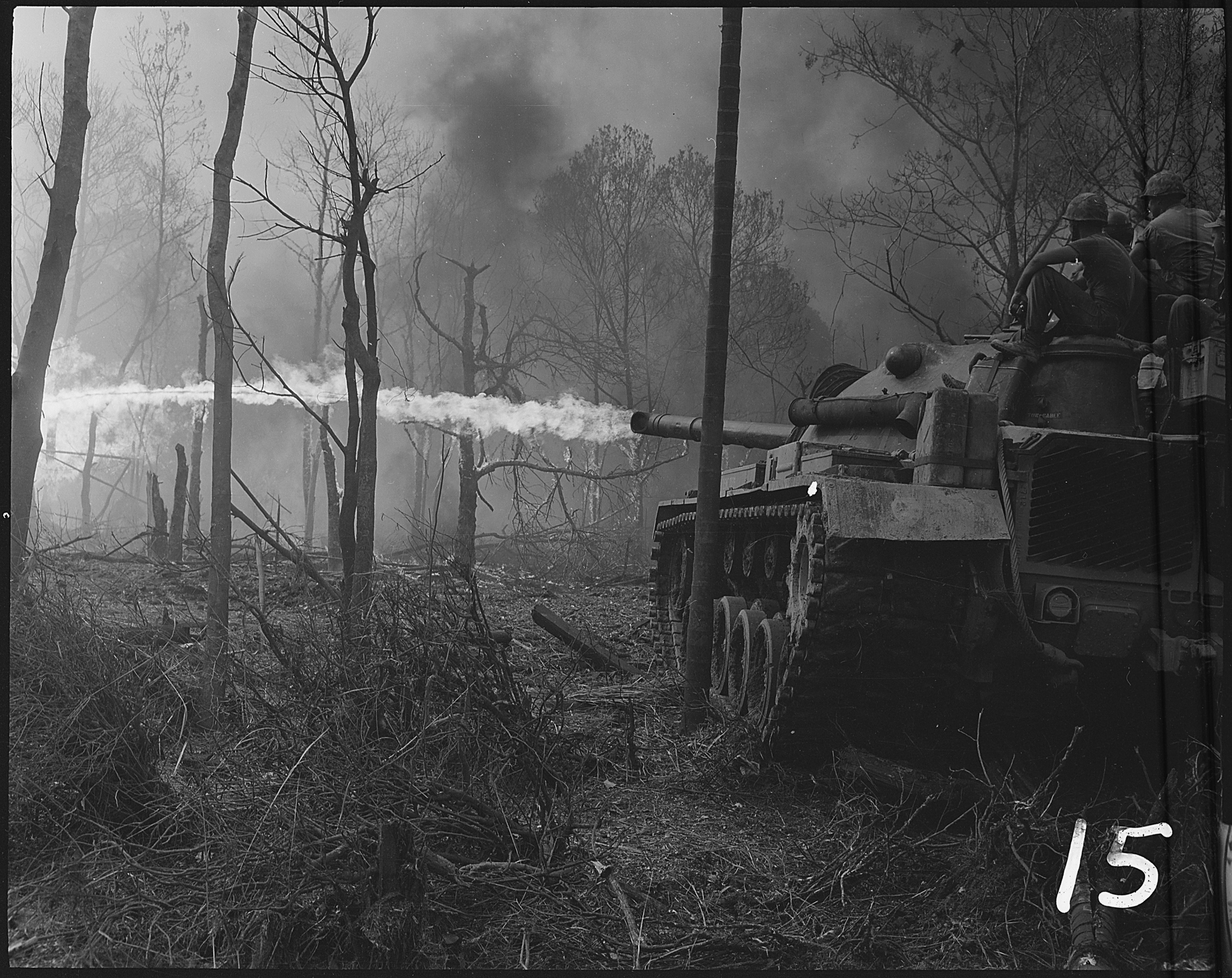
The 1st Tank Battalion tank received upgraded flamethrowing M48s for the Vietnam War.

In March 1966 most of 1st Tank's M48A3 Patton tanks were deployed to the Republic of Vietnam (South Vietnam). All of the battalion's components were reunited in Vietnam during May. Upon arrival in theater, the battalion was ordered to support 1st Marine Division units operating in Military Region I (MR-I), better known as I Corps, in tactical operations against the Viet Cong, and the North Vietnamese Army. The 1st Tank Battalion remained actively deployed until March 1970. At that time the Battalion was returned to Camp Pendelton.

=== Gulf War and the 1990s ===
When Iraq invaded Kuwait in August 1990, 1st Tank Battalion , led by Lt Col Michael Kephart, deployed to Saudi Arabia's part of 1st Marine Expeditionary Force. On 7 September, the battalion was fully equipped with M60A1 Combat Tanks from Maritime Preposition Squadron 3 and was deployed from Al Jubail, Saudi Arabia as the armored backbone of the multinational force which was established during Operation Desert Shield in 1990. On 24 February 1991, less than a month into the Desert Storm phase of the campaign, the 1st Tank Battalion spearheaded the assault of Task Force Papa Bear into Kuwait. Company A was supporting Task Force Ripper. By 27 February, 1st Tank Battalion had reached the Kuwait International Airport and all Iraqi forces were destroyed. The cease-fire was established on 28 February and by April 1991, the battalion returned home to Las Flores, Camp Pendleton. On 2 June 1992 the colors of 1st Tank Battalion were transferred to Marine Corps Air Ground Combat Center Twentynine Palms, California.

=== Iraq War ===
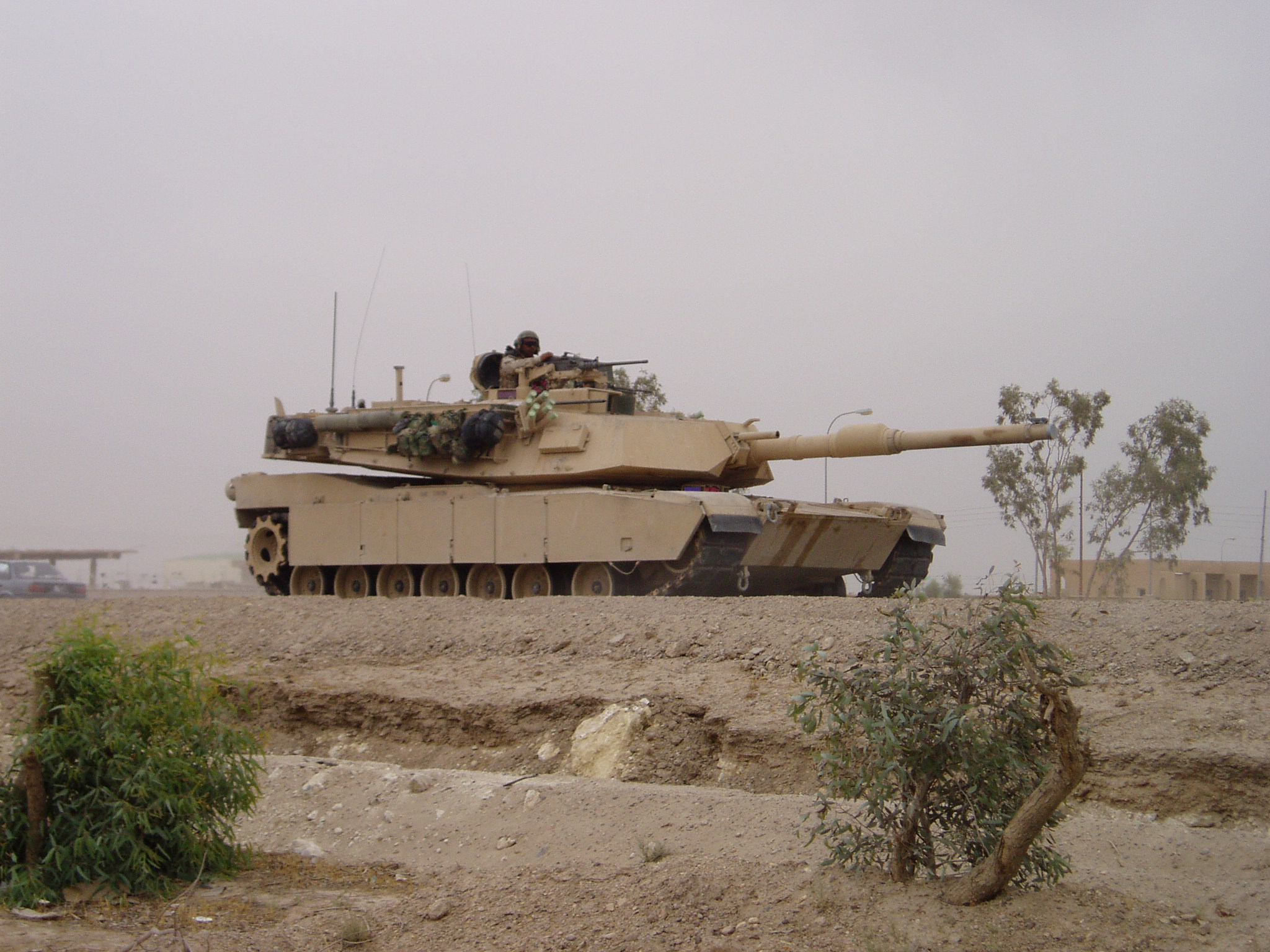
M1A1 outside of Fallujah on 9 May 2004

1st Tank Battalion participated in the 2003 invasion of Iraq during Operation Iraqi Freedom. They were present when Corporal Edward Chin of Bravo Company, (attached to 3rd Battalion 4th Marines) placed the American flag over Saddam's statue in Firdos Square before it was demolished. Since then, they have also participated in Operation Vigilant Resolve near and around the city of Fallujah. 1st Tank Battalion operated in support of Marine infantry for the duration of Operation Iraqi Freedom as armored support. Due to the continually shifting missions, members of the battalion also deployed as provisional infantry or provisional combat engineers. Currently 1st Tank Battalion is equipped with 58 M1A1 Abrams main battle tanks.

=== Afghanistan ===
On 1 January 2011 Company D, 1st Tank Battalion, deployed to Camp Leatherneck, Afghanistan and was the first American mechanized unit to deploy with the M1A1 Main Battle Tank in the War in Afghanistan. These Tank Companies deployed in support of International Security Forces- Afghanistan. Company D deployed from Jan to Jul 2011, Company A deployed from Jan to Jul 2012, and Company D deployed from Jan to Jul 2013 as Tank Companies. In this time Company C deployed as a route clearance company (Oct 2011 to May 2012), Company B with elements from H&S Company deployed as an advisory team (Jan 2012 to Jul 2012).

=== Decommissioning ===
1st Tank Battalion was officially decommissioned on 21 May 2021 at a ceremony held at MCAGCC 29 Palms, CA. Its commission in Palm Springs was done so after the Gulf War, when the USMC began to downsize their heavy armor brigades. Instead of retiring the oldest tank battalion, they retired 3rd tank battalion and transferred the great moniker of First Tanks, preserving the true history of The Corps. The eventual deactivation was part of a larger restructuring of the Marine Corps as part of the Commandant's Force Design 2030 initiative. The Marine Corps is divesting itself of larger, armor formations in order to create more expeditionary formations that can operate in the Indo-Pacific and provide long range precision fires in support of fleet maneuver.

== Notable former members ==
- Gunnery Sergeant Nick Popaditch, an Iraq veteran severely wounded in the Battle of Fallujah.

== See also ==
- List of United States Marine Corps battalions
- Organization of the United States Marine Corps
