= Nick Popaditch =

Recipient of the Silver Star (born 1967)

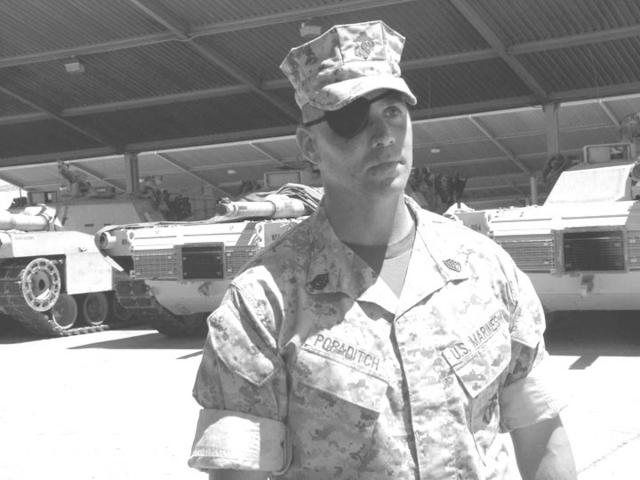
- Popaditch in 2005

Personal details
- Born: July 2, 1967 (age 59) Hammond, Indiana, U.S.
- Party: Republican
- Education: San Diego State University
- Awards: Silver Star; Purple Heart
- Nickname: Gunny Pop

Military service
- Allegiance: United States
- Branch/service: United States Marine Corps
- Years of service: 1986–1992, 1995–2005
- Rank: Gunnery Sergeant
- Unit: 1st Tank Battalion
- Battles/wars: Persian Gulf War; Iraq War: 2003 invasion; Battle of Baghdad; First Battle of Fallujah

Nicholas Allen Popaditch (born July 2, 1967) is a medically retired United States Marine Corps gunnery sergeant who gained fame as the "Cigar Marine", recipient of the Silver Star and Purple Heart. He ran unsuccessfully as the 2010 Republican candidate for California's 51st congressional district, losing to incumbent Democrat Bob Filner. He ran again in 2012 in the 53rd congressional district, losing to incumbent Democrat Susan Davis.

== Early life and education ==
Popaditch was born in East Chicago, Indiana and was raised in Terre Haute, Indiana. After choosing not to take up a college scholarship, he enlisted in the Marine Corps.

== Military career ==
Popaditch enlisted in the US Marine Corps in 1986, served as a tank commander, and eventually rose to the rank of gunnery sergeant. He saw action in the first Gulf War in 1991 and was honorably discharged in 1992. In 1995, he rejoined the Corps and served with the 1st Tank Battalion at Marine Corps Air Ground Combat Center Twentynine Palms and later became a drill instructor at Marine Corps Recruit Depot San Diego.

During the Iraq War, Staff Sergeant Popaditch was assigned as a tank commander and platoon sergeant. Participating in the 2003 invasion of Iraq, his unit gained fame when it helped topple the statue of Saddam Hussein in Firdos Square on April 9, 2003. Associated Press photographer Laurent Rebours photographed Popaditch in his tank's cupola, smoking a cigar with the statue of Saddam looming in the background. The image, which earned him the nickname "The Cigar Marine," appeared on the front pages of newspapers around the world to describe the Battle of Baghdad. He would later reveal that his smoking was a celebration of his and his wife's twelfth wedding anniversary as well as victory. Following his return to the United States, he was promoted to gunnery sergeant and volunteered to return to Iraq in 2004.

During his second deployment, Popaditch commanded tanks again in the First Battle of Fallujah in April 2004. During the battle on April 7, supported dismounted infantry with a pair of M1A1 Abrams, and turning onto a narrow street, he opened his hatch for better visibility despite the constant RPG-7 attacks. He was wounded in action in an ambush when a rocket propelled grenade struck him in the head. Blinded and deafened, he struggled to maintain consciousness until his tank was moved out of danger, then was evacuated to Landstuhl Regional Medical Center in Germany. After a prolonged stay, he was sent back to the United States, ultimately losing his right eye (due to damage to the optic nerve) and hearing in his right ear. On November 10, 2005, he was awarded the Silver Star for actions in combat. and medically retired at the rank of Gunnery Sergeant in May 2005.

== Civilian career ==
After a brief recovery period living in Monterey, California, Popaditch became an active advocate of veteran's issues. In addition to advising and consulting, he serves on the boards of multiple organizations advancing the care of wounded veterans and their families, such as the Purple Heart Advisory board of the Freedom is Not Free organization, the Vet Foundation, the US Department of Veterans Affair's Patient-Centered Care Steering Committee, and speaks for the Injured Marine Semper Fi Fund, The Marine Corps Scholarship Foundation of the Desert Cities, and the Independence Fund. Popaditch was profiled by MTV when he was trained by the Wounded Marine Career Foundation in sound production, and later graduated magna cum laude earning a Bachelor of Arts in education from San Diego State University.

In 2008, Popaditch authored, with Mike Steere, the memoir Once a Marine: An Iraq War Tank Commander's Inspirational Memoir of Combat, Courage, and Recovery, (Savas Beatie LLC, 2008), which detailed his combat experiences, recovery, and difficulties with disability and Veterans Administration. It received favorable reviews, was featured on the Commandant of the Marine Corps' recommended professional reading list for all ranks, won The Military-Writers Book of the Year for 2009, and was a national book club selection. In 2012, Popaditch was residing in Chula Vista, and was married, and has two sons. In 2013, Popaditch authored a 178-page book The Ultimate Marine Recruit Training Guidebook, a book for potential Marine recruits. In 2014, Popaditch was studying to become a math teacher.

=== Political campaigns ===
==== 2010 ====
On November 10, 2009, Popaditch announced his campaign for California's 51st congressional district as a Republican. The incumbent, Democrat Bob Filner, has held the seat since 1992. It is viewed by most as a Democratic district, though George W. Bush earned 46% of the vote there in 2004. Popaditch was endorsed by former presidential candidate and Governor of Arkansas Mike Huckabee and former Congressman Duncan L. Hunter; he cited his "love of country" for why he was running for political office. There was also a controversy within the Veterans of Foreign Wars when members disagreed over endorsement, another when the Imperial Valley Press published an editorial cartoon mocking his eyepatch (which Filner called "in poor taste"), and a third when Filner's campaign ran an advertisement accusing Popoditch of not voting in the past eleven years. He was unopposed in the Republican primary, was profiled in the Wall Street Journal, but lost 60%-40% to Filner.

==== 2012 ====
In January 2012, Popaditch announced his intention to seek the congressional seat in the newly redistricted 53rd Congressional District against incumbent Democrat Susan Davis. He received 42% of the vote during the June primary. Endorsed by the San Diego Union Tribune, he lost to Davis in the general election, receiving 39.6% of the vote.

== Awards ==
Popaditch is the recipient of the following awards:

| | Silver Star | Purple Heart | |
| Navy and Marine Corps Commendation Medal | Navy and Marine Corps Achievement Medal w/ valor device & 1 award star | Combat Action Ribbon w/ 1 award star | Navy Presidential Unit Citation |
| Navy Unit Commendation | Navy Meritorious Unit Commendation w/ 1 service star | Marine Corps Good Conduct Medal w/ 4 service stars | National Defense Service Medal w/ 1 service star |
| Southwest Asia Service Medal w/ 2 service stars | Global War on Terrorism Expeditionary Medal | Global War on Terrorism Service Medal | Armed Forces Service Medal |
| Navy Sea Service Deployment Ribbon w/ 3 service stars | Marine Corps Drill Instructor Ribbon | Kuwait Liberation Medal (Saudi Arabia) | Kuwait Liberation Medal (Kuwait) |

=== Silver Star citation ===
The President of the United States of America takes pleasure in presenting the Silver Star to Gunnery Sergeant Nicholas A. Popaditch, United States Marine Corps, for conspicuous gallantry and intrepidity in action against the enemy while serving as Tank Platoon Sergeant, First Platoon, Company C, First Tank Battalion, Second Battalion, First Marine Regiment, FIRST Marine Division, I Marine Expeditionary Force, in support of Operation IRAQI FREEDOM from 6 to 7 April 2004. While on patrol in the city of Al Fallujah, Iraq, Fox Company came under heavy enemy fire and without hesitation, Gunnery Sergeant Popaditch surged his two tanks into the city to support the Marines under fire. He led his tank section several blocks into the city, drawing enemy fire away from the beleaguered Marines. His decisive actions enabled Fox Company to gain a foothold into the city and evacuate a critically wounded Marine. For several hours, enemy forces engaged his tank section with withering rocket-propelled grenade fire until they were destroyed by accurate machine gun fire. Acting as the forward observer for an AC-130 gunship, Gunnery Sergeant Popaditch directed fire onto enemy targets effecting their annihilation. With complete disregard for his personal safety, he moved his tank forward to draw the enemy from their covered and concealed positions allowing the AC-130 to engage them. On the morning of 7 April, Gunnery Sergeant Popaditch was severely wounded by a rocket-propelled grenade blast while fighting insurgents. Blinded and deafened by the blast, he remained calm and ordered his crew to a medical evacuation site. By his bold leadership, wise judgment, and complete dedication to duty, Gunnery Sergeant Popaditch reflected great credit upon himself and upheld the highest traditions of the Marine Corps and the United States Naval Service.
