= M67 flame thrower tank =

Flame thrower tank M67
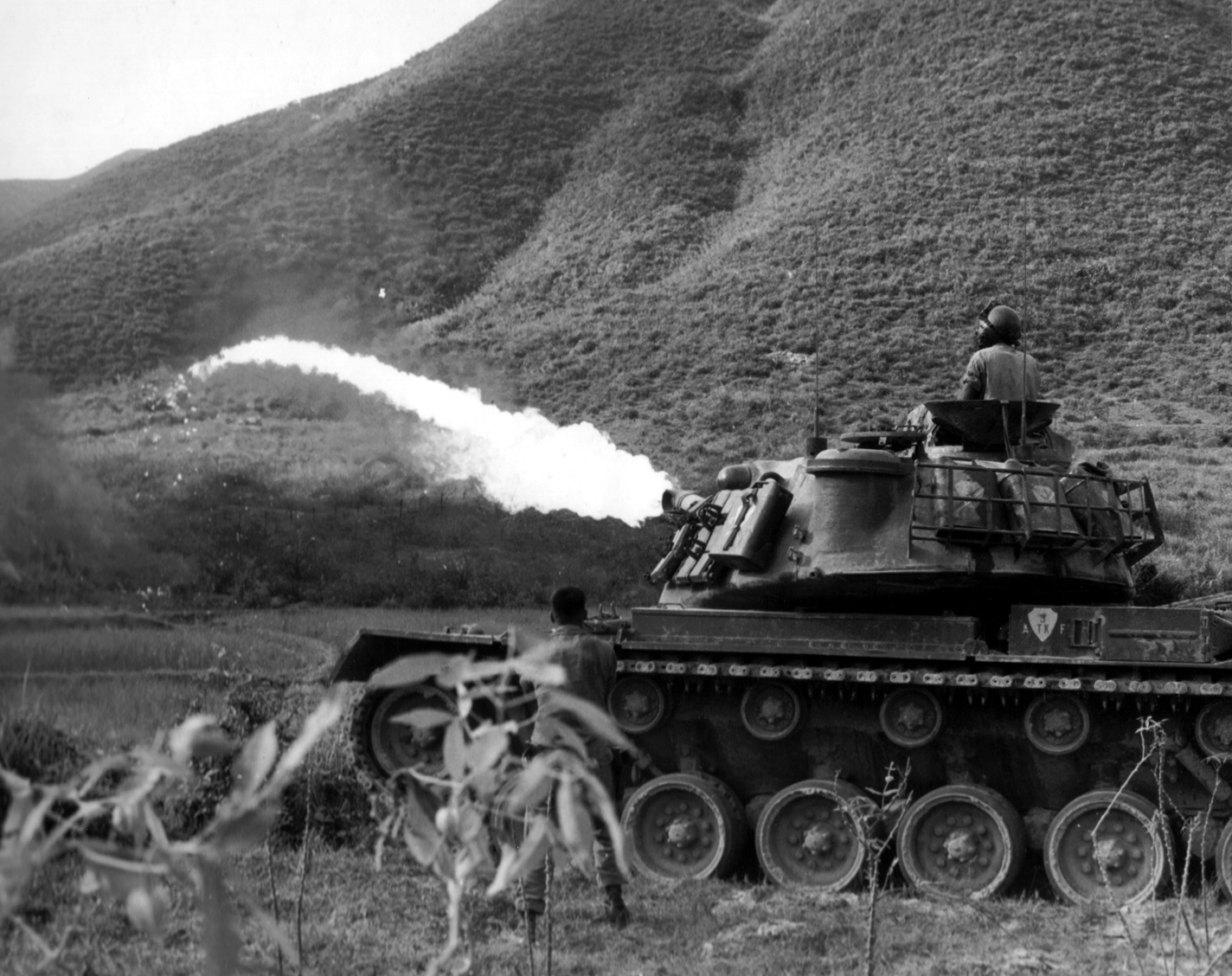
- US Marine Corps M67 in action near Da Nang during Vietnam War.
- Type: Medium flame tank
- Place of origin: United States

Service history
- In service: 1955–1974
- Used by: United States
- Wars: Vietnam War

Production history
- Designer: Chemical Corps
- Designed: 1954
- Manufacturer: Detroit Arsenal
- Produced: 1955–1956
- No. built: 109

Specifications
- Mass: 48 metric tons
- Length: 22 ft 7 in (6.871 m); 26 ft 6 in (8.138 m) (with gun forward)
- Width: 11 ft 11 in (3.632 m)
- Height: 10 ft 1 in (3.089 m)
- Crew: 3
- Armor: 178 mm maximum
- Main armament: M7-6 tank flamethrower
- Secondary armament: 1 × .50 in (12.7 mm) M2 MG; 1 × .30 cal (7.62 mm) M1919A4 MG
- Engine: Continental AV-1790-5B V12, air-cooled carburetor petrol engine 810 hp (604 kW)
- Transmission: General Motors CD-850, 2 ranges forward, 1 reverse
- Suspension: Torsion bar suspension
- Ground clearance: 1 ft 4 in (0.42 m)
- Fuel capacity: 757 litres (M67); 1268 litres (M67A1); 1457 litres (M67A2)
- Operational range: 115 km (71,5 miles)
- Maximum speed: 48 km/h (30 mph)

The flame thrower tank M67 (also known as M67 "Zippo", nicknamed after a popular brand of cigarette lighter) is an American flame tank that was briefly used by the U.S. Army, and later by the U.S. Marine Corps during the Vietnam War. It was the last flamethrower tank used in American military service.

== Background and development ==
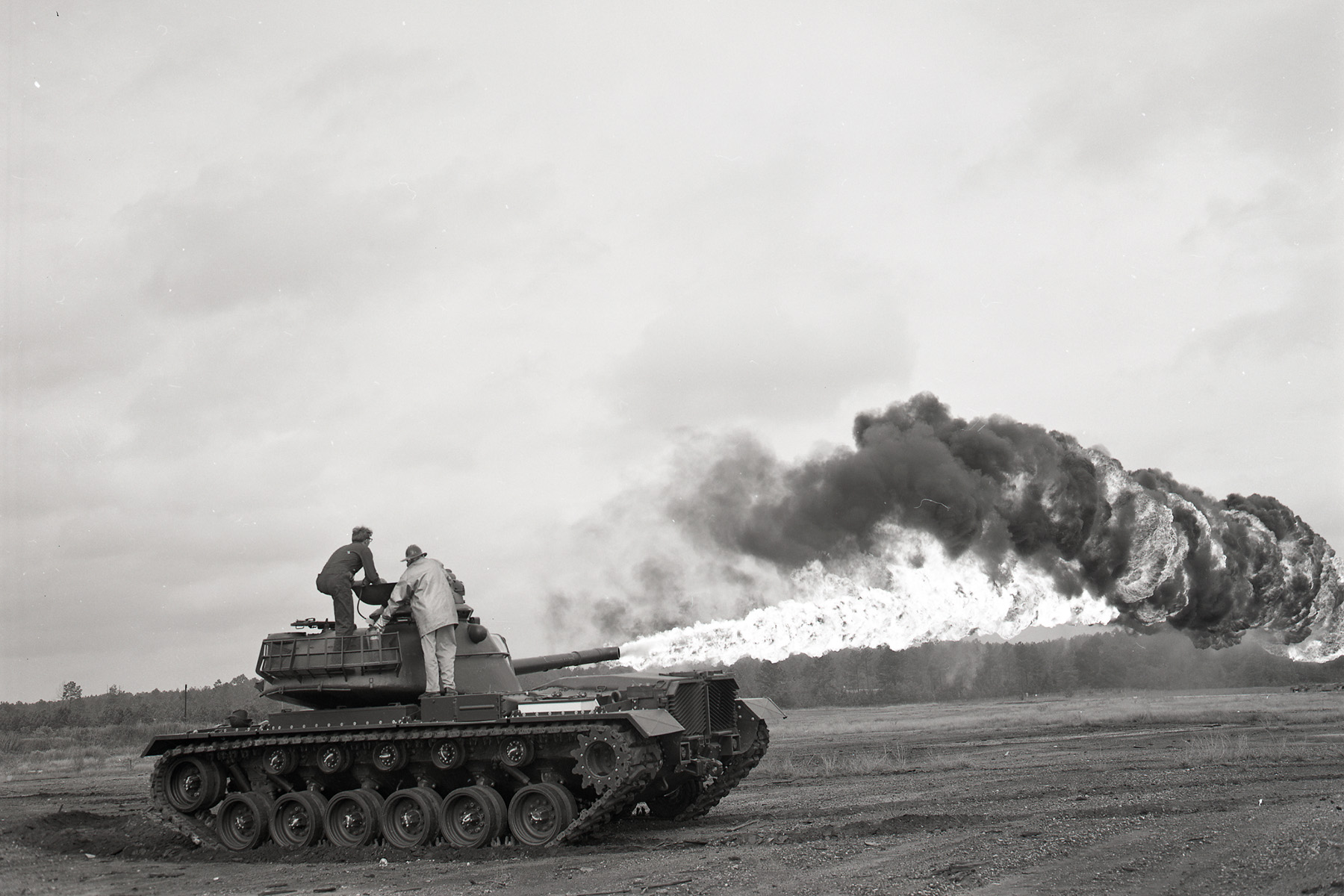
M67A2 undergoing tests at Anniston Army Depot

Drawing on the experiences of crews of M4 Sherman tanks that were converted into flamethrower tanks and used during World War II, the U.S. Army Chemical Corps began work on a successor tank that was designed for the battlefields of the Cold War. Work on the design took place between 1952 and 1954, utilizing a modified M48 tank chassis, at the initiative of the US Marine Corps. Production commenced in 1955 and ran for either a single year or four, depending on some estimates. A total of 109 M67 tanks were produced for the Marine Corps and US Army.

== Service history ==
The M67 was primarily used for mop-up style operations, and like all flamethrower tanks, it was intended to be used primarily against infantry. The "Zippo" featured no main cannon; the M48's 90mm gun was replaced with the tank's flamethrower. While firing in quick bursts, the M67's firing was described as appearing as "rods of flames". The natural fear of being burned alive gave an added shock factor to the M67.

The M67 remained in service until 1974, when it was retired from use without a replacement. The modern-day United States military has no flamethrower tanks in service.

== Variants ==
- T67: Prototype flamethrower tank used for testing purposes.
- M67: First version used in service.
- M67A1: M48A2 Patton converted to use the flamethrower tank turret M1.
- M67A2: M48A3 Patton converted to use the flamethrower tank turret M1.

== Former operators ==
- United States: Used by U.S. Army, and by U.S. Marine Corps from 1955 to 1974.

== Bibliography ==
- Hunnicutt., R. P. (1984). Patton: A History of American Medium Tank Volume I. (1st ed.). Novato, CA: Presidio Press. ISBN 0-89141-230-1.
