= Ronson flamethrower =

WWII Allied mechanized flamethrower

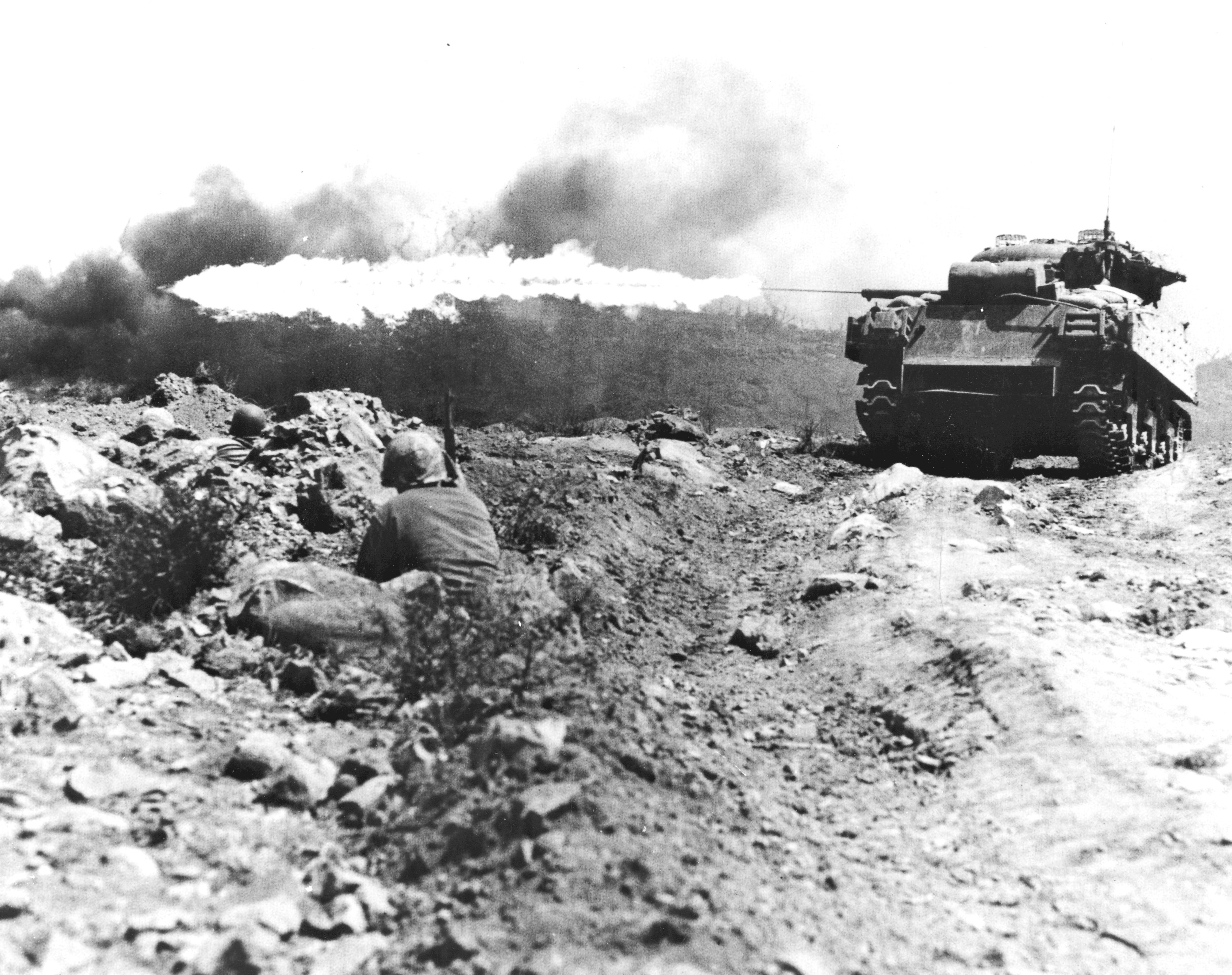
Ronson tank

Named after a famous lighter company, the "Ronson" flamethrower was developed for mechanized applications during World War II and used by the Canadian Army and the United States Marine Corps.

The Ronson was developed by the British Petroleum Warfare Department in 1940. Having insufficient range it was passed over for British use but taken up by the Canadians for development. The "Ronson" was considered sufficient for use in the production of the "Wasp MkIIC" flamethrower variant of the Universal Carrier.

From there it came to the attention of the United States. V Amphibious Corps placed an order for 20 units followed by another for 10. These were given to Col. Unmacht of the Chemical Warfare Service CENPAC, at Schofield Barracks, Territory Hawaii. Seabees under his command installed the Ronson units in 24 M3 Stuarts for the Battle of Saipan. Those tanks were nicknamed "Satans". Col Unmachts men used the Ronson to develop USMC M4 Shermans with Navy Mark 1 flamethrowers. These tanks were used in the Battle of Iwo Jima. Col Unmacht's Flamethrower Group would also install Ronsons in the first generation coaxial flame tanks designated CWS-POA-H5 (Chemical Warfare Service-Pacific Ocean Area-Hawaii).

== See also ==
- List of flamethrowers
