= M4 Sherman variants =

Tank variants of World War II

The M4 Sherman tank was produced in several variants, a result of mass production spread across several manufacturers and several years. It was also the basis for a number of related vehicles and Shermans have been modified by several nations, ranging from upgrades to complete hull conversions for another task. Originally designed in 1941, M4 variants were still used by Israel during the 1967 and 1973 wars with its Arab neighbors.

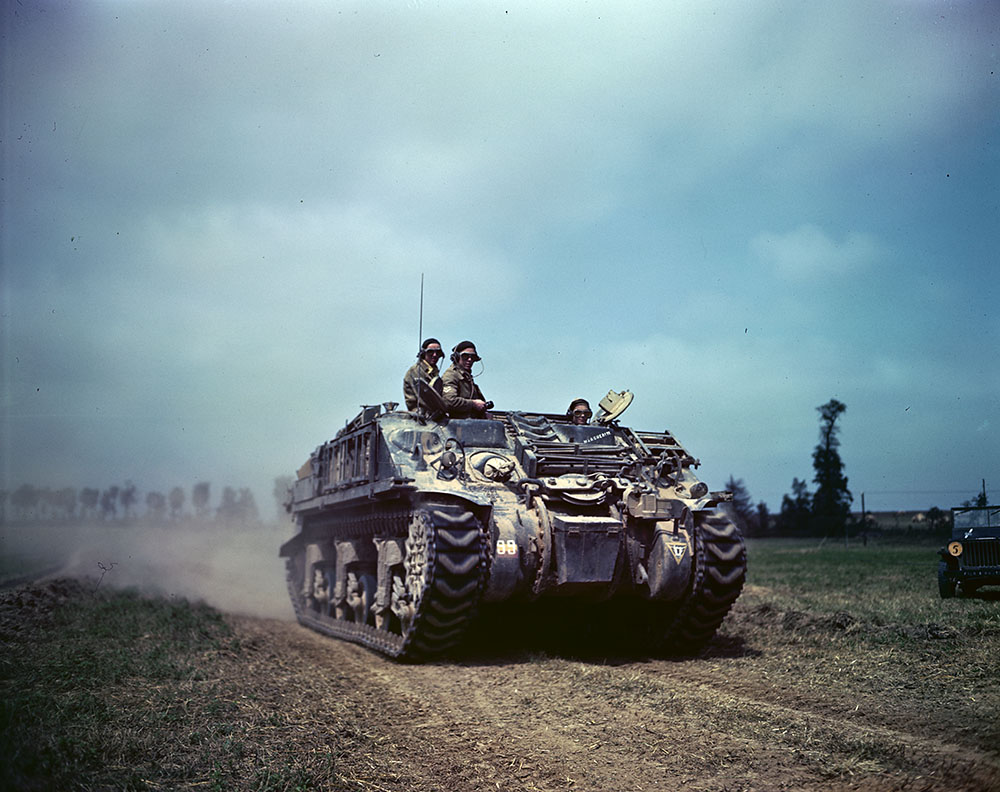
Sherman ARV MK I, Recovery vehicle, photographed around Caen in July–August 1944

The many special duties that a tank might be made to do were just being explored by armies around the world in the early 1940s. Theories of what vehicles were supposed to be engaging enemy tanks changed as vehicles like the Sherman often found themselves up against enemy armor, and consequently some of the most important initial changes centered on up-gunning the basic vehicle. Improving the vehicle's mobility, protection, and creating specific variants for infantry-support roles soon followed. Similar modification of the main armament would be done by the British, who received a number of Shermans through Lend-Lease during the course of the war, producing the Sherman Firefly tank (armed with a powerful 17-pounder tank gun).

Many early variants of the Sherman were converted to armored personnel carriers (called "Kangaroos") or armoured recovery vehicles.

In preparation for the invasion of Europe by Allied forces in 1944, an amphibious "swimming" version of the Sherman was used. Extensive work on creating mine-clearance devices to be attached to Shermans in some fashion was also conducted up until the end of the Second World War, such as the Sherman Crab mine-flail tank.

After the Second World War, large numbers of surplus Shermans were supplied to other nations, primarily to Africa, South America and the Middle East. Israel became the largest post-war user of Sherman tanks, conducting extensive modifications to keep them in frontline service right up into the early 1970s as tanks, mobile artillery pieces, armored ambulances and many more versions. Many saw action in the 1967 Six-Day War and 1973 October War. Similar modifications and purchases of Israeli-modified Shermans were done in South America, where they served on as the last fighting Shermans right up until 1989.

There are many variants of the Sherman, ranging from the M4, M4A1, M4A2, M4A3 and M4A4, which also encompass many sub-variants (such as the M4 (105) or M4A3E8 "Easy Eight", among others).

== US variants ==
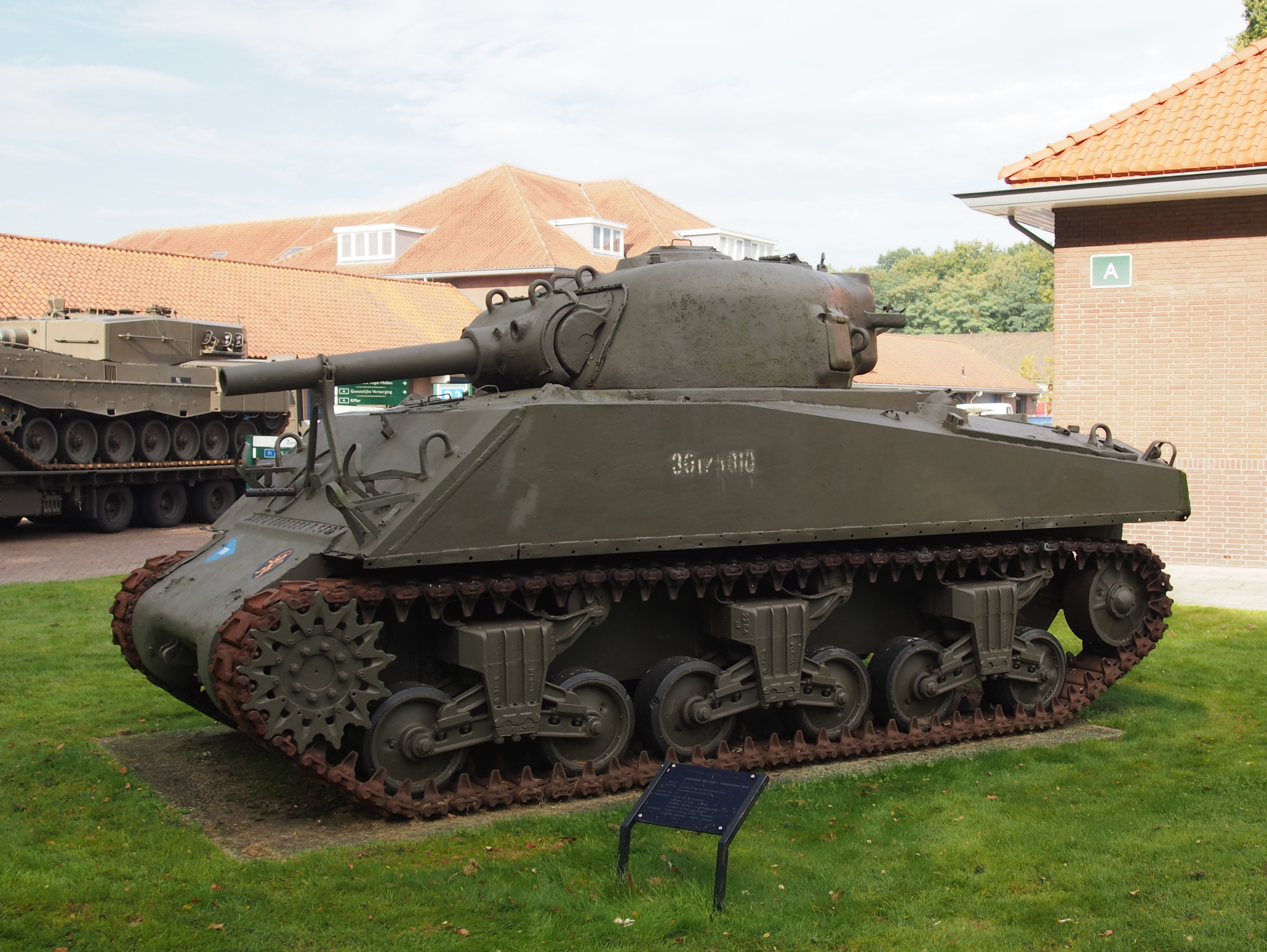
M4(105).

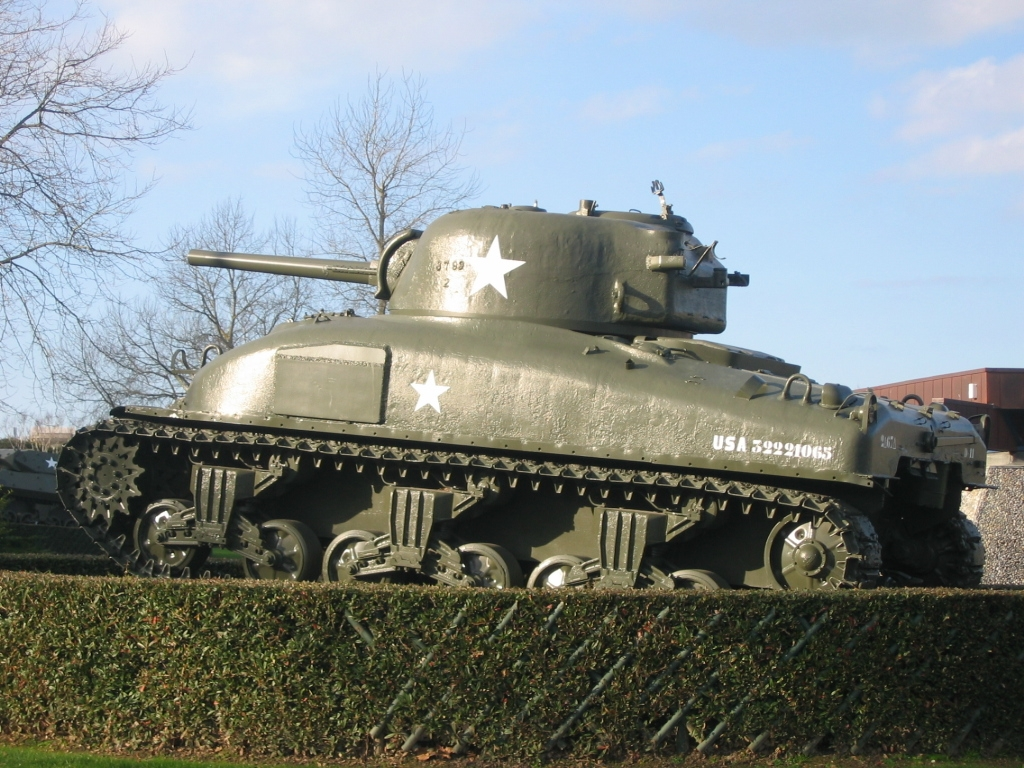
M4A1 (cast hull). Note the rounded edges of its fully cast upper hull. Variants from the M4 and M4A1 share the same 9-cylinder radial engine profile.

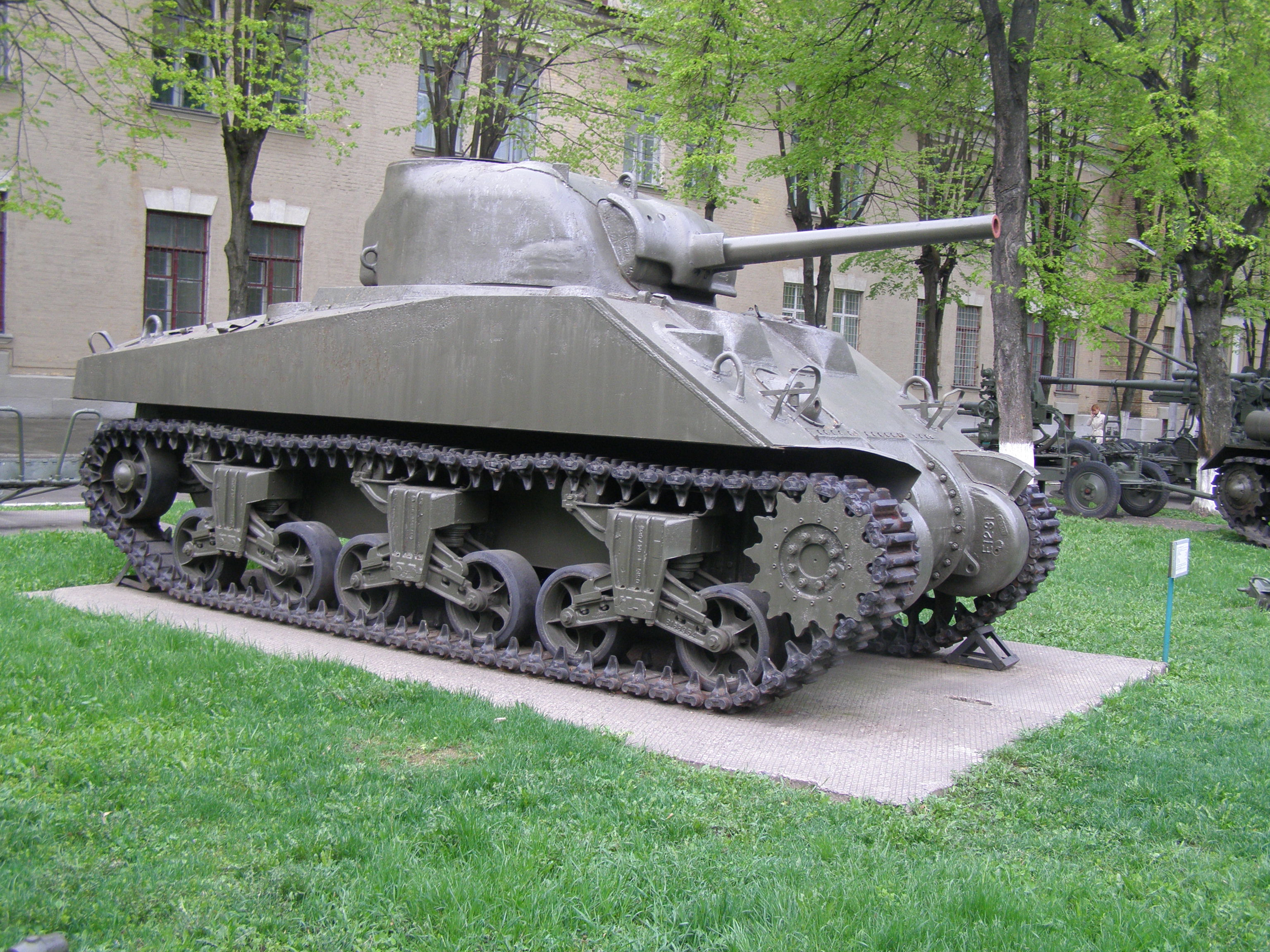
M4A2

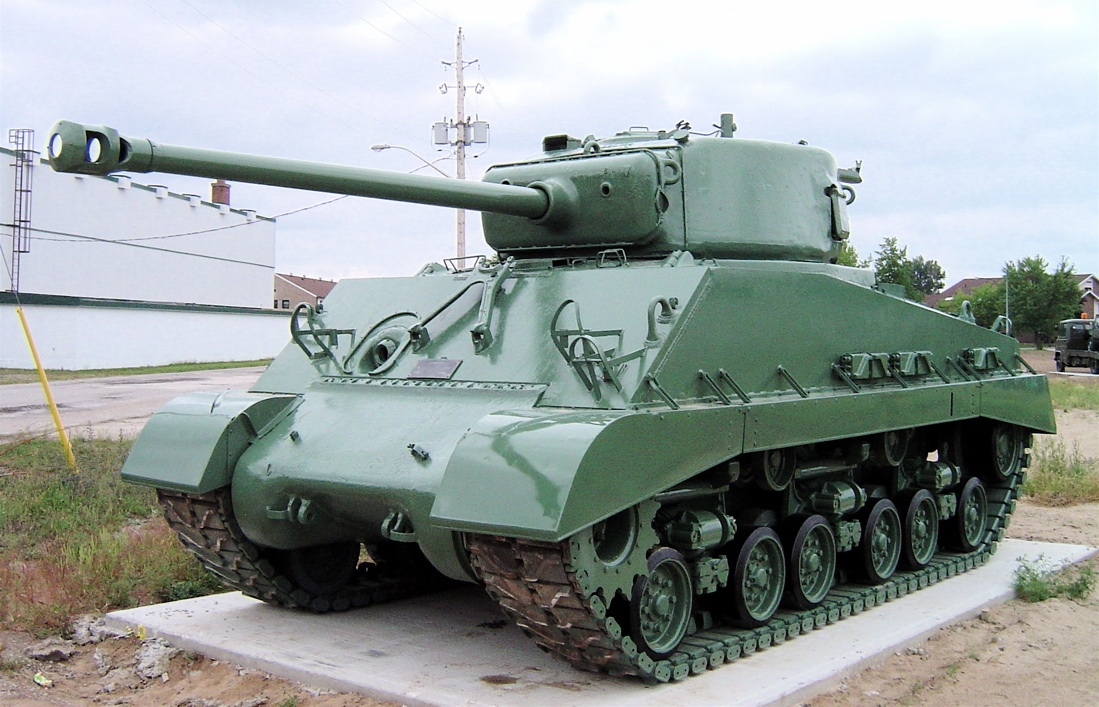
M4A2 HVSS.

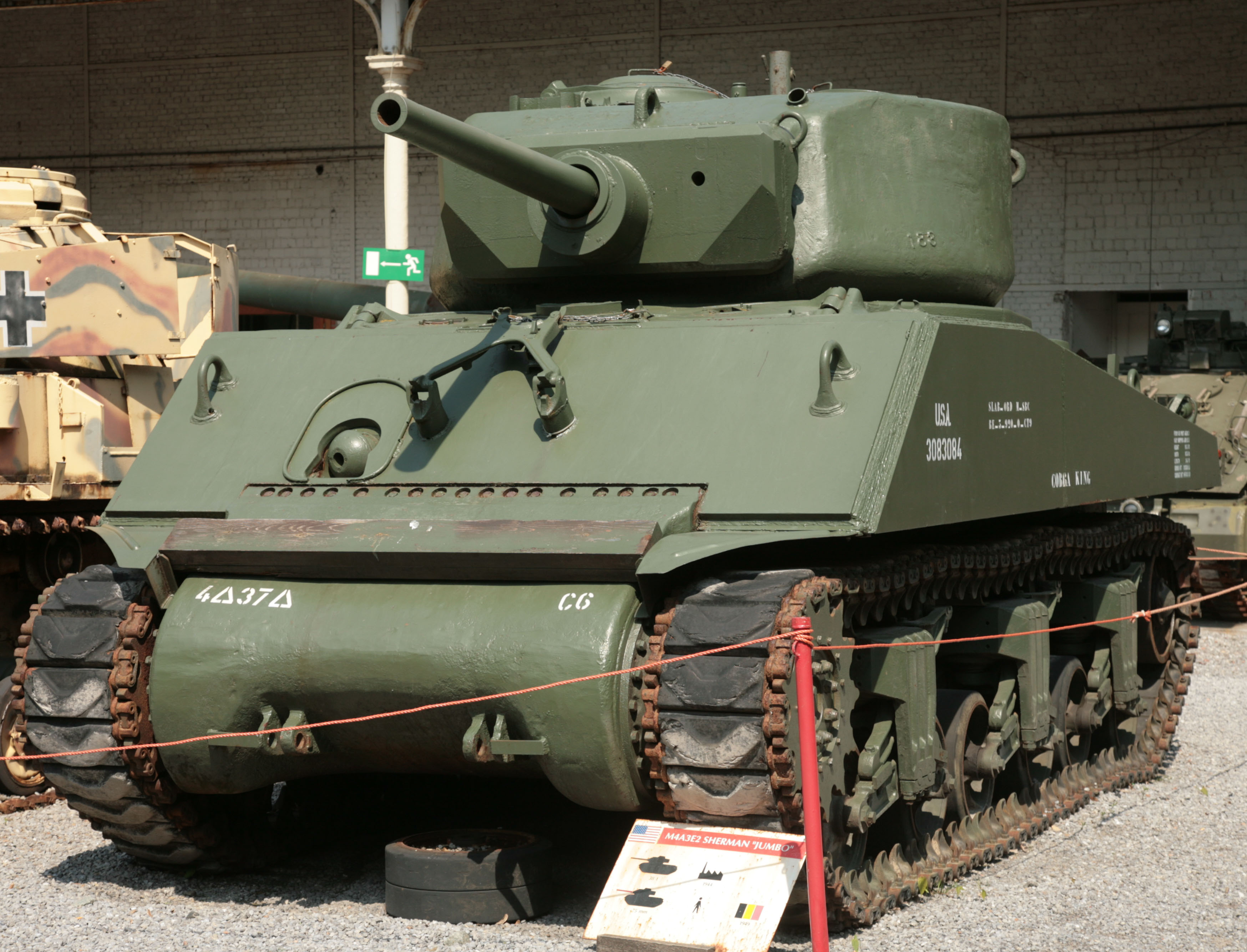
M4A3E2 "Jumbo" with an extra inch of cast armor in the frontal hull.

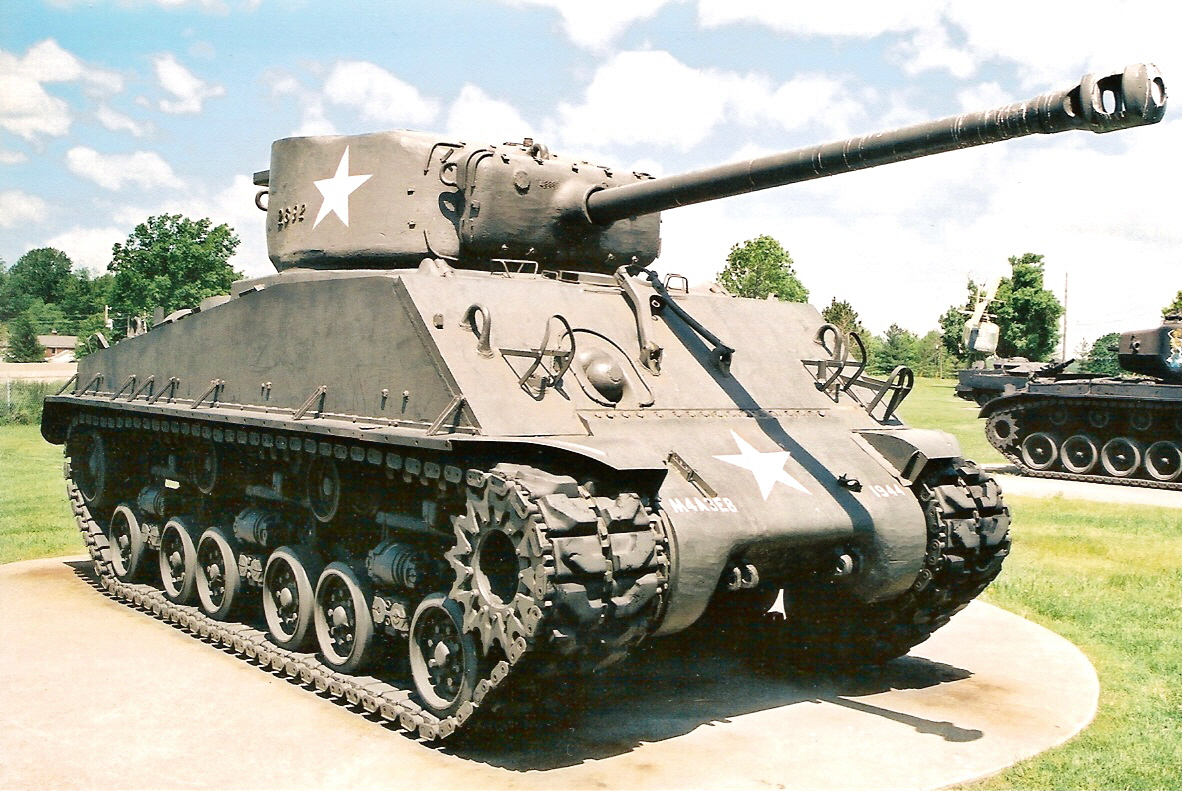
M4A3E8 "Easy Eight" at the Patton Museum of Cavalry and Armor, 2003.

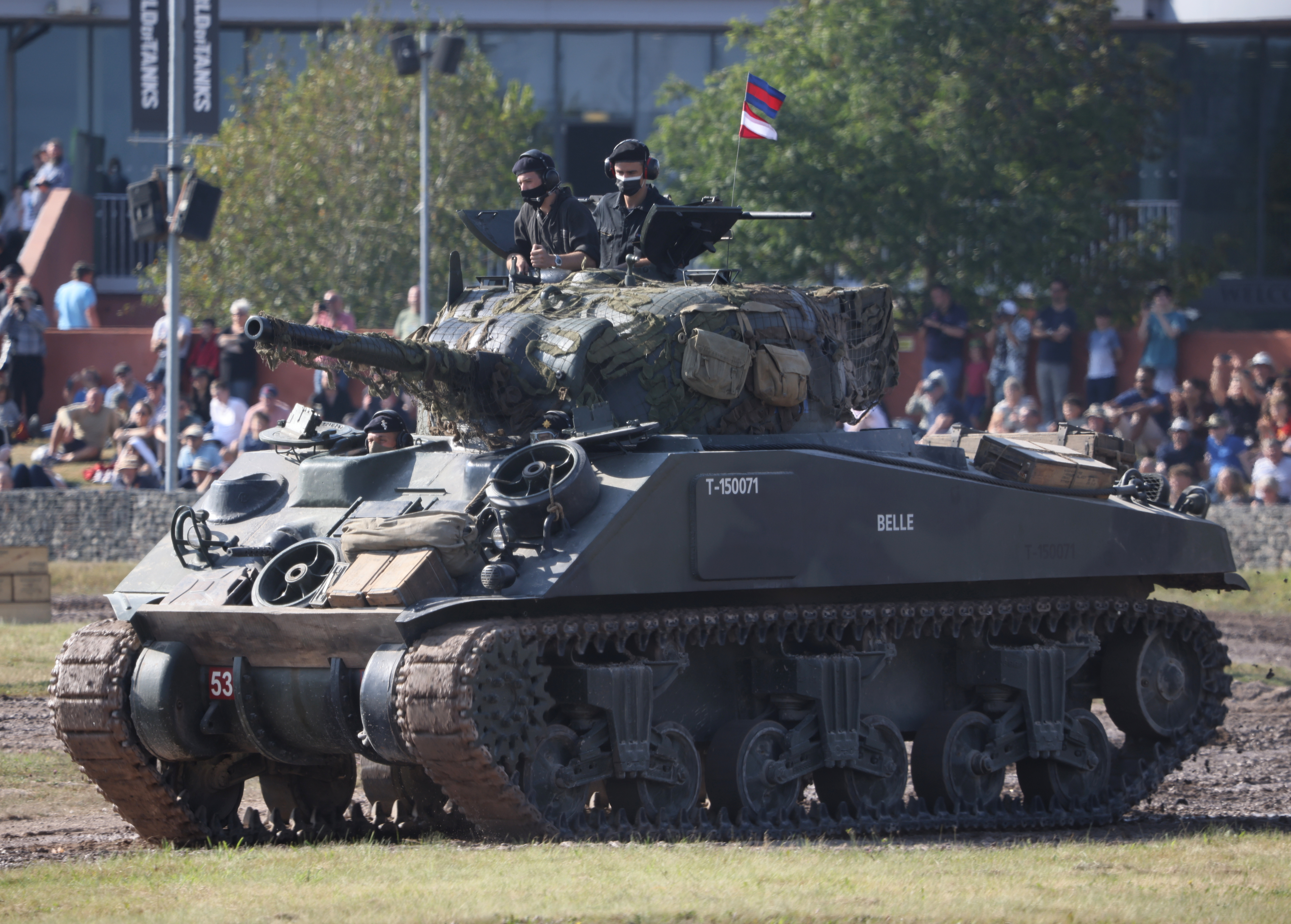
M4A4.

Over the course of production, a number of improvements in the design were introduced. The turret of T20/T23 prototypes with its 76mm gun was adapted to the Sherman and entered production in February 1944; M4 variants with this armament had the suffix "76mm" added to their designations. The use of the 105mm howitzer for equipping close support tanks occurred from 1943. In reaction to fires following penetrating hits, applique armor was added to the outside of the hull. This was followed by internal modification with "wet storage" jacketing the ammunition racks. Suspension was changed by the use of the stronger HVSS from mid-1944. HVSS had twice the number of wheels per bogie and individual wheels could be replaced without removing the bogie from the hull. Tracks were wider and vehicles had track covers that extended beyond the hull. Other hull modifications included a 47 degree angled glacis for simpler production, larger access hatches and a hatch for the loader and commander's cupola.

=== US M4 sub-types ===
M4
Continental R-975 radial engine; welded hull. 75mm cannon. Users: US, Britain, Poland, France.

M4 Composite – Later variation of the M4 that mated a cast front portion to the welded components of the rear hull.
M4(105) – Upgraded with a 105mm M4 Howitzer, designed for infantry support and assault, sacrificing anti-armor capability. 47° glacis with large drivers' hatches.
M4(105) HVSS – M4(105) with Horizontal volute spring suspension (HVSS).

M4A1
Continental radial engine; one-piece cast hull; 75mm cannon. The last M4A1 production units used a modified hull with large drivers' hatches. Users: US, Britain, South Africa, Poland(M4A1(76)W), France (small numbers).

M4A1(76)W – Upgraded with 76 mm M1 gun and large drivers' hatches.
M4A1(76)W HVSS – Upgraded with widetrack HVSS, fitted with the 76 mm M1 gun.
M4A1E9 – Late war remanufacturing featuring spaced out VVSS suspension, extended end connectors on both sides of the tracks. Some appeared in Europe before VE Day. Users: US, France, many postwar users.

M4A2
Diesel-powered with General Motors Twin G-41 Engine; 75mm cannon. Users: USSR, Britain, France, Poland, US (Army And Marines) Later production units of the M4A2 used the modified 47° glacis with large drivers' hatches - this was to make escaping the tank easier, with some being fitted with springs to assist in opening the hatch.

M4A2(76)W – Upgraded with the 76mm M1 gun and 47° glacis with large drivers' hatches. Users: USSR
M4A2(76)W HVSS – Upgraded with widetrack Horizontal Volute Spring Suspension (HVSS), fitted with the 76mm M1 gun. Users: USSR, Canada (post-WW2).
M4A2E4 – A prototype of the M4A2 featuring independent Torsion bar suspension and widened 24 in (61 cm) tracks. Work began in March 1943, with two prototypes ready in summer the same year, which were tested at Aberdeen Proving Grounds. The project was canceled due to the suspension proving unsatisfactory and field maintenance being too complex.

M4A3
Ford GAA V-8 engine; welded hull and one piece cast nose; both 75mm and 76mm cannons used. Initial production from June 1942 was by Ford with Grand Blanc taking over in February 1944. Users: US, France (small numbers), Nicaragua (small numbers). The M4A3 was the preferred US Army vehicle.

M4A3(75)D – M4A3 with 75mm M3 gun, earlier 57° glacis with "dry" ammunition storage. Manufactured by Ford Motor Company and reserved mostly for training units in the USA. After 1945, many were remanufactured and sent to ETO to make up shortages due to 1944 losses of M4 Mediums.
M4A3(75)W – M4A3 with 75mm M3 gun. 47° glacis with large drivers' hatches. Shifted ammunition lockers to hull floor in water-glycol jacketed lockers to decrease risk of fire, known as "wet stowage".
M4A3(75)W HVSS – Upgraded with widetrack HVSS
M4A3(76)W – a highly improved variant of the Sherman with 1,400 built by Detroit Arsenal and 525 by Grand Blanc. This model had improved armor, firepower, and a better gun with a higher velocity.
M4A3(76)W HVSS – M4A3 (76mm) with HVSS. 2,617 built by Detroit Arsenal. Nicknamed the "Easy Eight," from the E8 variation code identifying the HVSS suspension upgrade. This model remained in service well after 1945, seeing service in the Korean War and briefly in the Vietnam War.
M4A3(105) – M4A3 with 105mm howitzer used for infantry support. 500 built April-August 1944
M4A3(105) HVSS – Upgraded with widetrack HVSS
M4A3E2 Assault Tank – postwar nickname "Jumbo" – extra armor (including 1 inch on front, making it able to withstand shells from the German 88 millimeter guns), vertical sided turret, but about 3-4 mph slower at 22 mph. Built by Grand Blanc May-June 1944 with the T23 turret. Some rearmed with 76mm guns from damaged tanks. "Duckbill"-style extended end connectors (EECs) fitted to the outside edge of the tracks. Users: US, France (one vehicle)
M4A3E4 – some M4A3s originally built with the 75mm turret were field upgraded with the 76mm M1 gun for increased anti-armor capability. Not heavily pursued during WWII due to availability of other 76mm production tanks. The "E4" upgrade program was pursued by some postwar users of the M4A3 (75)W.

M4A4
Chrysler A57 multibank engine; welded, lengthened hull; 75-mm gun only as-built. Users: Britain, France, China, Lebanon (Firefly), Nicaragua (small numbers).

M4A4E1 – Two M4A4s with a 105mm howitzer on T70 mount for testing. Resulted in the M4E5 pilot vehicle.

M4A5
Designation assigned but not used for Canadian Ram tank.
M4A6
M4A4 hull with Caterpillar D200A turbocharged, air-cooled radial multi-fuel engine adapted from Wright G200; composite cast/welded hull lengthened similarly to the M4A4; 75mm gun only. Only 75 of this variant were built (October 1943 – February 1944) due to problems with engine supply and the decision to rationalize engines used; none were used in combat.

=== US Sherman-based vehicles ===
Variants without the M4 designation but built on the M4 medium chassis. (While some began on the M3 chassis, some subvariants were switched to the M4 chassis during production. These are the models listed here):

- 105 mm Howitzer Motor Carriage M7 – self-propelled 105 mm Howitzer Motor Carriage (HMC) based on the M3, M4 and later M4A3 (M7B1) Sherman chassis.
- 155 mm Gun Motor Carriage M12 – Self-propelled 155 mm Gun Motor Carriage (GMC).
  - Cargo Carrier M30 – Cargo carrier (an M12 with crew and ammunition space in lieu of the gun).
- 155 mm Gun Motor Carriage M40 – Self-propelled 155 mm GMC (either an M1A1 or M2 gun) based on the M4A3 (HVSS) chassis.
- 8-inch Howitzer Motor Carriage M43 – Self-propelled 8 inch HMC (standardized post-World War II).
- 3-inch Gun Motor Carriage M10 – Tank destroyer based on the M4A2 Sherman chassis.
  - M10A1 – Same as the M10, but based on the M4A3 Sherman chassis.
- 90 mm Gun Motor Carriage M36 – Tank destroyer based on M10A1 hull (M4A3 chassis); standard model.
  - M36B1 – tank destroyer based on M4A3 Sherman hull and chassis; expedient model.
  - M36B2 – tank destroyer based on M10 hull (M4A2 chassis, diesel); expedient model.

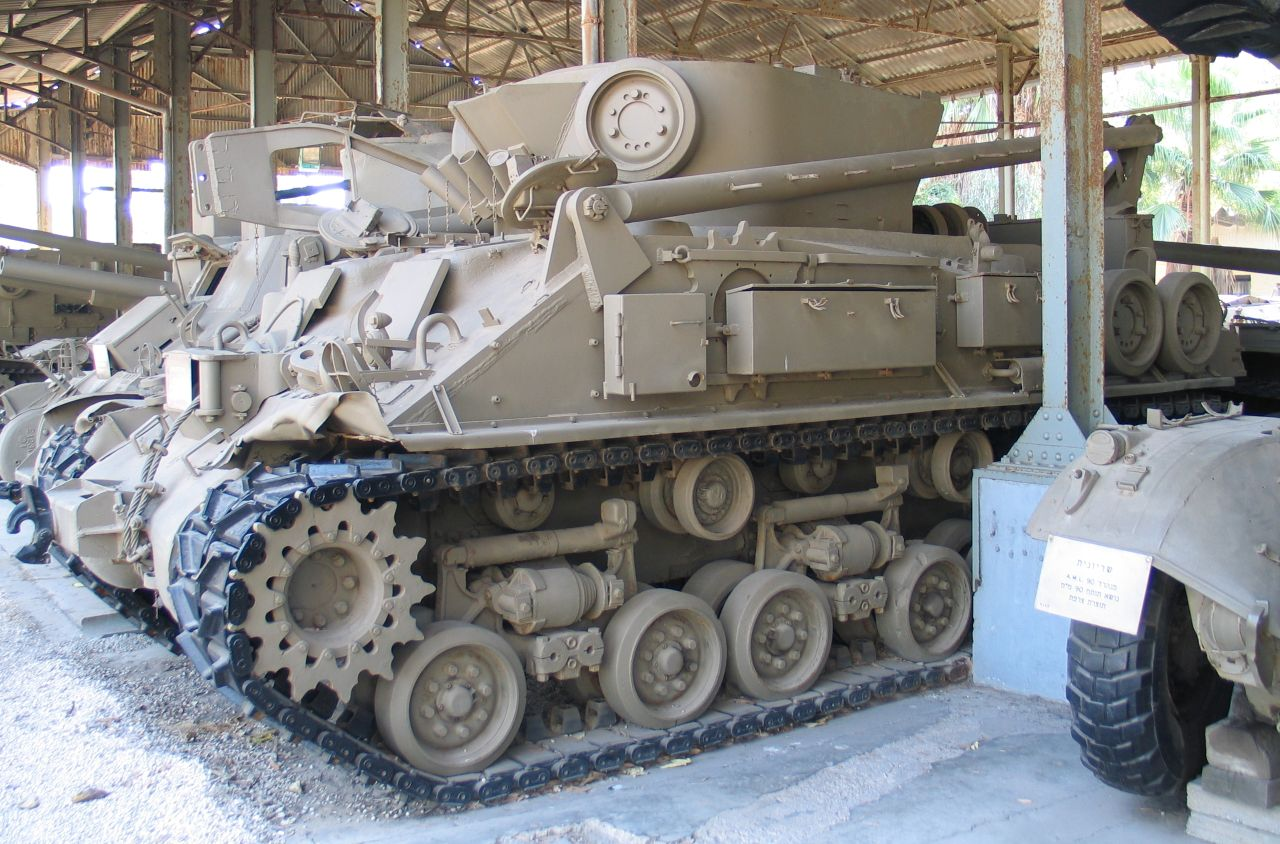
M32A3B1 TRV

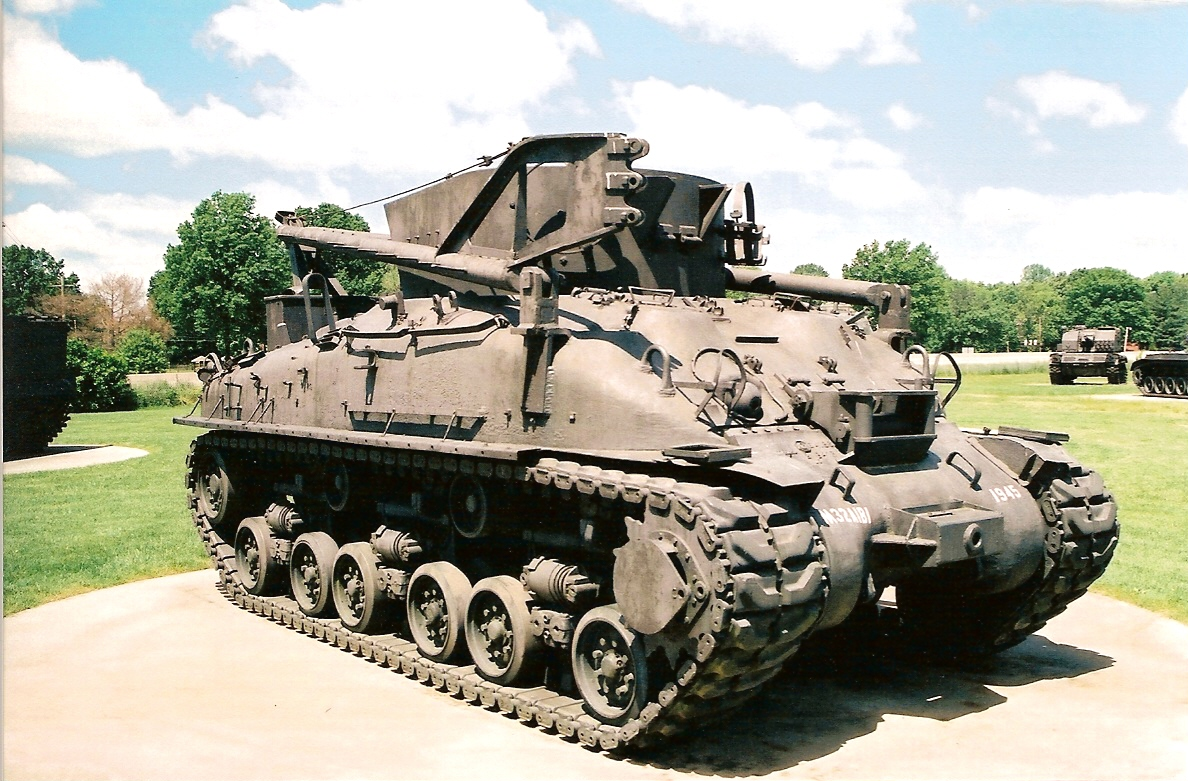
M32A1B1 armored recovery vehicle at the Patton Museum, 2003

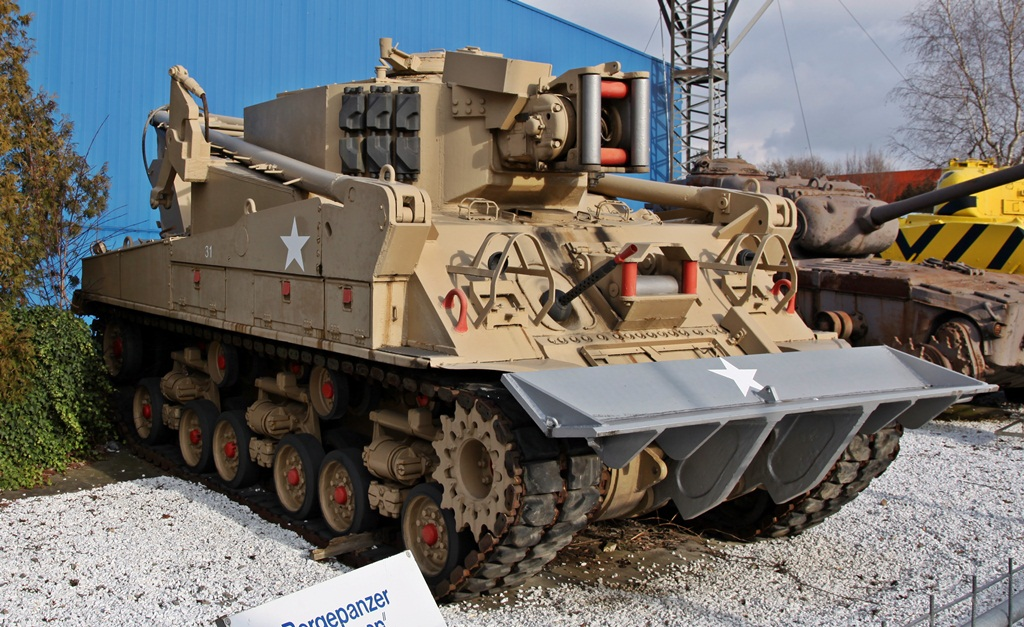
M74 tank recovery vehicle

- Tank Recovery Vehicle M32 – Based on M4 chassis with turret and gun replaced by fixed turret. Equipped with 60,000 lb (27,000 kg) winch and an 18 feet long pivoting A-frame jib installed. An 81mm mortar was also added into the hull, primarily for screening purposes.
  - M32B1 – M32s converted from M4A1s.
    - M32A1B1 – M32B1s with HVSS, later removing the 81mm Mortar and incorporating crane improvements.
  - M32B2 – M32s converted from M4A2s.
  - M32B3 – M32s converted from M4A3s.
    - M32A1B3 – M32B3s brought to the same standard as the M32A1B1.
  - M32B4 – M32s converted from M4A4s.
- Tank Recovery Vehicle M74 – Upgrade of the M32 to provide the same capability with regards to heavier post-war tanks, converted from M4A3 HVSS tanks. In appearance, the M74 is very similar to the M32, fitted with an A-Frame crane, a main towing winch, an auxiliary winch, and a manual utility winch. The M74 also has a front-mounted spade that can be used as a support or as a dozer blade.
  - M74B1 – Same as the M74, but converted from M32B3s.
- Prime Mover M34 – M32B1 TRV converted to an artillery tractor for heavy guns. 24 vehicles were converted by Chester Tank Depot in 1944.
- Prime Mover M35 – M10A1 Gun Motor Carriage converted to an artillery tractor for 240 mm howitzers.

Experimental

- Demolition Tank T31 – Experimental vehicle. Turret with a false 105 mm howitzer barrel and single 7.2 inch rocket projector T94 (with a five-cylinder rotating mechanism) each side of a turret, mounted on an M4A3 HVSS chassis.
- Flame Thrower Tank T33 – Experimental flame tank. A heavily modified M4A3E2 with HVSS suspension, a modified turret using a lighter 75 mm M6 gun with an E20-20 flamethrower gun in a fake barrel mounted next to the main gun, and an E21R4 flamethrower mounted on the commander's cupola with a 240° traverse range.
- Multiple Gun Motor Carriage T52 – Single 40 mm autocannon with twin 0.5-inch machine guns in a ball shaped oscillating turret on an M4 chassis. Project stopped in October 1944 after trials.
- 90mm Gun Motor Carriage T53/T53E1 – 90mm gun mounted on an M4A4 chassis. Design modified for dual anti-tank and anti-aircraft use as T53E1 with outriggers for stability. Order for 500 cancelled in 1944 after design rejected by both Tank Destroyer and AA branch of US Army.
- 155mm Mortar Motor Carriage T90 -

=== US Special Attachment variants ===
Rocket-firing, flame-thrower, mine-clearing, amphibious, engineer; mostly experimental (indicated by T instead of M).

- Rhino – more formally "M4 with Cullin Hedgerow Device". Sherman tanks fitted with prongs to the front of the hull. Used during battle of Normandy for breaking through bocage hedgerows. Attached to many subtypes.
- Sherman DD (Duplex drive) – Amphibious M4 Variant produced by US and British shops using M4A1, M4A2 and M4A4 donor vehicles.
- Sherman Firefly – About 2,000 M4s (Firefly IC) and M4A4s (Firefly VC) were re-armed by the British in 1944 with their 17-pounder (76.2 mm) guns as the Sherman Firefly. Users: Britain, Poland, Canada. In late 1944, 88 M4s and M4A3s were upgraded with the 17-pounder gun at the request of the US Army, a small handful being issued the Italian theater.
- M4 Mobile Assault Bridge – Field modification of the M4 to move double-track bridges.

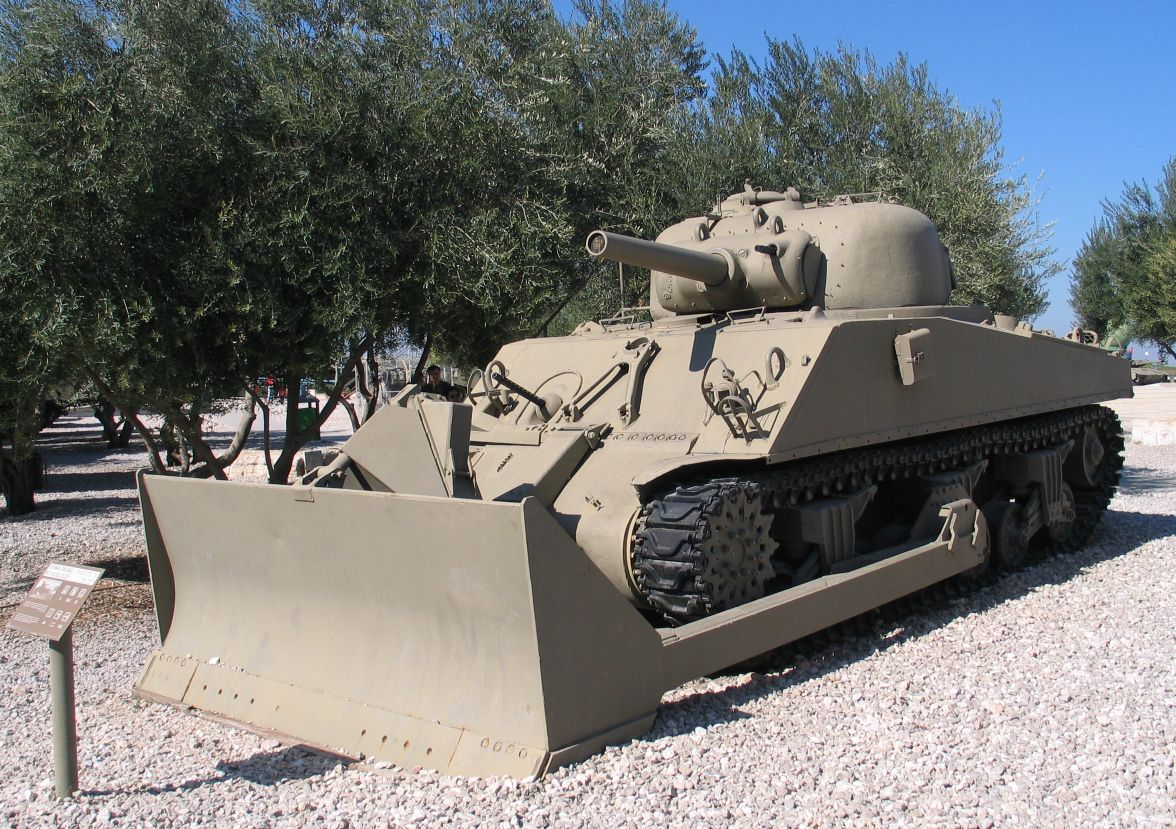
M4A3(105) with an M1 dozer blade.

- M4 Dozer – fitted with M1 (side arm) or M2 (hydraulic mount) dozer blade. Some tanks had their turrets removed.
- Mine exploders / mine excavators (Note: Fitted with various mine exploding devices including plungers, rollers, mortars. Most of those remained experimental vehicles.)
  - Mine Exploder T1 Roller (Note: Technically, there was no T1 Roller. The series started with the T1E1 Roller.) – Series of mine rollers.
    - T1E1 (Earthworm) – Roller discs made from armor plate. Used with M32 TRV.
    - T1E2 – Two forward units with 7 roller discs only. Experimental.
    - T1E3 (Aunt Jemima) – Two forward units with five 10 ft (3.0 m) discs. Most widely used T1 variant, adopted as the Mine Exploder M1 Roller. 75 built.
      - T1E5 – T1E3 with smaller wheels. Experimental.
      - T1E6 – T1E3 with serrated edged roller discs. Experimental.
    - T1E4 – 16 roller discs.

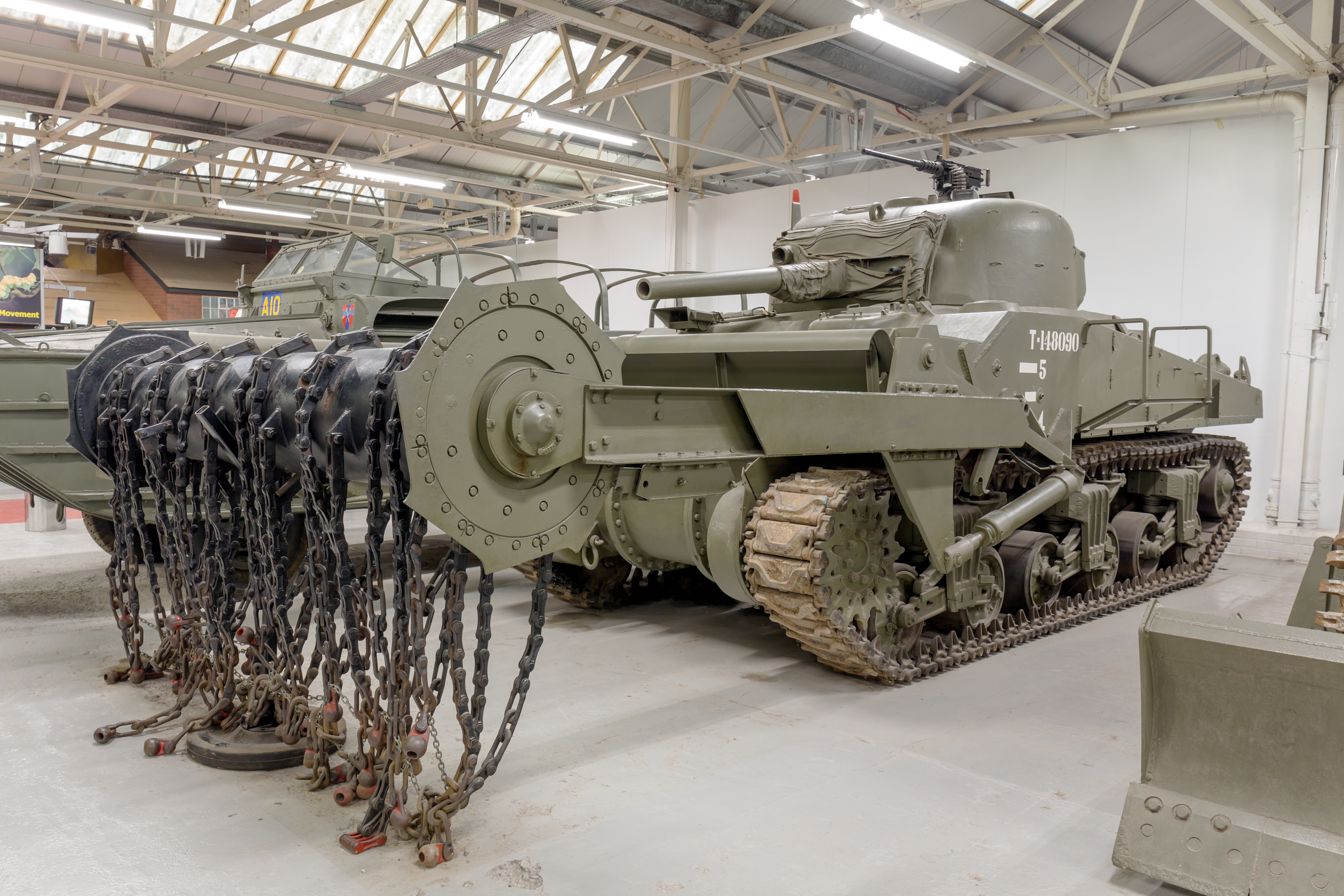
M4A4 Sherman Crab Mk I.

  - Mine Exploder T2 Flail – American designation for British Sherman Crab I mine flail.
  - Mine Exploder T3 Flail – Based on British Scorpion flail. Development stopped in 1943.
    - T3E1 – T3 with longer arms and sand filled rotor. Cancelled.
      - T3E2 – E1 variant, rotor replaced with steel drum of larger diameter. Development terminated at war's end.
  - Mine Exploder T4 – British Crab II mine flail.
  - Mine Exploder T7 – Frame with small rollers with two discs each. Abandoned.
  - Mine Exploder T8 (Johnny Walker) – Steel plungers on a pivot frame designed to pound on the ground. Vehicle steering was adversely affected.
  - Mine Exploder T9 – 6' Roller. Difficult to maneuver.
    - T9E1 – Lightened version, but proved unsatisfactory because it jack-knifed and failed to explode all mines.
  - Mine Exploder T10 – Remote control unit designed to be controlled by the following tank. Cancelled.
  - Mine Exploder T11 – 6 forward firing spigot mortars to set off mines. Experimental.
  - Mine Exploder T12 – 23 forward firing spigot mortars. Apparently effective, but cancelled.
  - Mine Exploder T14 – Direct modification to a Sherman tank, upgraded belly armor and reinforced tracks. Cancelled.
  - Mine Exploder T15/E1/E2 – Series of mine resistant Shermans based on the T14 kit. Cancelled at war's end.
  - Mine Excavator T4 – Plough device. Developed during 1942, but abandoned.
  - Mine Excavator T5 – T4 variant with v-shaped plough.
    - T5E1 – Further improvement of the T5.
    - T5E2 – Further improvement of the T5.
      - T5E3 – T5E1/E2 rigged to the hydraulic lift mechanism from the M1 dozer kit to control depth.
  - Mine Excavator T6 – Based on the v-shape/T5, unable to control depth.
  - Mine Excavator T2 – Based on the T4/T5's, but rigged to the hydraulic lift mechanism from the M1 dozer kit to control depth.
    - T2E1 – Further improvement of the T2.
    - T2E2 – Further improvement of the T2.

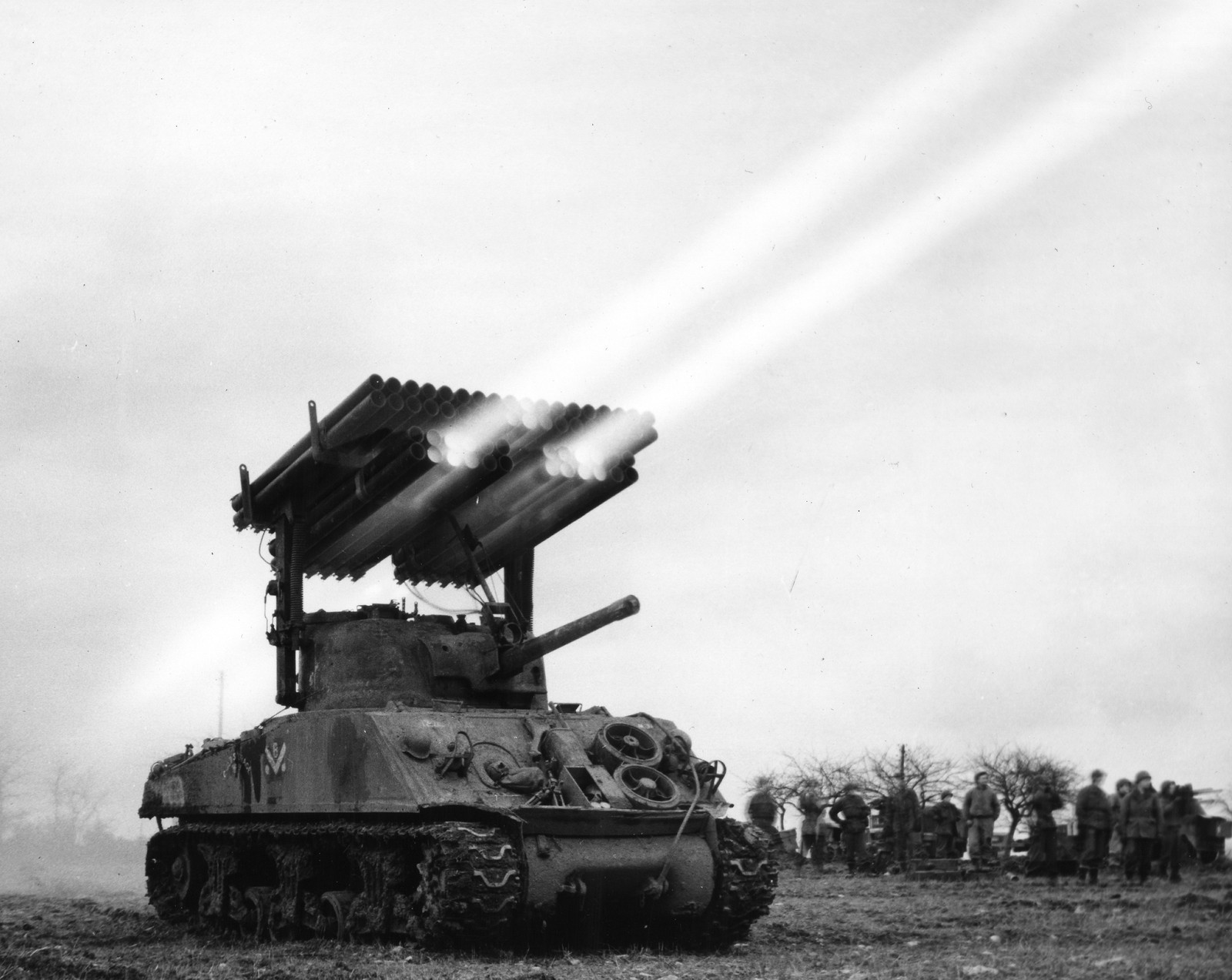
T34 Calliope Rocket launcher in France.

- Rocket launcher attachments:
  - Rocket Launcher T34 (Calliope) – 60 4.6" rocket tubes in a frame that could be mounted above the M4 turret. Saw limited combat from August 1944 up to end of war.
    - T34E1 – T34 with 14 tubes instead of 12 in the bottom two units of frame.
    - T34E2 – T34 modified to accept 7.2" rockets. Limited use in 1945
  - Rocket Launcher T39 – Enclosed box mount with doors, with 20 7.2" rockets.
  - Rocket Launcher T40 (M17 Whizbang) – Armed with 20 7.2" demolition rockets in a box frame. Saw limited combat in 1944-45. A short variant of the T40 on M4A2 with 75mm gun removed was also developed, but saw little usage.
  - Rocket Launcher T72 – Very short tube derivative of T34. Never used.
  - Rocket Launcher T73 – Similar to the T40, but with only 10 tubes on M4A1. Never used.
  - Rocket Launcher T76 – A 7.2" rocket tube launcher installed in place of the 75 or 105 mm main gun on Engineer Armored Vehicle conversions, which could be reloaded from inside the tank. The T76 was installed on a M4A1.
    - T76E1 – Designation for same weapon mounted on a M4A3(105) HVSS.
  - Rocket Launcher T105 – M4A1 with A 7.2" rocket case instead of main gun developed from T76. Never used.
  - Multiple Rocket Launcher T99 – two box mounts each with 22 4.5" rockets, mounted either side of turret. Never used.

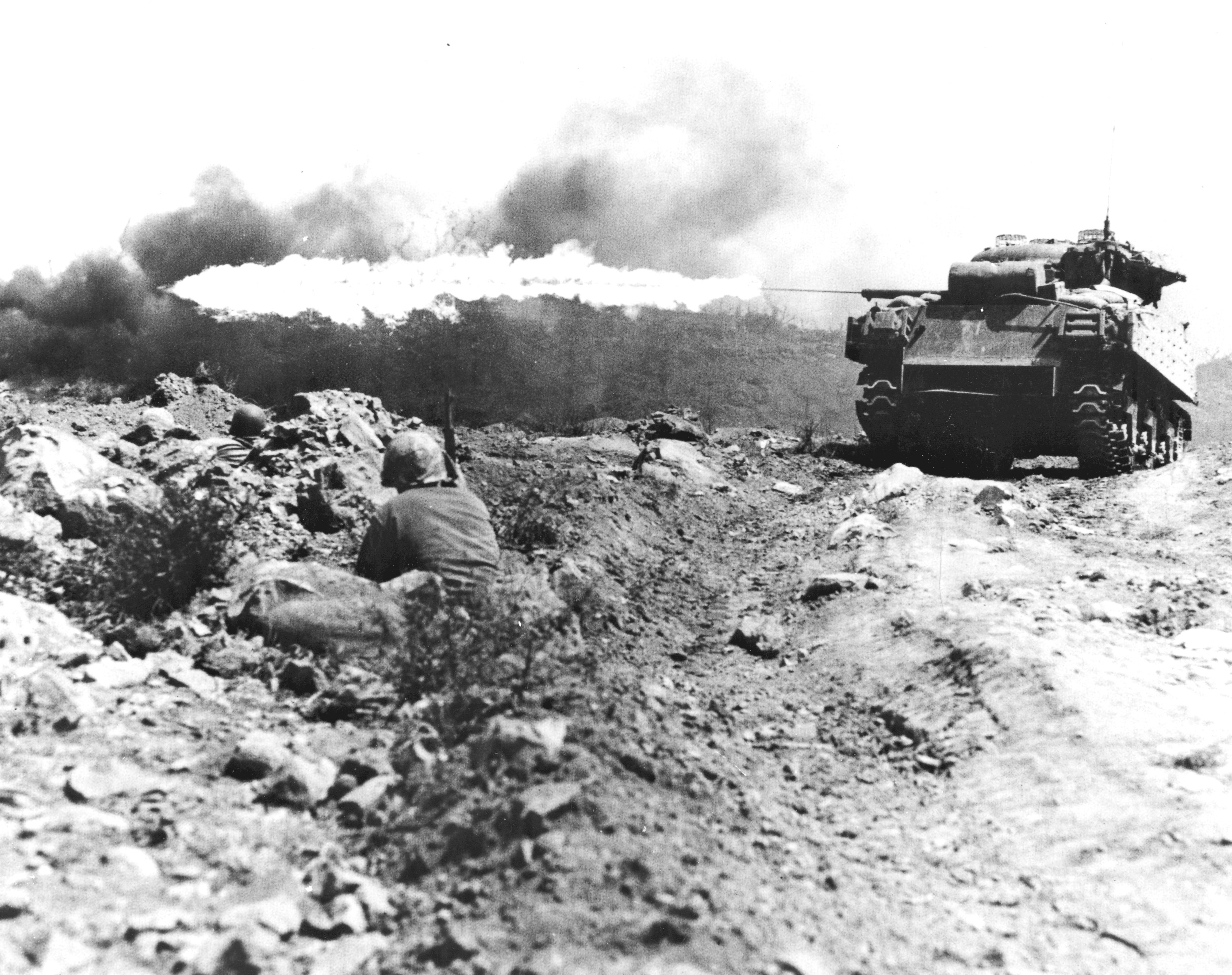
A M4A3R3 used by the USMC during the Battle of Iwo Jima.

- Flame throwers:
  - Flame Thrower Tank M42 – M4 Sherman tanks equipped a M5-4 Mechanized Flame Thrower in place of their main gun. 151 M42B1 (based on M4A1) and 49 M42B3 (based on M4A3) were built.
  - M4A3R5 (USMC designation, US Army various designations) – M4s field modified by Chemical Warfare Service Flame Tank Group with flamethrowers for use in Pacific theater.
  - M4 Sherman Crocodile – M4 tank modified with the flamethrower and fuel trailer from a Churchill Crocodile. Four built and issued to 739th Tank Battalion, which was attached to the 29th Division for Operation Grenade in February 1945, where they cleared the Old Citadel in the town of Jülich. After the Rhine had been crossed, they were attached to 2nd Armored Division but saw little further use.

== Lend-Lease service ==
The M4 Sherman series were widely distributed to allied armies under the Lend-Lease program. Variants served in all theaters, and were the basis of a number of conversions for various uses, including armored personnel carriers and specialized engineering vehicles.

(The Sherman Beach Armoured Recovery Vehicle goes under this due to its being a British M4 sherman variant)

== Post-war variants ==
The M4 Sherman pattern enjoyed a lengthy post-war service all over the world. They were used well into the 1970s by some nations, mainly in Africa and Latin America. In some cases, the vehicles were converted for use to a variety of other roles from mobile artillery to ambulances. Conversions were also made for use in civilian industry.

There were two common civilian industrial conversions in Canada. The Finning Corporation introduced a shortened chassis with a powerful hydraulic rock drill, which was able to navigate very rough terrain for road construction. The Madill Corporation found a ready market for a range of logging equipment using converted Sherman chassis. Perhaps the most spectacular were spar yarders with an extensible mast with various winches and cables to haul heavy logs up steep slopes.
