= Model 32 =

Model 32 (M32), Model 1832, Model 1932 (M-1932), or variation, may refer to:

== Military ==
=== Model 32 (M32) ===
- M32 MGL, a multiple grenade launcher
- M32 tank recovery vehicle, a variant of the M4 Sherman tank
- Bofors 25 mm M/32, Swedish anti-aircraft artillery
- Czechoslovak M32 helmet
- Consolidated Model 32 airplane; the B-24 Liberator bomber

=== Model 1832 ===
a.k.a. "Model 32"/"M-32"

- Model 1832 foot artillery sword (U.S. Army)
- Model 1832 Army foot officers' sword (U.S. Army), see List of individual weapons of the U.S. Armed Forces
- Model 1832 Army general & staff officers' sword (U.S. Army), see List of individual weapons of the U.S. Armed Forces
- Model 1832 Army medical staff officers' sword (U.S. Army), see List of individual weapons of the U.S. Armed Forces

=== Model 1932 (M-1932) ===
a.k.a. "Model 32"/"M-32"

- BT-2 Model 1932 (USSR) a Soviet tank
- T-26 model 1932 (USSR) a Soviet tank
- 45 mm anti-tank gun M1932 (19-K), a Soviet field gun
- Mauser M1932 / M712 Schnellfeuer, a German select-fire pistol
- Weibel M/1932, a Danish machine gun

== Non-military ==
- Curtiss Model 32 airplane
- Rutan Model 32 Variviggen SP airplane

== See also ==
- 180mm Pattern 1932 (USSR) Soviet naval artillery, see 180mm Pattern 1931-1933
- M32 (disambiguation)
- Model (disambiguation)
- 32 (disambiguation)
