= M32 =

M32 may refer to:

== Roads ==
- M32 motorway, a motorway in Bristol, England
- M-32 (Michigan highway), a state highway traversing northern lower Michigan from the town of East Jordan to the city of Alpena
- M32 (Cape Town), a Metropolitan Route in Cape Town, South Africa
- M32 (Johannesburg), a Metropolitan Route in Johannesburg, South Africa
- M32 (Durban), a Metropolitan Route in Durban, South Africa

== Other uses ==
- M32 (catamaran), a lightweight, high-performance, multihull sailing vessel
- Messier 32, an elliptical galaxy in the constellation Andromeda
- M32 MGL, a multiple grenade launcher
- M32 tank recovery vehicle, a variant of the M4 Sherman tank
- HMS M32, an M29-class monitor warship of the Royal Navy
- Samsung Galaxy M32, an Android-based smartphone
- M32 helmet, Czechoslovak army steel helmet
