= M74 armored recovery vehicle =

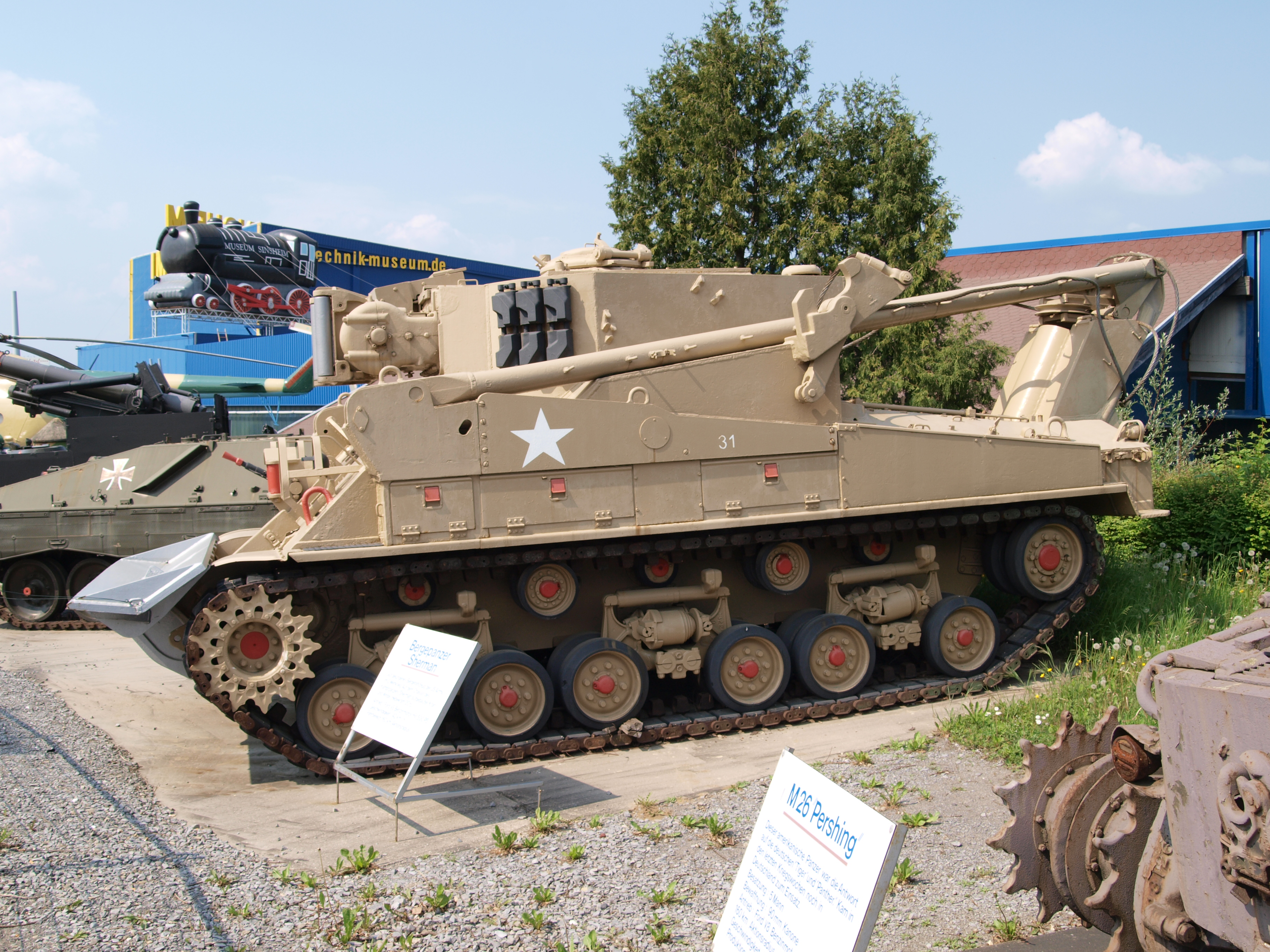
- A M74 in the Sinsheim Museum
- Type: Armored recovery vehicle
- Place of origin: United States

Service history
- Used by: United States; Belgium; Spain; Portugal; Yugoslavia; Greece

Production history
- Designer: Bowen-McLaughlin-York
- Designed: 1953
- Manufacturer: Bowen-McLaughlin-York
- Developed from: M32 tank recovery vehicle
- Unit cost: M74B1 - $45,000 for conversion
- Produced: 1953-1958
- No. built: 1126
- Variants: M74, M71B1

Specifications
- Mass: 42.5 tons
- Length: 7.95 m (26 ft 1 in)
- Width: 3.10 m (10 ft 2 in)
- Height: 3.11 m (10 ft 2 in)
- Crew: 4
- Armor: 108 mm maximum
- Main armament: 1× .50 caliber Browning M2HB machine gun 1× .30 caliber Browning M1919A4 machine gun
- Engine: Ford GAA V-8 gasoline engine 450 hp
- Power/weight: 10.6 hp/tonne
- Transmission: Synchromesh transmission (5 forward and 1 reverse gears)
- Suspension: Horizontal volute spring suspension (HVSS)
- Fuel capacity: 168 U.S. gallons (636 litres)
- Operational range: 160 km
- Maximum speed: 34 km/h (21 mph)

The tank recovery vehicle M74 (M74) was an engineer vehicle used by the U.S. Army in the 1950s. It was designed to cope with the heavier weights of the M26 Pershing and M47 Patton. It could also be suitable for light dozing, since it had a hydraulic, front-mounted spade. 1126 were produced by Bowen-McLaughlin-York by converting M4A3 Sherman tanks starting in 1954. From 1956, 60 M32B3A1s were converted by Rock Island Arsenal until 1958.

== Development ==
After the Korean War the M74 was designed to cope with the heavier weights of the new vehicles that were being introduced.

Designed in 1953, it was based on the M4A3 HVSS medium tank and it was developed to cope with the heavier M26 Pershing and M47 Patton tanks which were entering service, which the M32 armoured recovery vehicle (ARV) was unable to retrieve. Using the standard Ford GAA and HVSS suspension the chassis would be rebuilt. It was replaced in service with the U.S. Army by the M88 Hercules.

== Design ==
The M74 was fitted with a main 60,000 lb (27,000 kg) hydraulic winch, a lighter-duty general purpose secondary winch, a hydraulic A-frame, and a hydraulic front-mounted spade, which was suitable for light dozing, as well as serving as an anchor for heavy winching operations. It had a .50-caliber M2 machine gun atop the hull and a .30-cal M1919A4 machine gun in the right bow.

== Variants ==
The M74B1 was a M32B3 HVSS converted to M74B1.

== Production ==
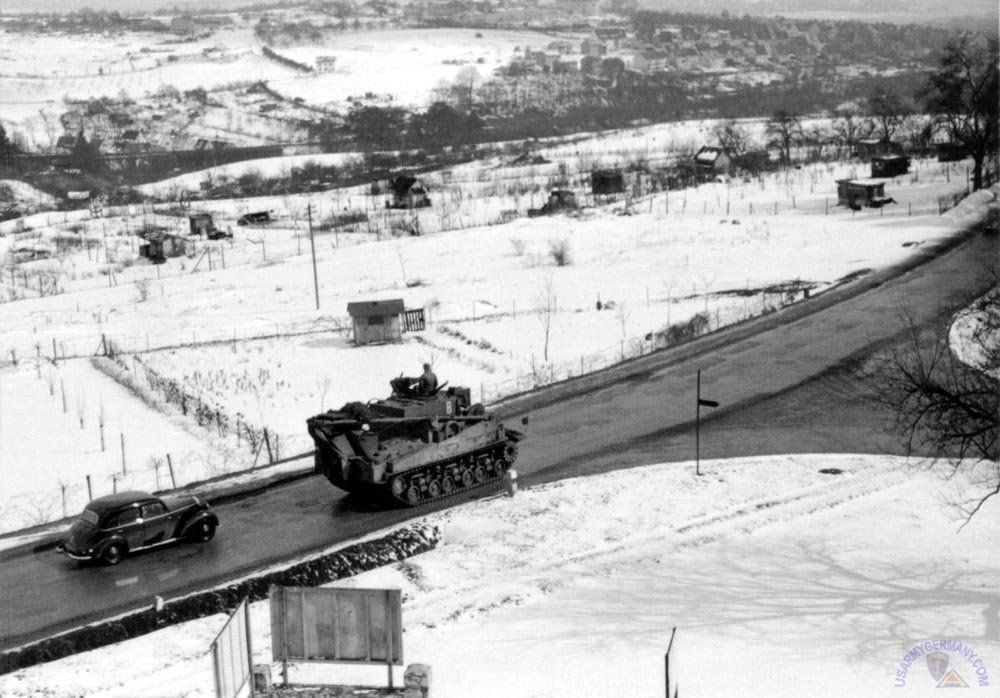
A M74 near Ulm, Germany, in 1954

1126 M74 ARVs were produced between 1953 and 1955 by Bowen-McLaughlin-York. The conversion of M4A3 Sherman tanks into M74 recovery vehicles was started by Bowen in 1954. Some were also converted from obsolete M32A1B3 by Rock Island Arsenal until 1958.

== Operators ==
- United States – Used in post-World War II Germany. It was the standard recovery vehicle of the U.S. Army in the 1950s.
- Belgium - Used in 1954-198x, 56 in 1976
- Germany
- Greece
- Spain – Lent by the United States from 1953 to 1968.
- Portugal – Operated 13 units, probably from the United States, were replaced in the 1980s by 8 M88A1/A2G.
- Turkey
- Yugoslavia - some received during the Informbiro period

== See also ==
- List of U.S. military vehicles by model number
- List of U.S. military vehicles by supply cataloge designation (SNL G281)
- M4 Sherman variants
