= Chrysler A57 multibank =

Chrysler A57 Multibank
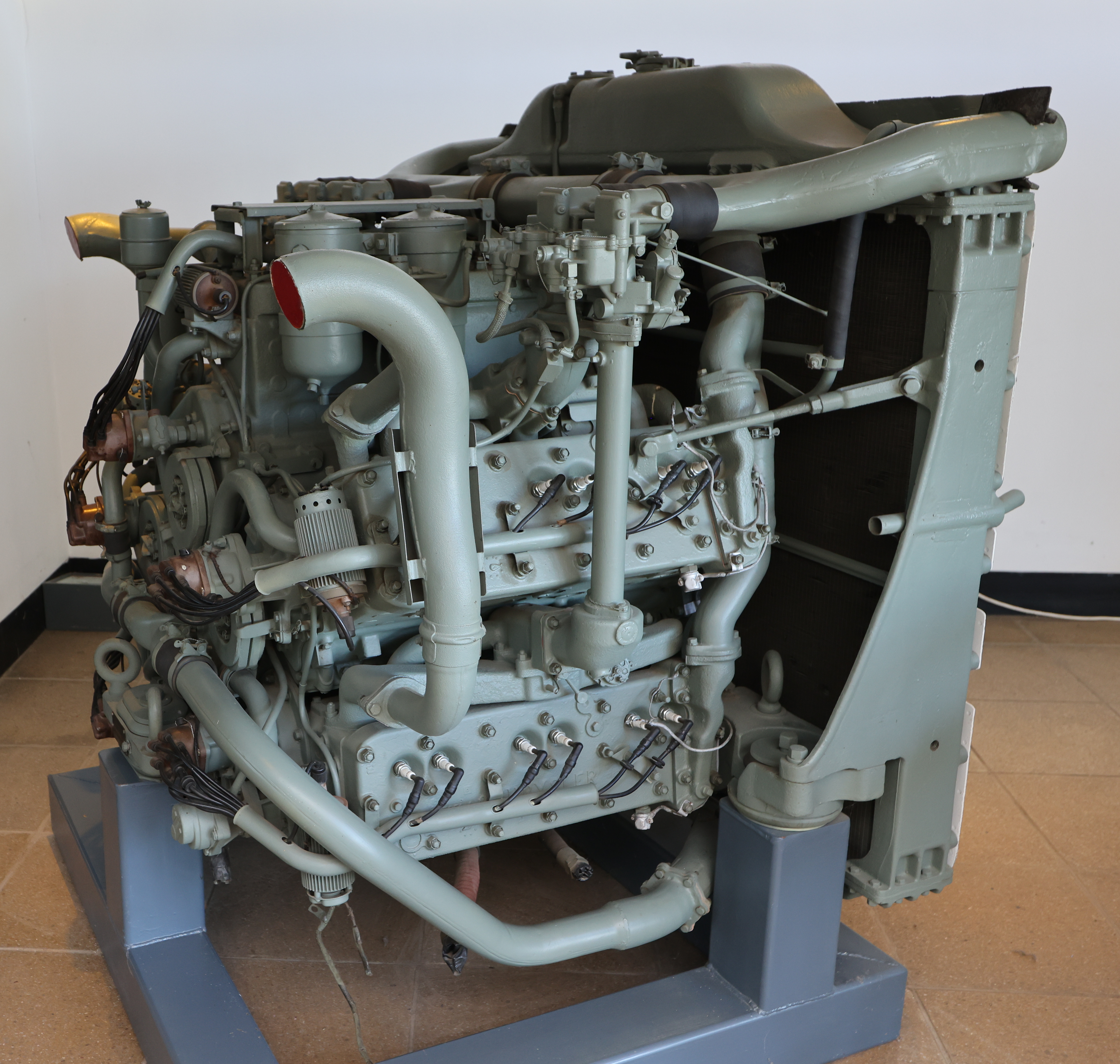

Overview
- Manufacturer: Chrysler

Layout
- Configuration: Multibank (5-bank W30)
- Displacement: 1,253 cu in (20.5 L)
- Cylinder bore: 3.4375 in (87 mm)
- Piston stroke: 4.5 in (114 mm)
- Compression ratio: 6.2:1

Combustion
- Fuel system: Naturally aspirated, Carter TD-1 carburetors
- Fuel type: Gasoline
- Cooling system: Liquid

Output
- Power output: 370 hp (276 kW) @ 2400 rpm

The Chrysler A57 Multibank is a 30-cylinder 1,253 cu in (20.5 L) engine that was created in 1941 as America entered World War II. It consists of five banks of inline-6 cylinder engines.

== History ==
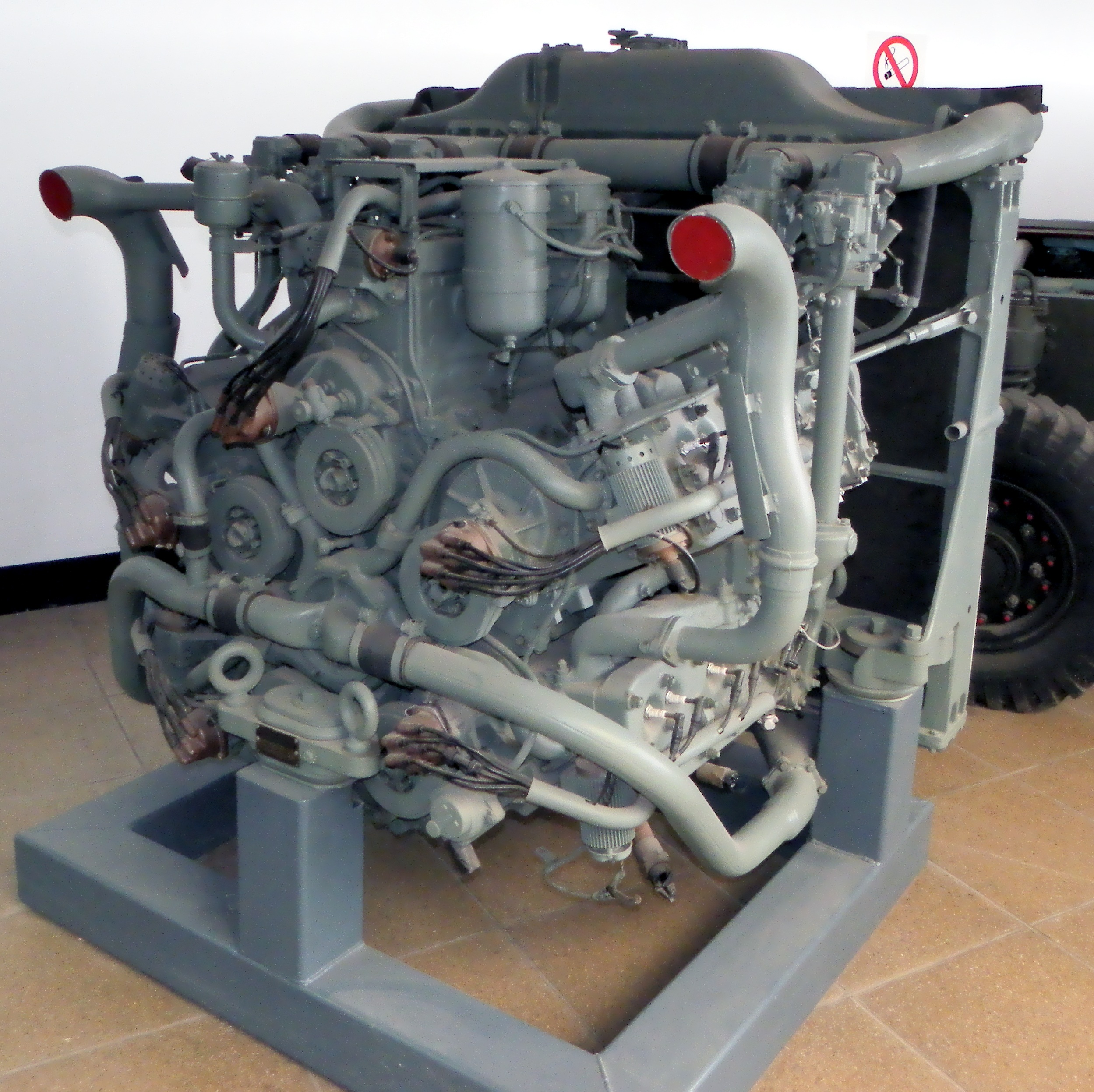
Chrysler multibank

It was born out of the necessity for a rear-mounted tank engine to be developed and produced in the shortest time possible for use in the M3A4 Lee medium tank and its successor M4A4 Sherman medium tank. Each had lengthened hulls to accommodate the A57.

In order to use existing tooling, five 250.6 cu in (4.1 L) Chrysler flathead engines (bore 3.4375 in or 87 mm, stroke 4.5 in or 114 mm) were arranged around a central shaft, producing a unique 30-cylinder 21-litre (1,253 cu in) engine in a relatively compact but heavy package.

A total of 109 Lees and 7,499 Shermans were fitted with the A57. The M4A4 was largely supplied to the British, the US preferring the M4A3 with the more conventional Ford GAA V8 engine, and restricting their M4A4s to overseas use.

== Design ==
The combined assembly consisted of five of these straight-six engines mounted in a pseudo-radial fashion upon a central cast-iron crankcase. The arrangement employed a common radiator, water pump, oil pan & dual oil pumps, with each of the five component crankshafts fitted with a geared flywheel that meshed with a central sun gear driving a main shaft running through the central crankcase. Each of the six-cylinder sub-blocks had an iron head and featured a Carter TD-1 carburetor and a 6.2:1 compression ratio, with tuned pipes that fed into a common exhaust; output was 370 hp (280 kW) at 2400 rpm.

This large engine assembly necessitated a longer hull (same as the M4A6), becoming the M4A4; most of these were supplied to Allied countries under Lend-Lease.

In the February 1944 issue of the magazine Popular Science, an advertisement by Chrysler claimed the A57 could still move the tank it was fitted in even if 12 out of its 30 cylinders were knocked out.

== Preservation ==
Examples of the engine have been preserved at the Walter P. Chrysler Museum in the United States and at the Imperial War Museum Duxford in the United Kingdom. The Tank Museum in Dorset, England, has a complete A57. An operational M4A4 Sherman tank is part of the Wheels of Liberation Collection in Gettysburg, Pennsylvania.
