= Czechoslovak M32 helmet =

Model 1932 Steel Combat Helmet

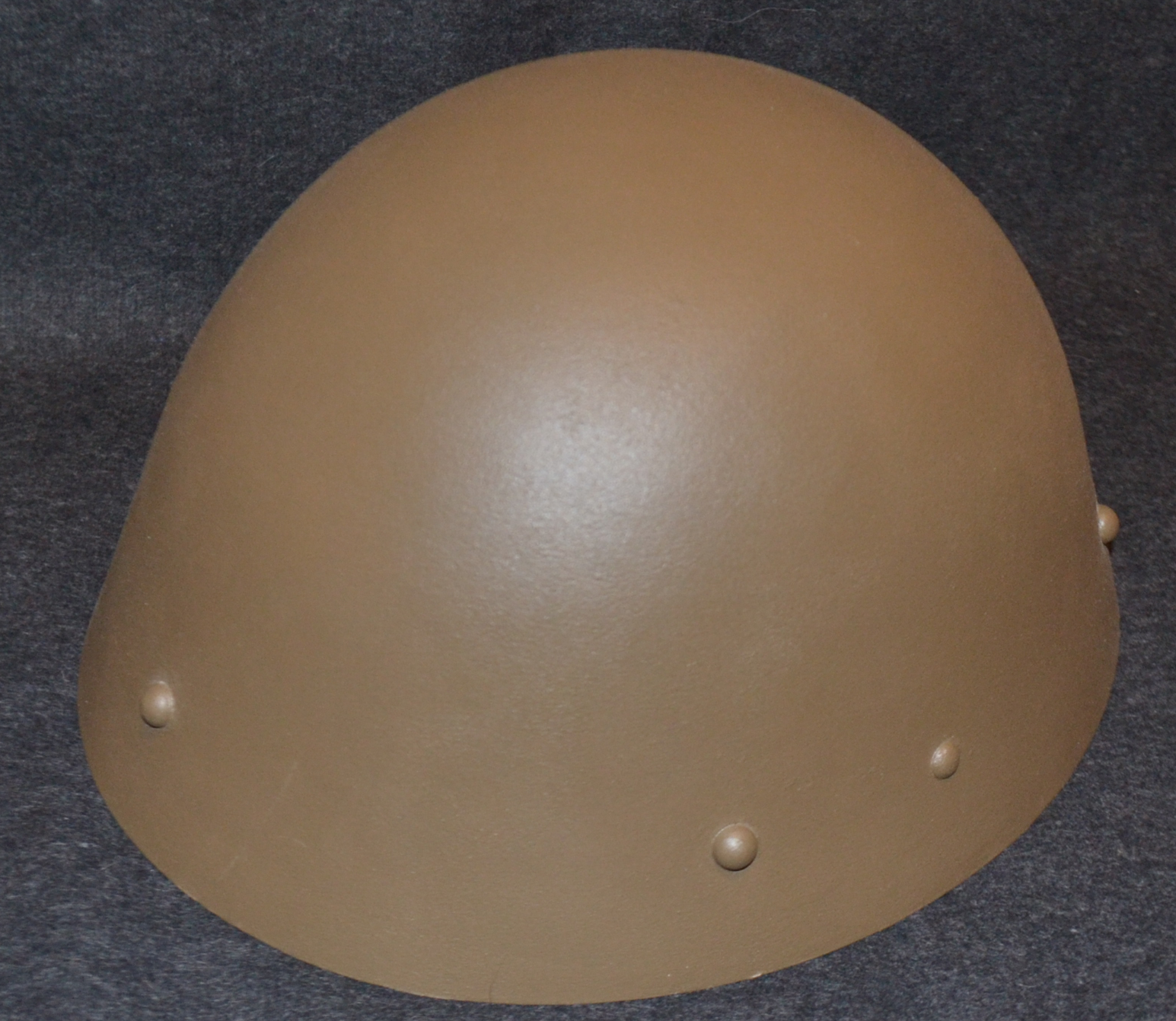
M32 helmet

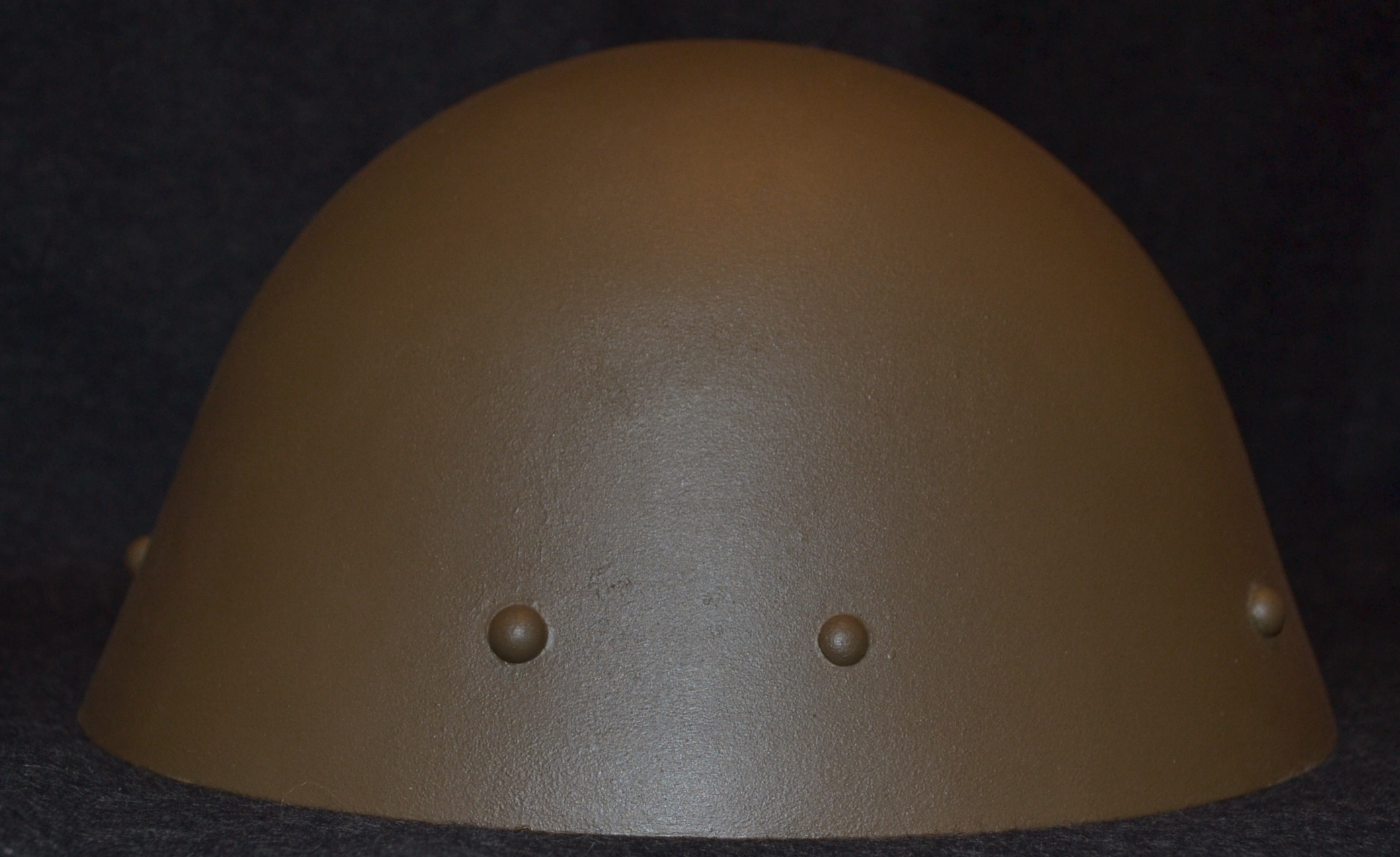
M32 profile, showing the liner rivets and smaller chin strap rivet in the center right

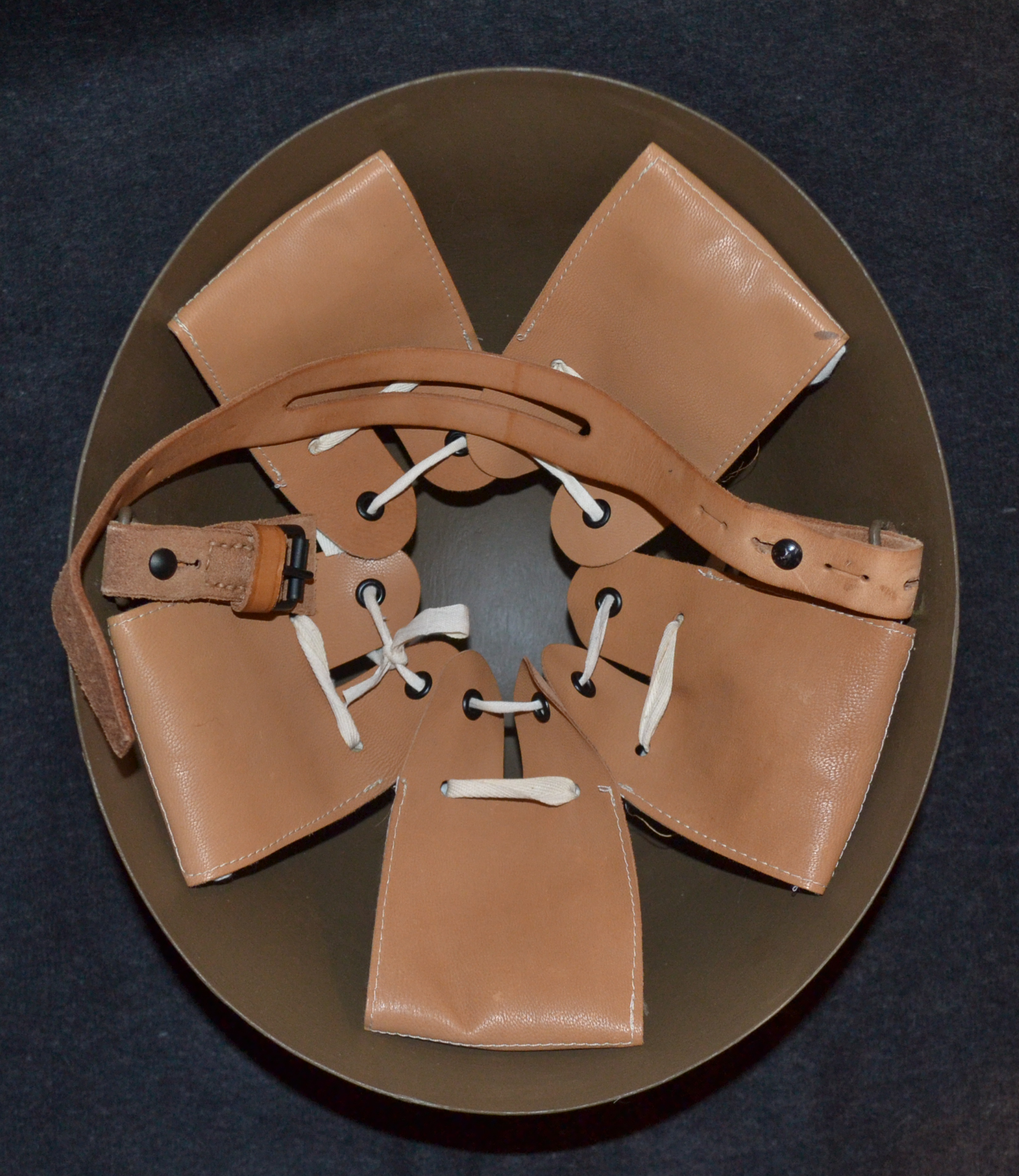
Interior of the helmet showing the simple five pad liner and chin strap setup

The M32 helmet (Czech: Přilba vz. 32) also known as M32/34 is a military steel combat helmet used by Czechoslovakia from its adoption in 1932 to its annexation by Nazi Germany in 1939. The helmet also being used by the Slovak Republic and Finland among other countries that the helmet would be worn by.

== Design ==
The helmet is noted for its simplistic design compared to other helmets of its time, being described by collectors as a distinct egg shape. The liner contained five leather pads attached directly to the shell by means of a single split pin for each pad, and the leather chinstrap (canvas chin straps were also known to be used) attaching by the same means on opposite sides of the shell. The basic coloring of the shell was a greenish brown, post Second World War the helmets would commonly be painted black and used with fire brigades and civil defense.

== Users ==
After its annexation by Nazi Germany, the military stocks of the Czechoslovak army would be sold/given away to Germany and its allies during the Second World War. Most prominently by Nazi Germany as a Luftschutz helmet. Also being used by the Slovak Republic and its army fighting in the Eastern Front, the helmets being marked with a blue stripe along the rim and a white double cross on both sides. Chile adopted the helmet in 1939 and would use them until 1970. Finland would receive stocks of this helmet from Germany during the Continuation War.

Estonia, Denmark, Yugoslavia, Italy, and Poland would be known to use the helmet in some capacity during or after the Second World War.
