= M32 tank recovery vehicle =

M32 recovery vehicle
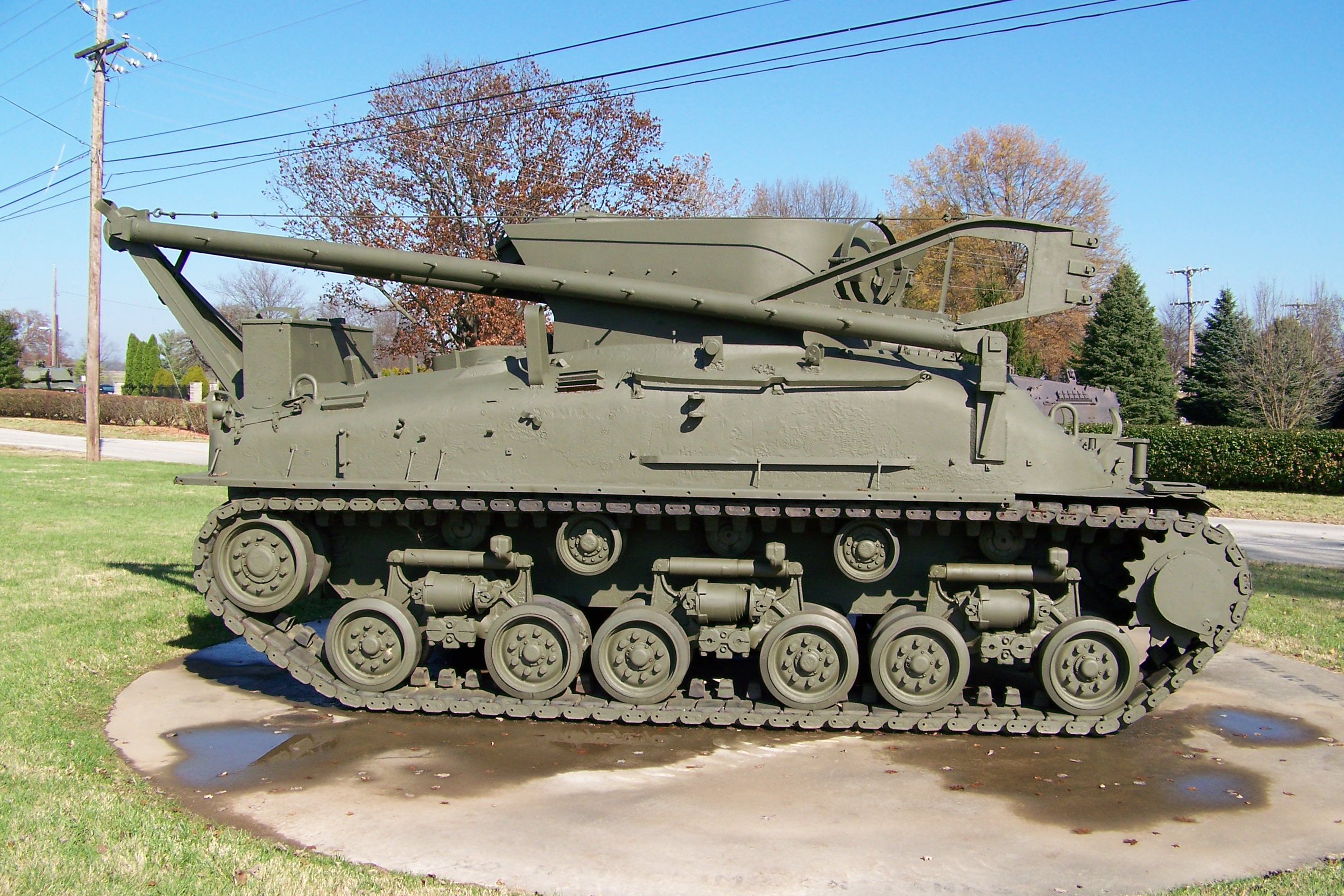
- An M32 tank recovery vehicle on display at Fort Knox, Kentucky
- Type: Armored recovery vehicle
- Place of origin: United States

Service history
- In service: July 1943 to September 1958 (U.S.) late 1990s (Mexico)
- Used by: United States; United Kingdom; Indonesia; Israel; Mexico; Pakistan; Yugoslavia
- Wars: World War II; Korean War; Suez Crisis; 1965 Indo-Pakistani War; Six-Day War; Yom Kippur War

Production history
- Designer: Ordnance Department
- Designed: June 1943
- Manufacturer: Baldwin Locomotive Works; Federal Machine and Welder; International Harvester; Lima Locomotive Works; Pressed Steel Car Company
- Developed into: M74 armored recovery vehicle
- Produced: July 1943-May 1945
- No. built: 1,562
- Variants: M32B1, M32B2, M32B3, M32A1B1, M32A1B2, M32A1B3, M34 Prime Mover

Specifications
- Mass: 64,300 lb (4,590 st) (M32, M32B1, and M32B3), 67,600 lb (4,830 st) (M32B2).
- Length: 19.3 ft (5.9 m)(length of hull), 18 ft (5.5 m) (length of A-frame boom)
- Width: 8.9 ft (2.7 m)
- Height: 9.66 ft (2.94 m)
- Crew: 4
- Armor: 0.5–2 in (13–51 mm)
- Main armament: 1 × 81 mm mortar
- Secondary armament: 1 × 0.5 in machine gun (300 rounds), 1 × 0.3 in machine gun (9,000 rounds), 20 hand grenades (Fragmentation, Mk. II), 6 smoke grenades.
- Engine: M32 and M32B1 model: Continental R975-C1 or -C4 9 cylinder radial gasoline engine, 350 or 400 hp (261 or 298 kW) at 2,400 rpm; M32B2 model: General Motors 6046 twin inline diesel engine; 375 hp (280 kW) at 2,100 rpm; M32B3 model: Ford GAA V8 gasoline engine; 450 hp (336 kW) at 2,600 rpm
- Payload capacity: 10 short tons (9.1 t)
- Transmission: Spicer manual synchromesh transmission, one reverse and five forward gears
- Suspension: Vertical Volute Spring Suspension (VVSS), -A1 variants with Horizontal Volute Spring Suspension (HVSS)
- Fuel capacity: 148–175 US gal (560–660 L)
- Operational range: 120–150 mi (190–240 km)
- Maximum speed: 24 mph (39 km/h)

The M32 tank recovery vehicle was an armored recovery vehicle (ARV) used during World War II and the Korean War by the United States, and was based on the chassis of the M4 Sherman medium tank. During World War II, the British also used several hundred M32s, which were obtained through Lend-Lease in 1944. The first four prototypes were produced in January 1943, labeled T5, T5E1, T5E2, T5E3, and T5E4. After a series of tests at the Aberdeen Proving Grounds, the prototypes were approved as M32, M32E1, M32E2, M32E3, and M32E4. However, the M32E4 never entered production. There were also variants that had upgraded recovery equipment for horizontal volute spring suspension (HVSS), which were demarcated by the suffix "A1" after the model number, however some were upgraded to HVSS without the upgraded recovery equipment these were simply designated M32 HVSS.

Lima Locomotive Works started production of the vehicles in June 1943, with five pilot vehicles (one of each model, including the M32B4 which did not enter production), 26 M32B2s, and 20 M32B3s. Pressed Steel Car produced 163 M32s and 475 M32B1s in 1944. They also produced 298 M32B3s. Baldwin Locomotive Works produced 180 M32B1s, while 400 M32B1s were produced by Federal Machine and Welder Company before the end of 1944. 24 M32B1s were converted into M34 Prime Movers, used to pull heavy artillery. The M32s were used beginning in 1944 during Operation Overlord and subsequent battles in the European Theater of Operations. It was also used during the Korean War. It was phased out after the introduction of the M74 tank recovery vehicle in 1954, when heavier tanks were produced, such as the M46 Patton. The M32 had a 30 short tons (27 t) winch, 18 ft (5.5 m) boom, and an A-frame jib. It was armed with two machine guns and a mortar mainly to provide cover for an emergency retreat.

== Specifications ==
The M32 tank recovery vehicle was an armored recovery vehicle based on the chassis of the M4 Sherman medium tank, adding an 18 ft (5.5 m) boom, an A-frame jib, and a 30-short-ton (27 t) winch. It was 19.3 ft (5.9 m) long, adding 18 ft (5.5 m) when the boom, which is used to lift damaged vehicles, was fully extended. The width was 8.9 ft (2.7 m) and the height was 9.66 ft (2.94 m). It weighed either 64,300 lb (29,200 kg) (M32, M32B1, and M32B3), or 67,600 lb (30,700 kg) (M32B2) depending on the model. The engine varied between which variant of the M4 Sherman it was based upon; the M32 and M32B1 model had a Continental R975-C1 or -C4 9 cylinder radial gasoline engine, running at 2,400 rpm, the M32B2 model had a General Motors 6046 twin diesel engine; running at 2,100 rpm, and the M32B3 model had a Ford GAA V8 gasoline engine running at 2,600 rpm. The range and fuel capacity likewise varied between 120–150 mi (190–240 km) and 148–175 US gal (560–660 L), respectively, depending on the engine and base vehicle. However, top speed remained constant at 24 mph (39 km/h).

It had a Spicer manual synchromesh transmission, with one reverse and five forward gears. The suspension was VVSS for earlier variants, and HVSS for later variants. The A1 designation is for the boom system which was designed for the HVSS system, but this wasn’t needed. The only A1s are the M32B1A1s equipped with the E9 suspension, the T14E1 TRV was never designed M32B3A1. After the war the M32, M32B1, and M32B3 were equipped with HVSS, these just had HVSS added to there designation like other Sherman’s (M4A3 76W becoming M4A3 76W HVSS for example).[1] It had between 0.5–2 in (13–51 mm) of armor depending on location. It had an armament that consisted of an 81 mm mortar, which was used to cover emergency retreats using smoke rounds, one 0.5 in (13 mm) M2 Browning machine gun, and one 0.3 in (7.6 mm) M1919 machine gun. There were 20 hand grenades (Fragmentation Mk.II), and six smoke grenades in the crew compartment. The armament was used only for self-defense, as the vehicle was not designed to be used as an offensive weapon.

== Development history ==
In early 1942, the US Army began mobilizing and reequipping for war in Europe. Based on British combat experience from earlier in the war, the United States Ordnance Department determined that the Army would need vehicles that could be used to recover armored vehicles that had been damaged in combat. The British had already developed several armored recovery vehicles based on the M4 Sherman such as the AVRE and the BARV; however, the Ordnance Department did not wish to use these variants and ordered several new ARV prototypes to be developed, also based on the M4 Sherman.

The basic prototypes of the M32 were built by Lima Locomotive and were accepted on 11 January 1943. The prototypes were labeled T5, T5E1, T5E2, T5E3, and T5E4. These designs competed against the T2 and T7 designs, which both had a turret mounted boom, at the Aberdeen Proving Grounds. The T5 was declared superior to the T2 and T7 designs after several weeks of testing. The four prototypes were sent to Aberdeen (T5 and T5E1), Camp Hood, Texas, (T5E2), and Camp Seeley, California, (T5E4) for further testing. However, during the testing, the T5E3's engine was damaged, so it could not go through further. In June 1943, Ordnance Committee Minutes 21553 standardized the designs of the T5, T5E1, T5E2, T5E3, and the T5E4 as the M32, M32E1, M32E2, M32E3, M32E4, respectively. These minutes also terminated the T7 project. The M32E4 did not enter production. Many M32s were later converted into M34 prime movers, which were unarmed and fitted with additional equipment used to tow heavy artillery pieces.

== Production history ==
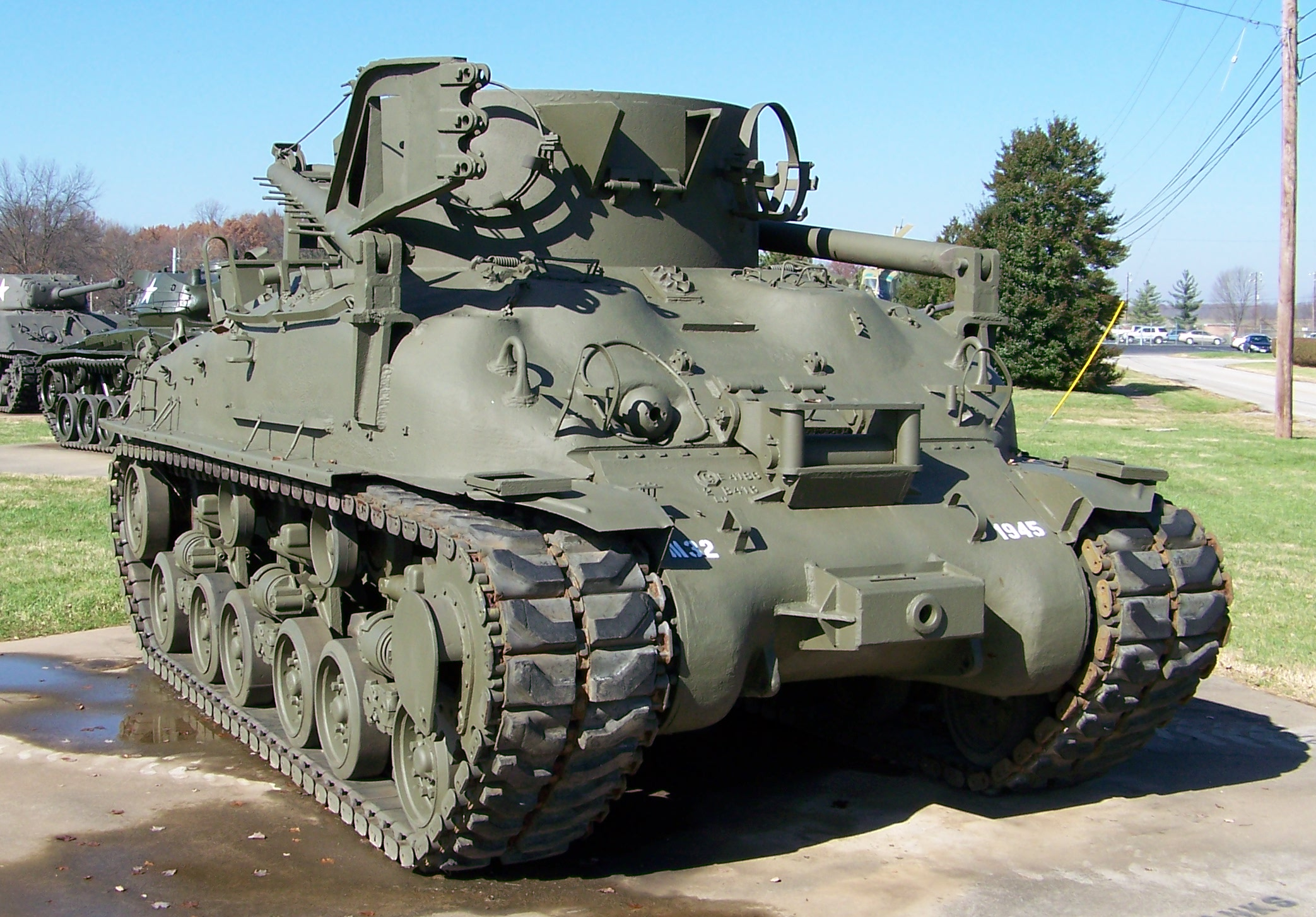
M32 Tank Recovery Vehicle on display at Fort Knox

The serial production of the M32 was started by Lima Locomotive Works, which converted five M32B2s in June 1943. They also intermittently produced 26 M32B3s in May 1944, followed by 20 more vehicles in the summer of 1944. Pressed Steel Car Company produced 163 M32s and 475 M32B1s from December 1943 to December 1944. Pressed Steel Car also converted 298 M4A3 Shermans into M32B3s between May and December 1944. Baldwin Locomotive Works and the Federal Machine and Welder Company were licensed to produce M32 variants in November 1944. Baldwin Locomotive Works produced 195 M32B1s before June 1945 and the latter produced 385 M32B1s before May of that year. In total, 1562 M32s were produced.

== Service history ==
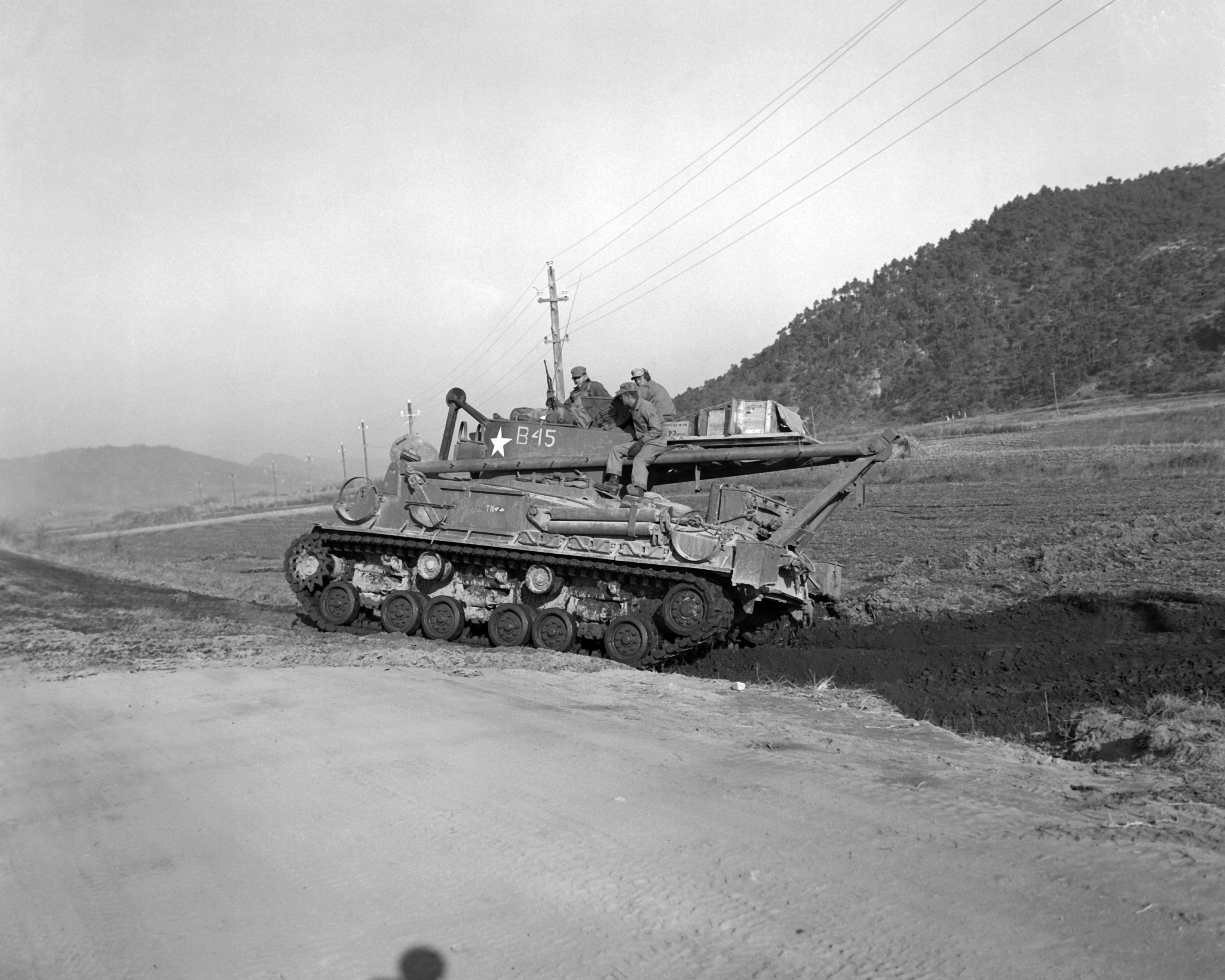
An M32B1A1 recovery vehicle backing up into a ditch after passing a bridge on the road to Hamhung during the Korean War.

The M32 entered service with the US Army in July 1943. They served in the Italian Campaign, Operation Overlord, and many other battles in the European Theater of Operations. The A1 variants, which were converted by Baldwin Locomotive Works in 1945, also served until the end of the Korean War. The M74 tank recovery vehicle replaced the M32B1A1s after the Korean War in 1954 after the production of heavier tanks such as the M46 Patton.

Especially during the Korean War, the M32 was considered inadequate for its role as an armored recovery vehicle because the power of the engine was insufficient to pull new, much heavier tanks, such as the M26 Pershing and M46 Patton. Earlier variants' narrow tracks also gave the vehicle insufficient flotation to move over poor terrain such as mud and snow.

Some M32B1s were also shipped to Britain under lend-lease, where they were designated the ARV Mark III by the British Army. In 1944, the Ordnance Department experimented with the M26 Pershing-based T12 Armored Recovery Vehicle, but it became too expensive and was never put on the production line. The M32 was also planned to have mine-exploding equipment, such as the T1E1 Earthworm and the T2E1 Mine Exploder. However, only the T1E1 had any service with the vehicle.

Several M32s were loaned to the Israeli Army in the late 1940s by the U.S. They saw service in the Suez Crisis, Six-Day War, and Yom Kippur War to tow M51 Super Shermans. Several M32s saw service in the Mexican Army under the nickname "Chenca" until 1998. The U.S. loaned Mexico these M32s shortly after World War II. Some M32 and M32Bs were also sent to Tito's Yugoslavia during the Informbiro period. Also, to the Turkish Army.

An M32A1 ARV of the Pakistan Army at the Ayub National Park's tank dislpay.

From 1949 to 1950, Pakistan received 10 M32s through the lend-lease program. They were used to maintain and support the fleet of M4A1E6 Shermans and M36B2 Tank Busters of the Armored Corps and saw service during the 1965 Indo-Pakistani War.

== Variants ==
- M32 – The original version, based on the M4 Sherman. 163 were produced by Pressed Steel Car in 1944.
- M32B1 – A M32 based on the M4A1. 1,085 were produced by Federal Machine, Baldwin Locomotive, and Pressed Steel Car. Some were also shipped to Britain under lend-lease. It was named ARV Mark III by the British Army.
- M32B2 – A M32 based on the M4A2. 26 were produced by Lima Locomotive.
- M32B3 – A M32 based on the M4A3. 344 were produced by Lima Locomotive and Pressed Steel Car.
- M32B4 – A M32 based on the M4A4. Never entered production. Had a Chrysler Multibank engine.
- M32A1 – A M32 with a modified boom.
- M32A1B1 – A M32B1 with a modified boom and E9 suspension. 175 were converted by Baldwin Locomotive.
- T14E1 with a modified boom an HVSS.
- M34 Prime Mover – M34 Prime Movers were simply M32B1 Recovery Vehicles without the towing cable and were just used for pulling towed artillery into place. It was typically reserved for pulling heavy artillery, such as the 240 mm howitzer. It lacked any armament and had four seats for crew. The vehicle also had tail lights, electric outlets for stopping of towed loads, and multiple stowage ports. Production started in 1944 and ended in 1945.

=== Additional equipment ===
- T1E1 Mine Exploder "Earthworm" – This mine exploding equipment, which was meant to be used with the boom on the M32, was essentially the T1 mine exploder with slightly different trailing discs. Developed and produced in 1943. It saw limited use in the war.
- T2E1 Mine Exploder – This mine exploding equipment, which was meant to be used with the boom on the M32, was essentially the T2 mine exploder, but scaled up for use by the U.S. Marines. It was impractical, and the project was abandoned in October 1943.
