= Ford GAA engine =

Ford GAA

Overview
- Manufacturer: Ford Motor Company
- Production: 1940-1950

Layout
- Configuration: 60° V8
- Displacement: 1,100 cu in (18 L)
- Cylinder bore: 5.4 in (137 mm)
- Piston stroke: 6.0 in (152 mm)
- Valvetrain: DOHC
- Valvetrain drive system: Worm gears
- Compression ratio: 7.5:1

Combustion
- Fuel system: Naturally aspirated engine with Stromberg NA-Y5-G carburetors
- Fuel type: Gasoline
- Cooling system: Liquid

Output
- Power output: 500 hp (373 kW) at 2,600 rpm
- Torque output: 1,050 ft⋅lbf (1,424 N⋅m) at 2,200 rpm

Dimensions
- Length: 59.02 in (150 cm)
- Width: 33.25 in (84 cm)
- Height: 47.78 in (121 cm)
- Dry weight: 1,470 lb (667 kg)

The Ford GAA engine is an American all-aluminum 32-valve DOHC 60-degree gasoline-fueled liquid-cooled V8 internal combustion engine with a flat-plane crank. It was designed and produced by the Ford Motor Company during World War II. It features twin Stromberg NA-Y5-G carburetors, dual magnetos and twin spark plugs making up a full dual ignition system, and crossflow induction. It displaces 1,100 cu in (18 L) and puts out well over 1,000 pound-feet (1,400 N⋅m) of torque from idle to 2,200 rpm. The factory-rated net output was 500 hp (370 kW) at 2,600 rpm.

The GAA powered several models and derivatives of the M4A3 Sherman medium tank.

== Development ==
After the start of World War II, the UK was looking to manufacture complicated parts — notably the crankshafts — of the Rolls-Royce Merlin aircraft engine in the United States, but negotiations with Packard stalled because the company insisted on making complete engines. Ford was asked by the British Government to produce Merlin engines in their factories in England, and delivered 30,400 bomber engine variants of the Merlin by war's end. However, Henry Ford balked at producing the Merlin in Detroit and instead preferred to produce a fresh design, with the ambitious goal of 2000 hp. Although this design had the same bore and stroke as the Merlin, it shared no parts in common and differed substantially in several fundamental ways, such as having four overhead cams instead of the Merlin's two. (Sources: Graham White, Allied Piston Aircraft Engines of World War II, 1995, and Herschel Smith, A History of Aircraft Piston Engines, 1981).

This engine, the XV-1650, was a 60 degree V-12 of 1,650 cubic inch displacement, with an aluminum block and head, dual overhead camshafts and four valves per cylinder. The intention of this design was to help Ford break into the anticipated large market for aircraft engines. It never went into production as the United States Navy only used radial engines for its aircraft and the Army's contractual commitments to existing manufacturers.

With the approach of war, increasing orders for M4 Sherman tanks were causing supply issues with the 9-cylinder radial Wright R-975 Whirlwind engine used. The U.S. Army decided it needed to establish additional engine suppliers, choosing a version of the XV-1650 cut down from twelve cylinders to eight.

In 1942 after the British Tank Mission visit to America in April, there was some pressure from British car and commercial vehicle manufacturers to use the new Ford V8 tank engine in British tanks, rather than the Meteor then under development by Rolls-Royce, as they believed that an adapted aero engine "would not be suitable as a rugged tank engine". The Ford engine prototype had a few hundred hours test-bed running by that time. It was a liquid-cooled Vee similar to the Meteor, but two-thirds the size and Rolls-Royce executive W. A. Robotham doubted its reliability at 600 bhp. The 600 bhp Meteor was designed to fit in the same space in the Crusader tank as the Nuffield Liberty L-12 engine of 340 bhp output. The Ford V8 developed only 500 bhp, and had problems that were not overcome until after the Normandy landings in 1944.

== Production ==
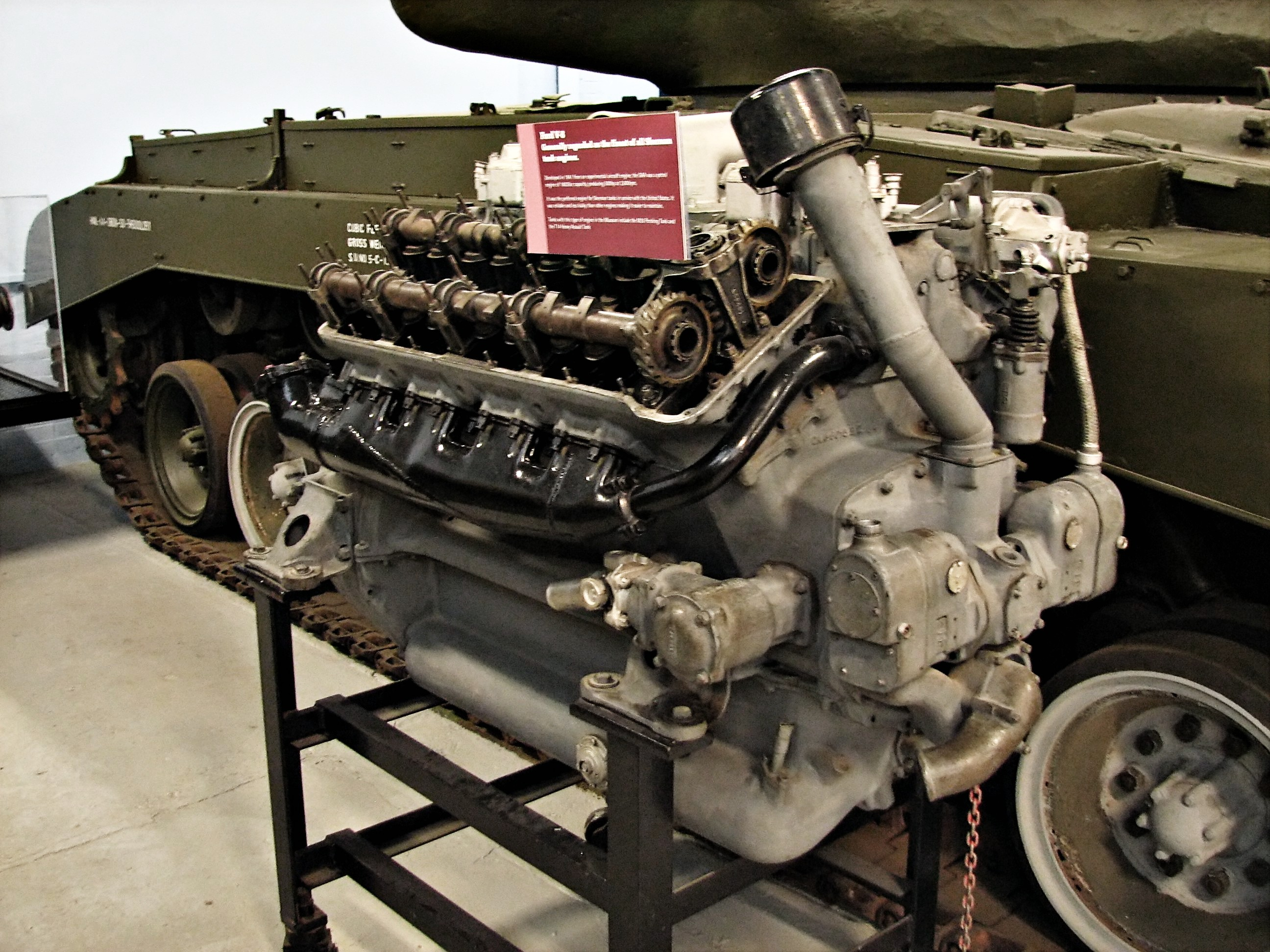
All-aluminum Ford GAF V8 tank engine, next to an M26 Pershing (note the dual overhead camshafts), The Tank Museum

- The GAA was used in the M4A3 (1,690), M4A3(75)W (3,071), M4A3(76)W (1,400), M4A3 (105) (500), M4A3E2 (254), M4A3(76)W HVSS (3,142), M4A3(105) HVSS (2,539), M10A1 (1,413), and M7B1 (826).
- The GAF powered the M26 (2,222), M26A1, T28/T95 (2), and M45 (185).
- The GAN powered the T23 (248) and M4A3E2 (254).
- In order to meet the need for a larger engine, Ford resurrected the V-12 version as the GAC, which produced 770 hp (570 kW) and powered the T29, and T32 (6).
- A number of M74 armored recovery vehicles were rebuilt from M4A3s, which used the GAA.

== See also ==
- List of Ford engines
- History of the tank
- Rolls-Royce Meteor
- Rolls-Royce Meteorite
