= 2012 United States House of Representatives elections in California =

- November 6, 2012

All 53 California seats to the United States House of Representatives
	Majority party	Minority party
Party	Democratic	Republican
Last election	34	19
Seats won	38	15
Seat change	▲4	▼4
Popular vote	7,392,703	4,530,012
Percentage	60.57%	37.12%
Swing	▲7.18%	▼6.38%

Democratic hold Democratic gain
Republican hold Republican gain
Democratic
50–60%
60–70%
70–80%
80–90%
90–100%
Republican
50–60%
60–70%
70–80%
90–100%

The 2012 United States House of Representatives elections in California were held on November 6, 2012, with a primary election on June 5, 2012. Voters elected the 53 U.S. representatives from the state, one from each of the state's 53 congressional districts. The elections coincided with the elections of other federal and state offices, including a quadrennial presidential election and a U.S. Senate election.

According to The Cook Political Report and Roll Call, the most competitive districts were the 7th, 10th, 26th, 36th, and 52nd; additionally, the 3rd, 9th, 24th, 41st, and 47th were rated as less than safe. Roll Call additionally listed the 21st district as competitive. Voters in 14 districts elected new representatives: the 1st, 2nd, 7th, 8th, 15th, 21st, 26th, 29th, 35th, 36th, 41st, 47th, 51st, and 52nd. Two districts, the 30th and the 44th, had two incumbents running against each other.

This was the first election using congressional districts drawn by the California Citizens Redistricting Commission. The districts, based on the 2010 United States census, were approved on August 15, 2011. It was also the first non-special election to use the nonpartisan blanket primary system established by Proposition 14. As a result, eight districts featured general elections with two candidates of the same party: the 15th, 30th, 35th, 40th, 43rd, and 44th with two Democrats; and the 8th and 31st with two Republicans.

== Overview ==
=== Statewide ===
United States House of Representatives elections in California, 2012 Primary election — June 5, 2012
Party	Votes	Percentage	Candidates	Advancing to general	Seats contesting
Democratic	2,643,313	53.41%	107	56	50
Republican	2,072,433	41.87%	98	46	44
No party preference	189,783	3.83%	25	4	4
Green	26,674	0.54%	6	0	0
Libertarian	14,787	0.30%	4	0	0
Peace and Freedom	2,415	0.05%	2	0	0
Valid votes	4,949,405	92.89%	—	—	—
Invalid votes	378,891	7.11%	—	—	—
Totals	5,328,296	100.00%	242	106	—
Voter turnout	31.06%				

United States House of Representatives elections in California, 2012 General election — November 6, 2012
Party	Votes	Percentage	Seats	+/–
Democratic	7,392,703	60.57%	38	▲4
Republican	4,530,012	37.12%	15	▼4
No party preference	281,642	2.31%	0	Steady
Valid votes	12,204,357	92.44%	—	—
Invalid or blank votes	997,801	7.56%	—	—
Totals	13,202,158	100.00%	53	—
Voter turnout	72.36%			

Popular vote
Democratic	53.41%
Republican	41.87%
No party preference	3.83%
Green	0.54%
Other	0.35%

House seats
Democratic	71.70%
Republican	28.30%

=== Map key ===
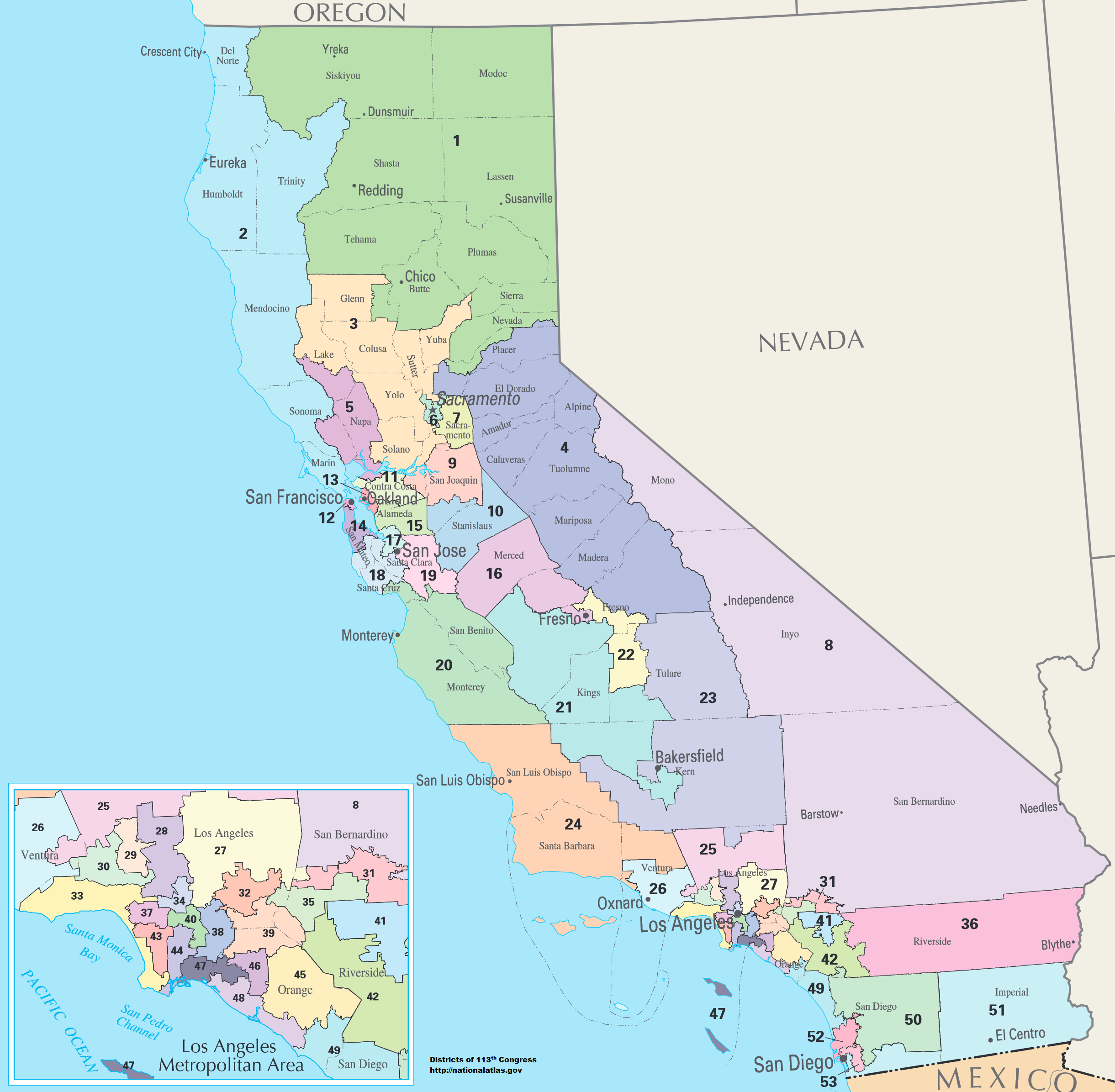

This map displays the location of California's congressional districts during this election cycle, allowing the reader to cross-reference the location of each district.

== District 1 ==
2012 California's 1st congressional district election
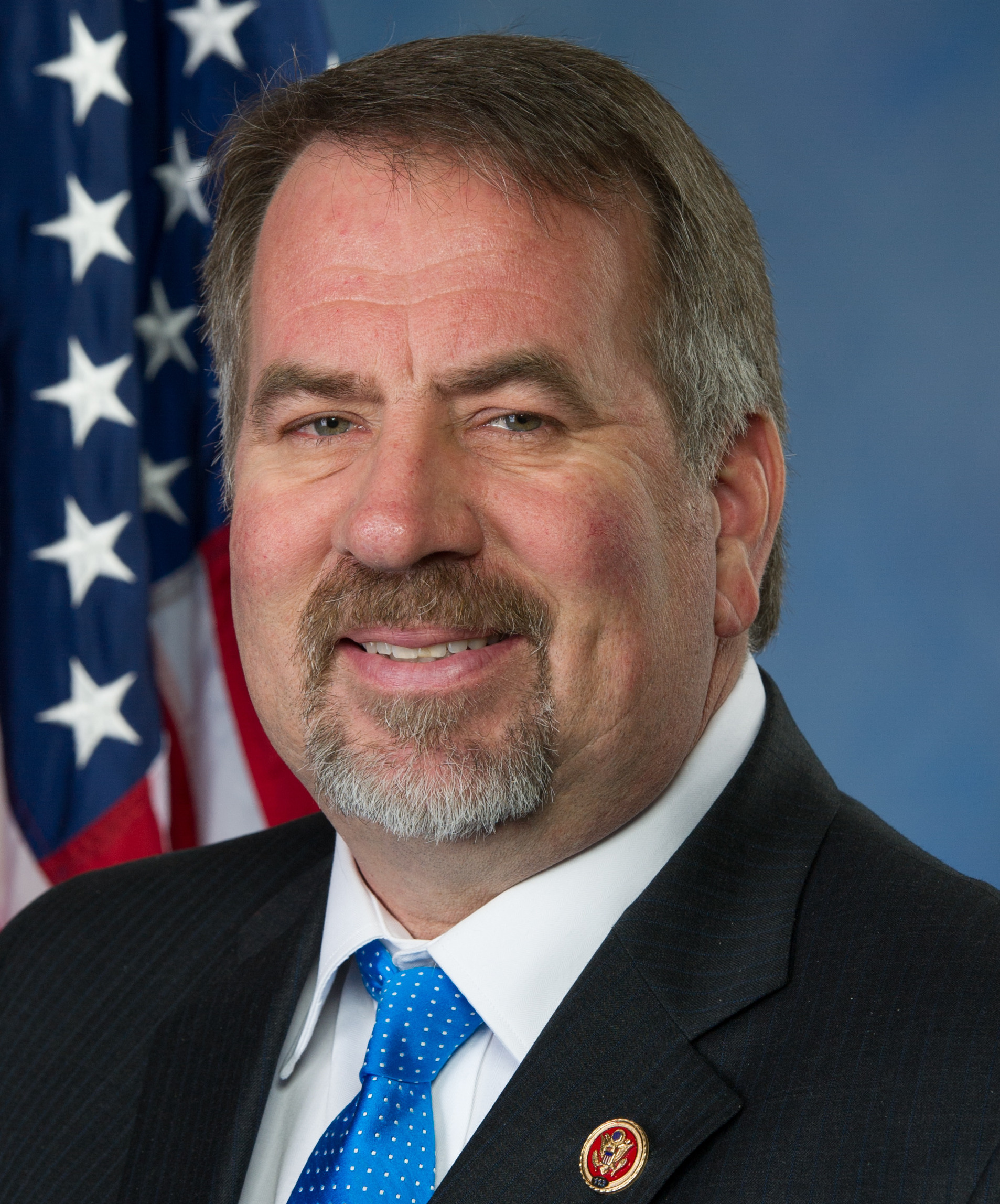

Candidate	Doug LaMalfa	Jim Reed
Party	Republican	Democratic
Popular vote	168,827	125,386
Percentage	57.4%	42.6%
- County results LaMalfa: 50–60% 60–70% 70–80%
U.S. Representative before election
Wally Herger
Republican
Elected U.S. Representative
Doug LaMalfa
Republican

The 1st district is based in inland Northern California and includes Chico and Redding. Incumbent Republican Wally Herger, who represented the 2nd district from 1987 to 2013, retired. The district had a PVI of R+10.

=== Primary election ===
==== Republican candidates ====
===== Advanced to general =====
- Doug LaMalfa, state senator

===== Eliminated in primary =====
- Sam Aanestad, former state senator
- Gregory Cheadle, real estate broker
- Michael Dacquisto, attorney
- Pete Stiglich, retired Air Force Colonel and candidate for this seat in 2010

===== Declined =====
- Wally Herger, incumbent U.S. representative

==== Democratic candidates ====
===== Advanced to general =====
- Jim Reed, attorney and nominee for this seat in 2010

===== Eliminated in primary =====
- Nathan Arrowsmith

==== Campaign ====
Reed was endorsed by the California Democratic Party in February 2012. In March 2012, the California Republican Party declined to make an endorsement in the 1st district.

==== Endorsements ====
Jim Reed (D)

Labor unions

- AFL-CIO

==== Results ====
Nonpartisan blanket primary results
Party	Candidate	Votes	%
Republican	Doug LaMalfa	66,527	37.9
Democratic	Jim Reed	43,409	24.8
Republican	Sam Aanestad	25,224	14.4
Republican	Michael Dacquisto	10,530	6.0
Republican	Pete Stiglich	10,258	5.8
Democratic	Nathan Arrowsmith	8,598	4.9
No party preference	Gary Allen Oxley	5,901	3.4
Republican	Gregory Cheadle	4,939	2.8
Total votes		175,386	100.0

=== General election ===
==== Endorsements ====
Doug LaMalfa (R)

Organizations

- National Republican Congressional Committee "Vanguard" Program
- National Right to Life Committee
- NRA Political Victory Fund
- United States Chamber of Commerce
Jim Reed (D)

Labor unions

- AFL-CIO
- International Brotherhood of Boilermakers

==== Predictions ====
Source	Ranking	As of
The Cook Political Report	Safe R	November 5, 2012
Rothenberg	Safe R	November 2, 2012
Roll Call	Safe R	November 4, 2012
Sabato's Crystal Ball	Safe R	November 5, 2012
NY Times	Safe R	November 4, 2012
RCP	Safe R	November 4, 2012
The Hill	Safe R	November 4, 2012

==== Results ====
California's 1st Congressional District, 2012
Party	Candidate	Votes	%
Republican	Doug LaMalfa	168,827	57.4
Democratic	Jim Reed	125,386	42.6
Majority		43,441	14.8
Total votes		294,213	100.0
Republican hold			

== District 2 ==
2012 California's 2nd congressional district election
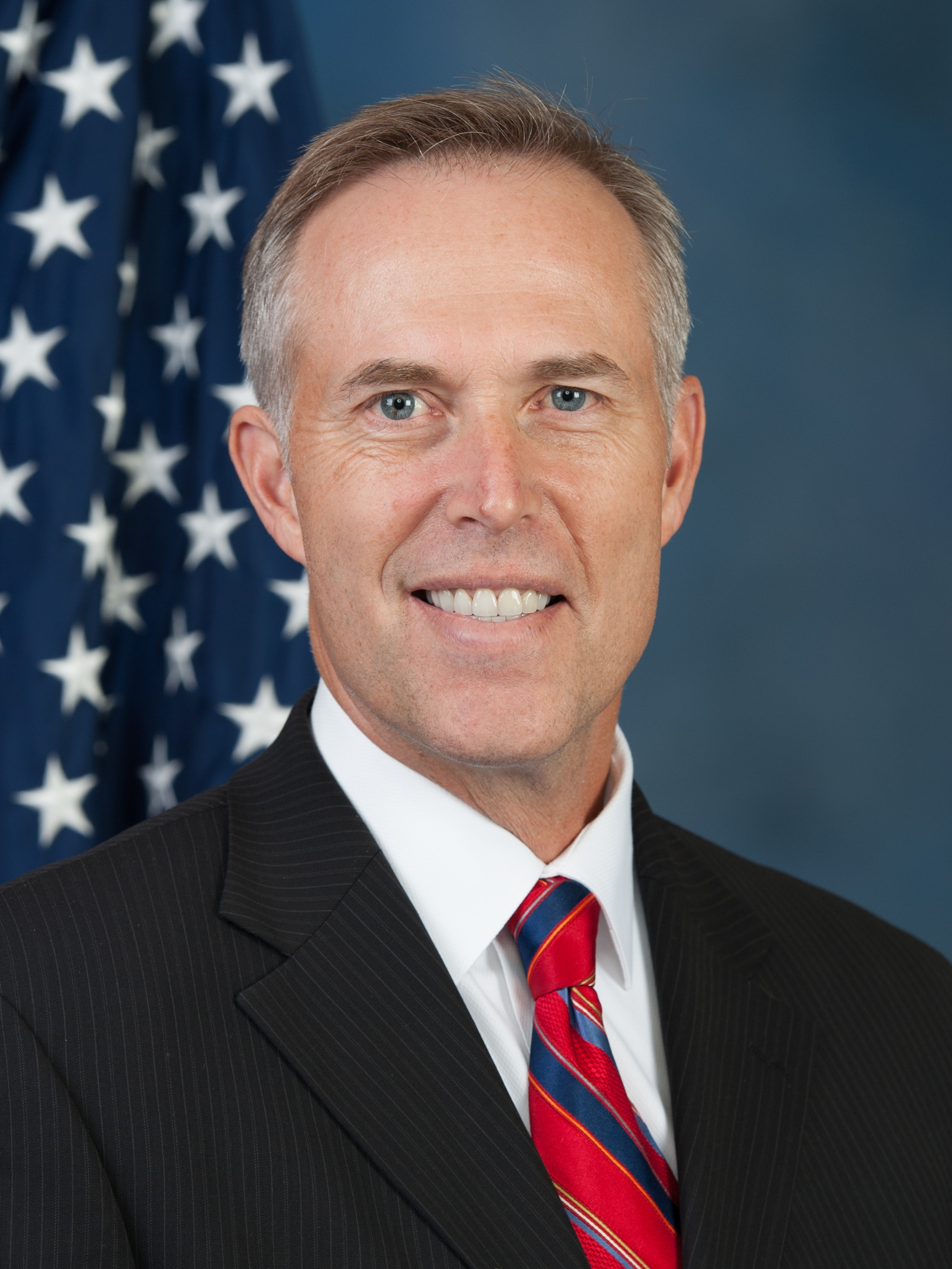

Candidate	Jared Huffman	Daniel Roberts
Party	Democratic	Republican
Popular vote	226,216	91,310
Percentage	71.2%	28.8%
- County results Huffman: 60–70% 70–80% Roberts: 50–60%
U.S. Representative before election
Lynn Woolsey
Democratic
Elected U.S. Representative
Jared Huffman
Democratic

The 2nd district is based in California's North Coast and includes Marin County and Eureka. Democrat Lynn Woolsey, who represented the 6th district from 1993 to 2013, retired. The district had a PVI of D+19.

=== Primary election ===
==== Democratic candidates ====
===== Advanced to general =====
- Jared Huffman, state assembly member

===== Eliminated in primary =====
- Susan Adams, nurse practitioner and Marin County Board of Supervisors member
- Andy Caffrey
- William Courtney, physician and researcher
- Larry Fritzlan, therapist
- Stacey Lawson, businesswoman and chemical engineer
- Tiffany Renée, former Petaluma City Council member
- Norman Solomon, journalist and activist

===== Declined =====
- Noreen Evans, state senator
- Gavin Newsom, incumbent lieutenant governor of California
- Pam Torliatt, mayor of Petaluma
- Shirlee Zane, Sonoma County supervisor

==== Republican candidates ====
===== Advanced to general =====
- Daniel Roberts, Vietnam War veteran and investment company president

===== Eliminated in primary =====
- Mike Halliwell, college professor

===== Declined =====
- Jim Judd, manufacturing business owner and nominee for this seat in 2010

==== Independent candidates ====
===== Eliminated in primary =====
- Brooke Clarke, small business owner
- John Lewallen

==== Green Party candidates ====
===== Declined =====
- Marnie Glickman (Green), co-chair of the Marin County Green Party
- Nancy Mancias (Green), co-chair of the Marin County Green Party

==== Campaign ====
Regional delegates of the California Democratic Party met in January 2012 but did not endorse a nominee as no candidate received 50 per cent of the vote. Huffman received 48 per cent, Solomon 37 per cent, Adams 12 per cent and Lawson one percent. Meanwhile, Roberts received the endorsement of the California Republican Party in March 2012.

==== Endorsements ====
Jared Huffman (D)

Labor unions

- AFL-CIO

==== Polling ====
Poll source	Date(s) administered	Sample size	Margin of error	Susan Adams (D)	Andy Caffrey (D)	William Courtney (D)	Mike Halliwell (R)	Jared Huffman (D)	Stacey Lawson (D)	Tiffany Renée (D)	Daniel Roberts (R)	Norman Solomon (D)	Undecided
Lake Research Partners (D-Solomon)	April 17–19, 2012	500 (LV)	± 4.4%	8%	—	—	3%	18%	5%	—	3%	10%	47%
Fairbank, Maslin, Maullin, Metz & Associates (D-Huffman)	March 23–29, 2012	500 (LV)	± 4.9%	5%	—	—	5%	24%	9%	—	7%	5%	45%
Lake Research Partners (D-Solomon)	October 18–20, 2011	400 (LV)	± 5.0%	4%	2%	3%	—	16%	4%	1%	12%	11%	46%
Fairbank, Maslin, Maullin, Metz & Associates (D-Huffman)	October 5–9, 2011	400 (LV)	± 5.0%	5%	4%	—	—	20%	5%	3%	18%	7%	37%

==== Results ====
Nonpartisan blanket primary results
Party	Candidate	Votes	%
Democratic	Jared Huffman	63,922	37.5
Republican	Daniel Roberts	25,635	15.0
Democratic	Norman Solomon	25,462	14.9
Democratic	Stacey Lawson	16,946	9.9
Democratic	Susan Adams	14,041	8.2
Republican	Mike Halliwell	10,008	5.9
No party preference	Brooke Clarke	3,715	2.2
Democratic	Tiffany Renée	3,033	1.8
No party preference	John Lewallen	2,488	1.5
Democratic	William L. Courtney	2,385	1.4
Democratic	Andy Caffrey	1,737	1.0
Democratic	Larry Fritzlan	1,151	0.7
Total votes		170,523	100.0

=== General election ===
==== Endorsements ====
Jared Huffman (D)

Labor unions

- AFL-CIO
- International Brotherhood of Boilermakers
- National Association of Letter Carriers

Organizations

- Democratic Congressional Campaign Committee "Majority Makers" Program
- Human Rights Campaign
- Sierra Club

==== Predictions ====
Source	Ranking	As of
The Cook Political Report	Safe D	November 5, 2012
Rothenberg	Safe D	November 2, 2012
Roll Call	Safe D	November 4, 2012
Sabato's Crystal Ball	Safe D	November 5, 2012
NY Times	Safe D	November 4, 2012
RCP	Safe D	November 4, 2012
The Hill	Safe D	November 4, 2012

==== Results ====
California's 2nd congressional district election, 2012
Party	Candidate	Votes	%
Democratic	Jared Huffman	226,216	71.2
Republican	Daniel Roberts	91,310	28.8
Total votes		317,526	100.0
Democratic hold			

== District 3 ==
2012 California's 3rd congressional district election
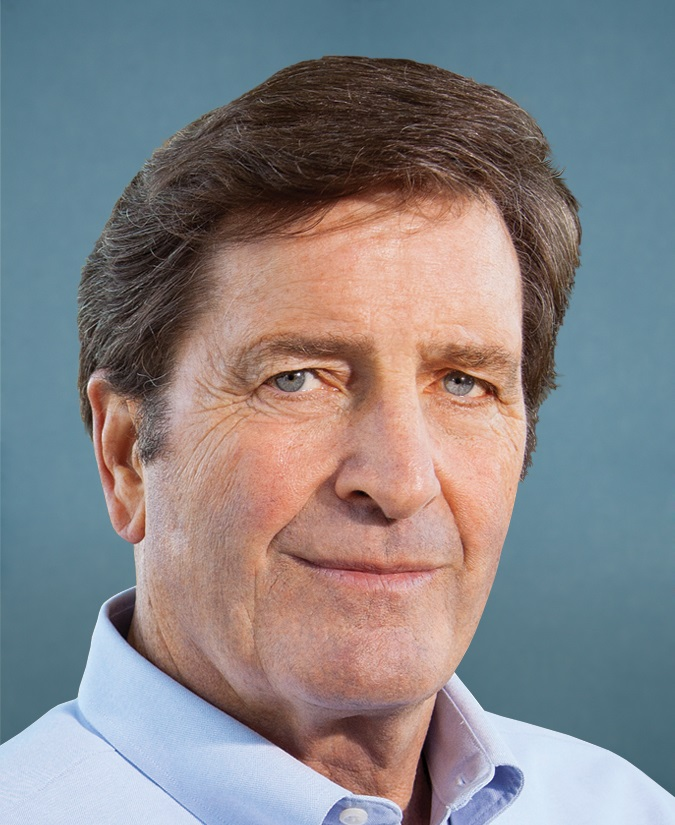

Candidate	John Garamendi	Kim Vann
Party	Democratic	Republican
Popular vote	126,882	107,086
Percentage	54.2%	45.8%
- County results Garamendi: 50–60% 60–70% Vann: 50–60% 60–70%
U.S. Representative before election
John Garamendi
Democratic
Elected U.S. Representative
John Garamendi
Democratic

The 3rd district is based in north central California and includes Davis, Fairfield, and Yuba City. Incumbent Democrat John Garamendi, who represented the 10th district from 2009 to 2013, ran for re-election. The district had a PVI of D+1.

=== Primary election ===
==== Democratic candidates ====
===== Advanced to general =====
- John Garamendi, incumbent U.S. representative

==== Republican candidates ====
===== Advanced to general =====
- Kim Vann, Colusa County Board of Supervisors member

===== Eliminated in primary =====
- Tony Carlos, Sutter County deputy district attorney
- Eugene Ray, realtor
- Rick Tubbs, pilot

===== Withdrawn =====
- Timothy Core, small business employee
- Charlie Schaupp, farmer

==== Campaign ====
Garamendi received the endorsement of the California Democratic Party in February 2012. In March 2012, the California Republican Party declined to make an endorsement in the 3rd district.

==== Endorsements ====
John Garamendi (D)

Labor unions

- AFL-CIO

==== Results ====
Nonpartisan blanket primary results
Party	Candidate	Votes	%
Democratic	John Garamendi (incumbent)	59,546	51.5
Republican	Kim Vann	30,254	26.2
Republican	Rick Tubbs	17,902	15.5
Republican	Tony Carlos	5,541	4.8
Republican	Eugene Ray	2,438	2.1
Total votes		115,681	100.0

=== General election ===
==== Endorsements ====
John Garamendi (D)

Labor unions

- AFL-CIO
- International Brotherhood of Boilermakers
- National Association of Letter Carriers

Organizations

- Democratic Congressional Campaign Committee "Frontline" Program
- Human Rights Campaign
- National Organization for Women
- Sierra Club
Kim Vann (R)

Organizations

- Maggie's List
- National Republican Congressional Committee "Young Guns" Program
- NRA Political Victory Fund
- United States Chamber of Commerce

==== Polling ====
Poll source	Date(s) administered	Sample size	Margin of error	John Garamendi (D)	Kim Vann (R)	Undecided
GBA Strategies (D-House Majority PAC)	August 26–27, 2012	400 (LV)	± 4.9%	54%	39%	7%
DCCC (D)	July 25, 2012	303 (LV)	± 5.6%	52%	37%	11%

==== Predictions ====
Source	Ranking	As of
The Cook Political Report	Likely D	November 5, 2012
Rothenberg	Safe D	November 2, 2012
Roll Call	Safe D	November 4, 2012
Sabato's Crystal Ball	Likely D	November 5, 2012
NY Times	Likely D	November 4, 2012
RCP	Lean D	November 4, 2012
The Hill	Lean D	November 4, 2012

==== Results ====
California's 3rd congressional district election, 2012
Party	Candidate	Votes	%
Democratic	John Garamendi (incumbent)	126,882	54.2
Republican	Kim Vann	107,086	45.8
Majority		19,796	8.4
Total votes		233,968	100.0
Democratic hold			

== District 4 ==
2012 California's 4th congressional district election
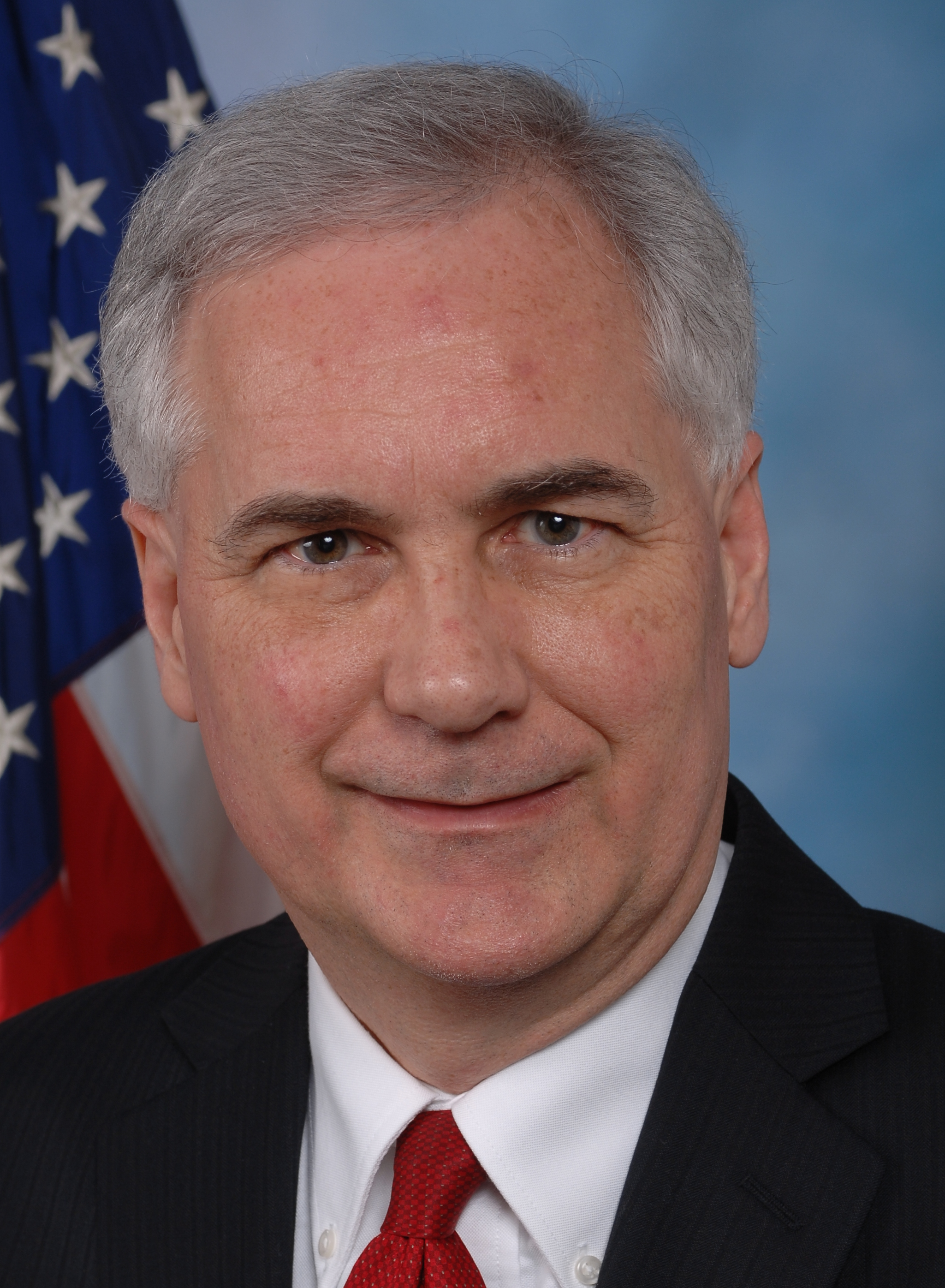

Candidate	Tom McClintock	Jack Uppal
Party	Republican	Democratic
Popular vote	197,803	125,885
Percentage	61.1%	38.9%
- County results McClintock: 50–60% 60–70% 70–80% Uppal: 50–60% 60–70%
U.S. Representative before election
Tom McClintock
Republican
Elected U.S. Representative
Tom McClintock
Republican

The 4th district is based in east central California and includes Lake Tahoe, Roseville, and Yosemite National Park. Incumbent Republican Tom McClintock, who had represented the 4th district since 2009, ran for re-election. The district had a PVI of R+10.

=== Primary election ===
==== Republican candidates ====
===== Advanced to general =====
- Tom McClintock, incumbent U.S. representative

===== Declined =====
- Dan Lungren, incumbent U.S. representative for the 3rd district (running in the 7th)

==== Democratic candidates ====
===== Advanced to general =====
- Jack Uppal, retired semiconductor engineer

==== Campaign ====
Uppal was endorsed by the California Democratic Party in February 2012, with McClintock receiving the endorsement of the California Republican Party in March 2012.

==== Endorsements ====
Jack Uppal (D)

Labor unions

- AFL-CIO

==== Results ====
California's 4th congressional district election, 2012
Party	Candidate	Votes	%
Republican	Tom McClintock (incumbent)	114,311	64.8
Democratic	Jack Uppal	62,130	35.2
Total votes		176,441	100.0

=== General election ===
==== Endorsements ====
Tom McClintock (R)

Organizations

- Campaign for Working Families
- National Right to Life Committee
- NRA Political Victory Fund
- Republican Liberty Caucus
- United States Chamber of Commerce
Jack Uppal (D)

Labor unions

- AFL-CIO
- International Brotherhood of Boilermakers

==== Predictions ====
Source	Ranking	As of
The Cook Political Report	Safe R	November 5, 2012
Rothenberg	Safe R	November 2, 2012
Roll Call	Safe R	November 4, 2012
Sabato's Crystal Ball	Safe R	November 5, 2012
NY Times	Safe R	November 4, 2012
RCP	Safe R	November 4, 2012
The Hill	Safe R	November 4, 2012

==== Results ====
California's 4th congressional district election, 2012
Party	Candidate	Votes	%
Republican	Tom McClintock (incumbent)	197,803	61.1
Democratic	Jack Uppal	125,885	38.9
Total votes		323,688	100.0
Republican hold			

== District 5 ==
2012 California's 5th congressional district election
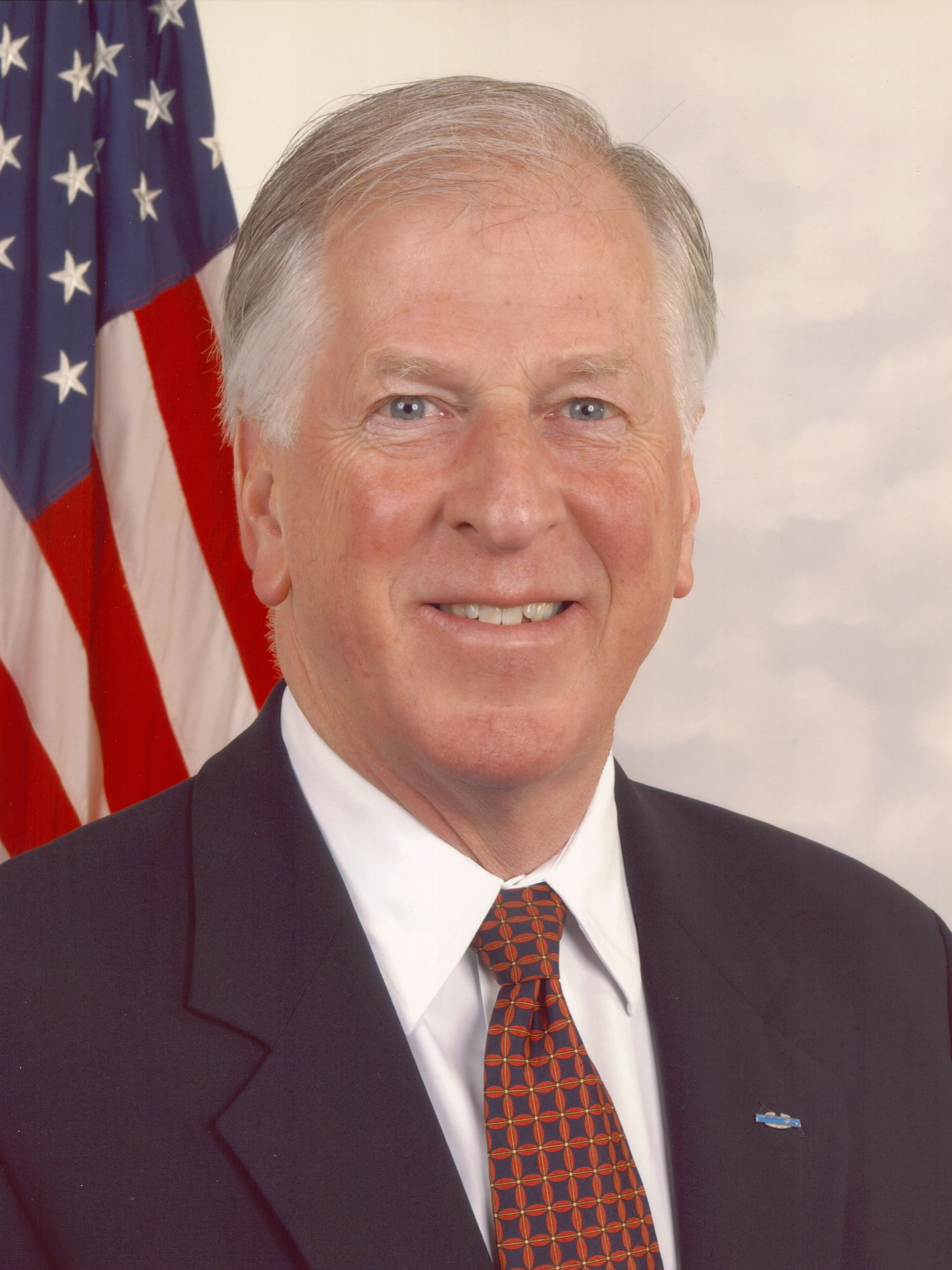

Candidate	Mike Thompson	Randy Loftin
Party	Democratic	Republican
Popular vote	202,872	69,545
Percentage	74.5%	25.5%
- County results Thompson: 60–70% 70–80%
U.S. Representative before election
Mike Thompson
Democratic
Elected U.S. Representative
Mike Thompson
Democratic

The 5th district is based in the North Bay and includes Napa, Santa Rosa, and Vallejo. Incumbent Democrat Mike Thompson, who had represented the 1st district from 1999 to 2013, ran for re-election. The district had a PVI of D+18.

=== Primary election ===
==== Democratic candidates ====
===== Advanced to general =====
- Mike Thompson, incumbent U.S. representative

==== Republican candidates ====
===== Advanced to general =====
- Randy Loftin, tax and financial planning adviser

===== Eliminated in primary =====
- Stewart Cilley, accountant

==== Campaign ====
Thompson received the endorsement of the California Democratic Party in February 2012, while Loftin was endorsed by the California Republican Party in March.

==== Endorsements ====
Mike Thompson (D)

Labor unions

- AFL-CIO

Organizations

- Blue Dog Coalition
Stewart Cilley (R)

Organizations

- Republican Liberty Caucus

==== Results ====
Nonpartisan blanket primary results
Party	Candidate	Votes	%
Democratic	Mike Thompson (incumbent)	95,748	72.2
Republican	Randy Loftin	22,137	16.7
Republican	Stewart Cilley	14,734	11.1
Total votes		132,619	100.0

=== General election ===
==== Endorsements ====
Mike Thompson (D)

Labor unions

- AFL-CIO
- International Brotherhood of Boilermakers
- National Association of Letter Carriers

Organizations

- Blue Dog Coalition
- Human Rights Campaign
- Sierra Club
Randy Loftin (R)

Organizations

- Eagle Forum

==== Predictions ====
Source	Ranking	As of
The Cook Political Report	Safe D	November 5, 2012
Rothenberg	Safe D	November 2, 2012
Roll Call	Safe D	November 4, 2012
Sabato's Crystal Ball	Safe D	November 5, 2012
NY Times	Safe D	November 4, 2012
RCP	Safe D	November 4, 2012
The Hill	Safe D	November 4, 2012

==== Results ====
California's 5th congressional district election, 2012
Party	Candidate	Votes	%
Democratic	Mike Thompson (incumbent)	202,872	74.5
Republican	Randy Loftin	69,545	25.5
Total votes		272,417	100.0
Democratic hold			

== District 6 ==
2012 California's 6th congressional district election
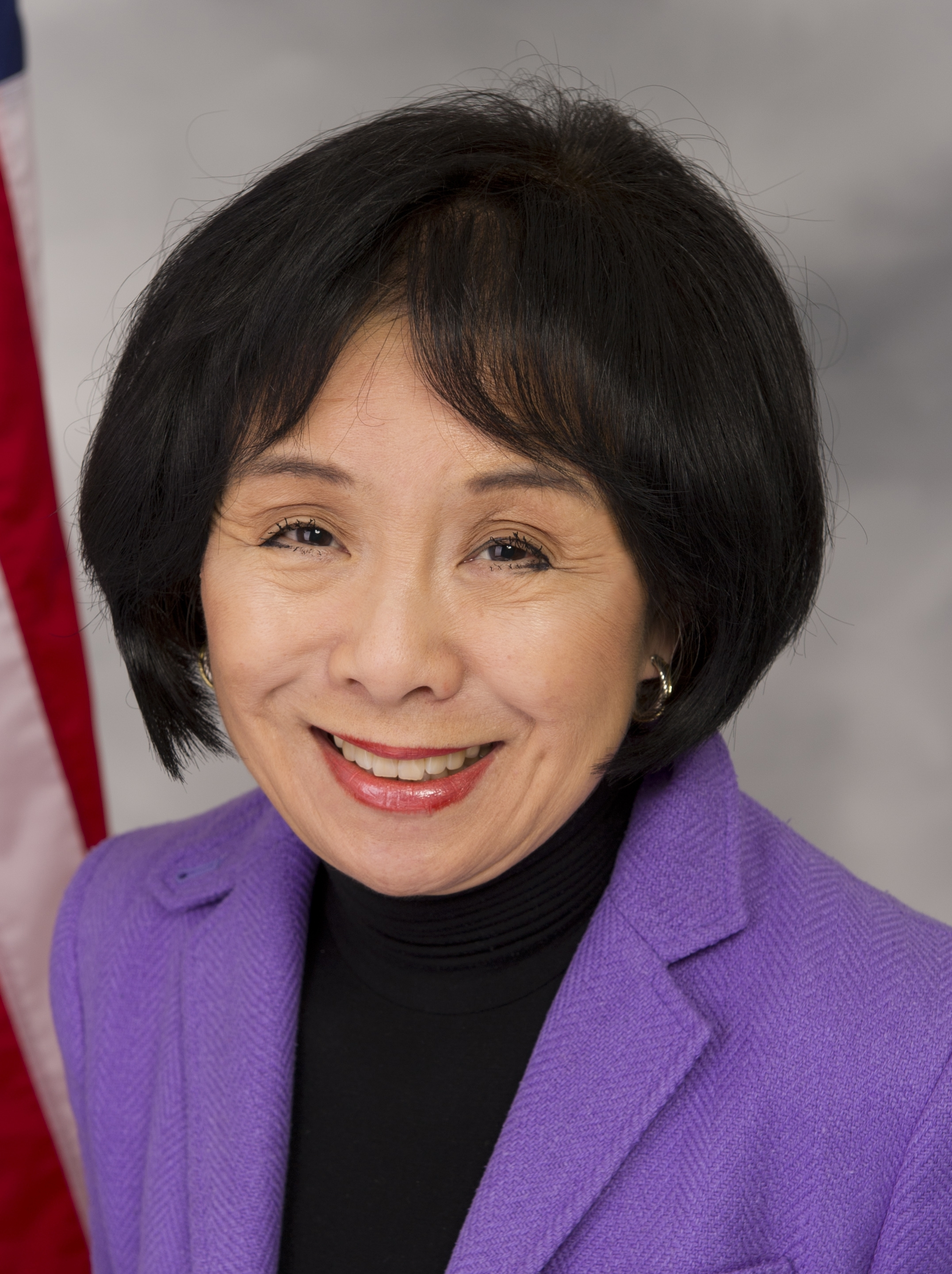

Candidate	Doris Matsui	Joseph McCray, Sr.
Party	Democratic	Republican
Popular vote	160,667	53,406
Percentage	75.1%	24.9%
- County results Matsui: 60–70% 70–80%
U.S. Representative before election
Doris Matsui
Democratic
Elected U.S. Representative
Doris Matsui
Democratic

The 6th district is based in north central California and includes Sacramento. Incumbent Democrat Doris Matsui, who represented the 5th district from 2005 to 2013, ran for re-election here. The district had a PVI of D+13.

=== Primary election ===
==== Democratic candidates ====
===== Advanced to general =====
- Doris Matsui, incumbent U.S. representative

==== Republican candidates ====
===== Advanced to general =====
- Joseph McCray Sr., business owner

===== Eliminated in primary =====
- Erik Smitt

==== Campaign ====
Matsui was endorsed by the California Democratic Party in February 2012.

==== Endorsements ====
Doris Matsui (D)

Labor unions

- AFL-CIO

==== Results ====
Nonpartisan blanket primary results
Party	Candidate	Votes	%
Democratic	Doris Matsui (incumbent)	67,174	71.4
Republican	Joseph McCray, Sr.	15,647	16.6
Republican	Erik Smitt	11,254	12.0
Total votes		94,075	100.0

=== General election ===
==== Endorsements ====
Doris Matsui (D)

Labor unions

- AFL-CIO
- International Brotherhood of Boilermakers
- National Association of Letter Carriers

Organizations

- Human Rights Campaign
- National Organization for Women
- Sierra Club

==== Predictions ====
Source	Ranking	As of
The Cook Political Report	Safe D	November 5, 2012
Rothenberg	Safe D	November 2, 2012
Roll Call	Safe D	November 4, 2012
Sabato's Crystal Ball	Safe D	November 5, 2012
NY Times	Safe D	November 4, 2012
RCP	Safe D	November 4, 2012
The Hill	Safe D	November 4, 2012

==== Results ====
California's 6th congressional district election, 2012
Party	Candidate	Votes	%
Democratic	Doris Matsui (incumbent)	160,667	75.1
Republican	Joseph McCray, Sr.	53,406	24.9
Total votes		214,073	100.0
Democratic hold			

== District 7 ==
2012 California's 7th congressional district election
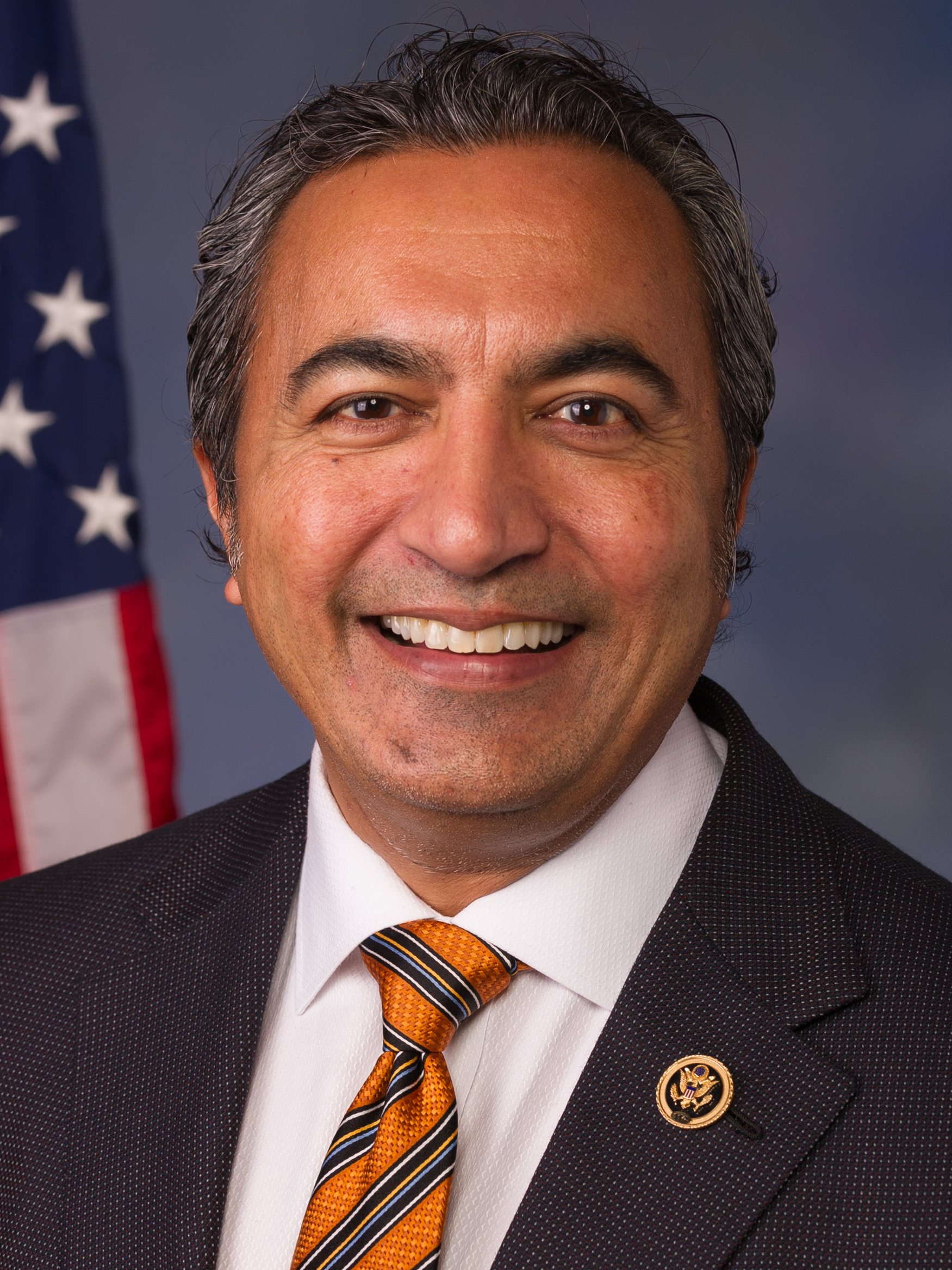

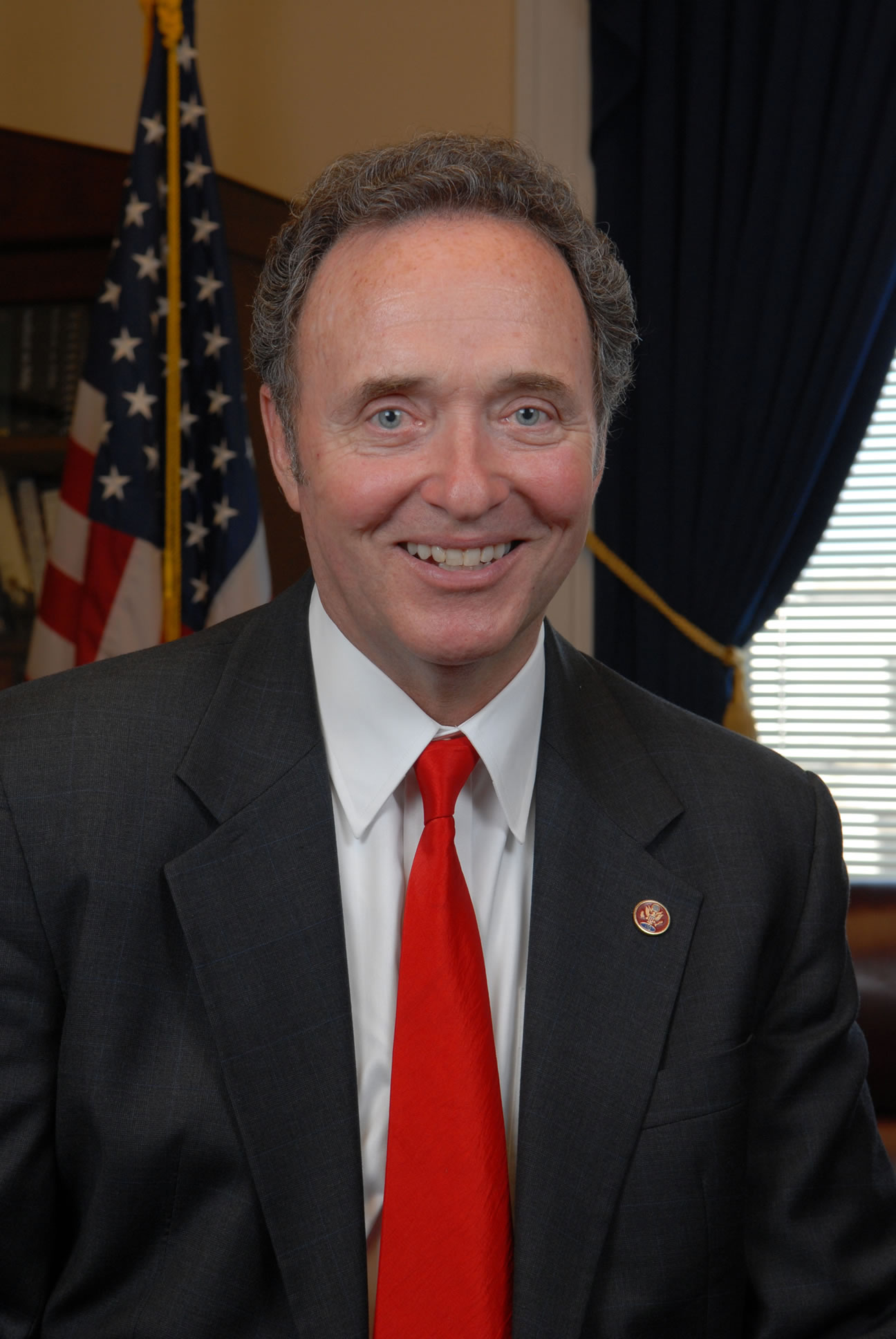
Candidate	Ami Bera	Dan Lungren
Party	Democratic	Republican
Popular vote	141,241	132,050
Percentage	51.7%	48.3%
- County results Bera: 50–60%
U.S. Representative before election
Dan Lungren
Republican
Elected U.S. Representative
Ami Bera
Democratic

The 7th district is based in north central California and includes eastern Sacramento County. Incumbent Republican Dan Lungren, who represented the 3rd district from 2005 to 2013 and previously served from 1979 until 1989, ran for re-election. The district had a PVI of R+3.

=== Primary election ===
==== Republican candidates ====
===== Advanced to general =====
- Dan Lungren, incumbent U.S. representative

===== Declined =====
- Darren Spellman, Calaveras County Board of Supervisors member

==== Democratic candidates ====
===== Advanced to general =====
- Ami Bera, physician and nominee for this seat in 2010

===== Declined =====
- Alyson Huber, state assembly member

==== Campaign ====
Bera received the endorsement of the California Democratic Party in February 2012. Lungren was endorsed by the California Republican Party in March 2012.

==== Endorsements ====
Ami Bera (D)

Labor unions

- AFL-CIO

==== Results ====
Nonpartisan blanket primary results
Party	Candidate	Votes	%
Republican	Dan Lungren (incumbent)	63,586	52.7
Democratic	Ami Bera	49,433	41.0
No party preference	Curt Taras	3,854	3.2
Libertarian	Douglas Arthur Tuma	3,707	3.1
Total votes		120,580	100.0

=== General election ===
==== Endorsements ====
Dan Lungren (R)

Organizations

- Campaign for Working Families
- National Republican Congressional Committee "Patriot" Program
- National Right to Life Committee
- United States Chamber of Commerce
Ami Bera (D)

Labor unions

- AFL-CIO
- International Brotherhood of Boilermakers
- National Association of Letter Carriers

Organizations

- Democratic Congressional Campaign Committee "Red to Blue" Program
- Human Rights Campaign
- National Organization for Women
- Sierra Club
- Veterans' Alliance for Security and Democracy

==== Debates ====
- Complete video of debate, September 25, 2012

==== Polling ====
Poll source	Date(s) administered	Sample size	Margin of error	Dan Lungren (R)	Ami Bera (D)	Undecided
Public Policy Polling (D-CREDO)	October 25–26, 2012	792 (LV)	± ?%	46%	46%	8%
Garin-Hart-Yang (D-House Majority PAC)/SEIU)	August 21–23, 2012	401 (LV)	± 5.0%	47%	47%	6%

==== Predictions ====
Source	Ranking	As of
The Cook Political Report	Tossup	November 5, 2012
Rothenberg	Tilt D (flip)	November 2, 2012
Roll Call	Tossup	November 4, 2012
Sabato's Crystal Ball	Lean D (flip)	November 5, 2012
NY Times	Lean D (flip)	November 4, 2012
RCP	Tossup	November 4, 2012
The Hill	Lean D (flip)	November 4, 2012

==== Results ====
California's 7th congressional district election, 2012
Party	Candidate	Votes	%
Democratic	Ami Bera	141,241	51.7
Republican	Dan Lungren (incumbent)	132,050	48.3
Majority		9,191	3.4
Total votes		273,291	100.0
Democratic gain from Republican			

==== Aftermath ====
In May 2016, Babulal Bera, Ami Bera's father, pleaded guilty to two felony counts of election fraud affecting the 2010 and 2012 elections, and was convicted of illegally funneling $250,000 to his son's campaigns between 2010 and 2012.

== District 8 ==
2012 California's 8th congressional district election
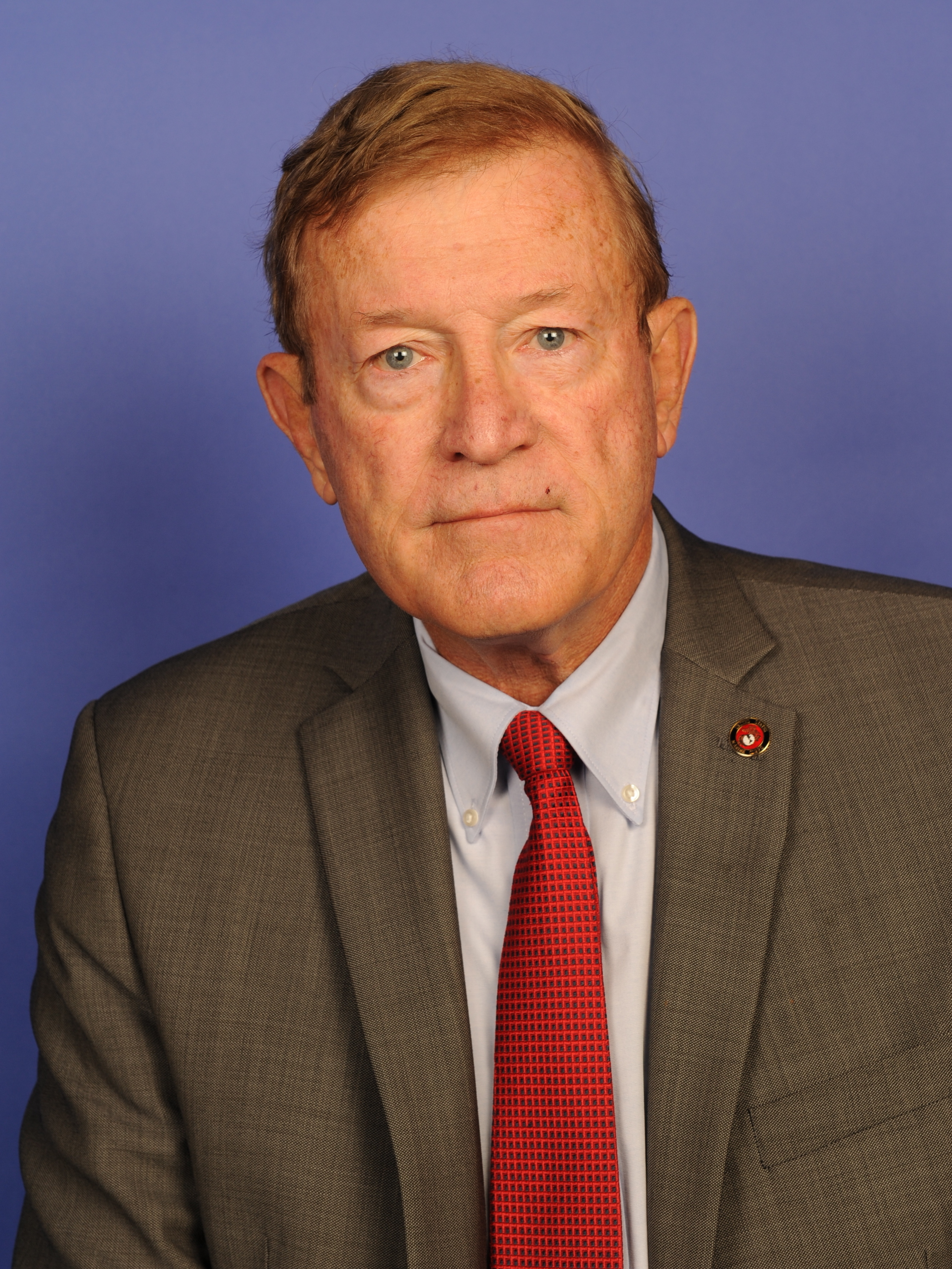

Candidate	Paul Cook	Gregg Imus
Party	Republican	Republican
Popular vote	103,093	76,551
Percentage	57.4%	42.6%
- County results Cook: 50–60% Imus: 50–60%
U.S. Representative before election
Jerry Lewis
Republican
Elected U.S. Representative
Paul Cook
Republican

The 8th district is based in the eastern High Desert and includes Victorville and Yucaipa. Incumbent Republican Jerry Lewis, who represented the 41st district from 2003 to 2013 and its predecessors since 1983, retired. The district had a PVI of R+12.

=== Primary election ===
==== Republican candidates ====
===== Advanced to general =====
- Paul Cook, state assembly member
- Gregg Imus, co-founder of the Minuteman Civil Defense Corps of California

===== Eliminated in primary =====
- Dennis Albertsen, computer scientist
- George Craig
- Bill Jensen, former mayor of Hesperia
- Phillip Liberatore, accountant
- Ryan McEachron, Mayor of Victorville;
- Brad Mitzelfelt, San Bernardino County Supervisor
- Joseph Napolitano
- Angela Valles, member of the Victorville City Council

===== Declined =====
- Jerry Lewis, incumbent U.S. representative

==== Democratic candidates ====
===== Eliminated in primary =====
- Jackie Conaway, law office manager and nominee for the 25th district in 2008 & 2010
- John Pinkerton, president of Victor Valley College Board of Trustees

==== Independent candidates ====
===== Eliminated in primary =====
- Anthony Adams, former Republican state assembly member

==== Campaign ====
Conaway was endorsed by the California Democratic Party in February 2012. In March 2012, the California Republican Party declined to endorse a candidate in the 8th district.

==== Results ====
Nonpartisan blanket primary results
Party	Candidate	Votes	%
Republican	Gregg Imus	12,754	15.6
Republican	Paul Cook	12,517	15.3
Republican	Phil Liberatore	12,277	15.0
Democratic	Jackie Conaway	11,674	14.3
Republican	Brad Mitzelfelt	8,801	10.8
Democratic	John Pinkerton	7,941	9.7
Republican	Angela Valles	4,924	6.0
Republican	Ryan McEachron	3,181	3.9
No party preference	Anthony Adams	2,750	3.4
Republican	Bill Jensen	1,850	2.3
Republican	George T. Craig	1,376	1.7
Republican	Joseph D. Napolitano	1,050	1.3
Republican	Dennis L. Albertsen	761	0.9
Total votes		81,856	100.0

==== Endorsements ====
Paul Cook (R)

Labor unions

- AFL-CIO
- National Association of Letter Carriers

Organizations

- NRA Political Victory Fund
- United States Chamber of Commerce
Gregg Imus (R)

Organizations

- Eagle Forum

==== Predictions ====
Source	Ranking	As of
The Cook Political Report	Safe R	November 5, 2012
Rothenberg	Safe R	November 2, 2012
Roll Call	Safe R	November 4, 2012
Sabato's Crystal Ball	Safe R	November 5, 2012
NY Times	Safe R	November 4, 2012
RCP	Safe R	November 4, 2012
The Hill	Safe R	November 4, 2012

==== Results ====
California's 8th congressional district election, 2012
Party	Candidate	Votes	%
Republican	Paul Cook	103,093	57.4
Republican	Gregg Imus	76,551	42.6
Total votes		179,644	100.0
Republican hold			

== District 9 ==
2012 California's 9th congressional district election

Candidate	Jerry McNerney	Ricky Gill
Party	Democratic	Republican
Popular vote	118,373	94,704
Percentage	55.6%	44.4%
- County results Mcnerney: 50–60% Gill: 50–60%
U.S. Representative before election
Jerry McNerney
Democratic
Elected U.S. Representative
Jerry McNerney
Democratic

The 9th district is based in the Central Valley and includes the San Joaquin Delta and Stockton. Incumbent Democrat Jerry McNerney, who represented the 11th district from 2007 to 2013, ran for re-election here. The district had a PVI of D+2.

=== Primary election ===
==== Democratic candidates ====
===== Advanced to general =====
- Jerry McNerney, incumbent U.S. representative

==== Republican candidates ====
===== Advanced to general =====
- Ricky Gill, student at the UC Berkeley School of Law and former member of the California State Board of Education

===== Eliminated in primary =====
- John McDonald, technology executive

===== Declined =====
- Tony Amador, retired US marshal and candidate for this seat in 2010
- Brad Goehring, farmer and candidate for this seat in 2010
- David Harmer, businessman and nominee for this seat in 2010

==== Campaign ====
Gill was endorsed by the California Republican Party in March 2012.

==== Endorsements ====
Jerry McNerney (D)

Labor unions

- AFL-CIO

==== Results ====
Nonpartisan blanket primary results
Party	Candidate	Votes	%
Democratic	Jerry McNerney (incumbent)	45,696	47.8
Republican	Ricky Gill	38,488	40.2
Republican	John McDonald	11,458	12.0
Total votes		95,642	100.0

=== General election ===
==== Endorsements ====
Jerry McNerney (D)

Labor unions

- AFL-CIO
- International Brotherhood of Boilermakers
- National Association of Letter Carriers

Organizations

- Democratic Congressional Campaign Committee "Frontline" Program
- Human Rights Campaign
- National Organization for Women
- Sierra Club
Ricky Gill (R)

Organizations

- National Republican Congressional Committee "Young Guns" Program
- National Right to Life Committee
- NRA Political Victory Fund
- United States Chamber of Commerce

==== Polling ====
Poll source	Date(s) administered	Sample size	Margin of error	Jerry McNerney (D)	Ricky Gill (R)	Undecided
Global Strategy Group (D-DCCC)	October 8–10, 2012	400 (LV)	± 4.9%	47%	38%	15%
Tarrance (R-Gill)	September 30–October 2, 2012	409 (LV)	± 4.9%	45%	46%	9%
Tarrance (R-Gill)	July 24–26, 2012	402 (LV)	± 5.7%	47%	45%	9%
Lake Research Partners (D-McNerney)	July 8–11, 2012	504 (LV)	± 4.6%	49%	33%	18%

==== Predictions ====
Source	Ranking	As of
The Cook Political Report	Tossup	November 5, 2012
Rothenberg	Tilt D	November 2, 2012
Roll Call	Tossup	November 4, 2012
Sabato's Crystal Ball	Lean D	November 5, 2012
NY Times	Lean D	November 4, 2012
RCP	Tossup	November 4, 2012
The Hill	Lean D	November 4, 2012

==== Results ====
California's 9th congressional district election, 2012
Party	Candidate	Votes	%
Democratic	Jerry McNerney (incumbent)	118,373	55.6
Republican	Ricky Gill	94,704	44.4
Majority		23,669	11.2
Total votes		213,077	100.0
Democratic hold			

== District 10 ==
2012 California's 10th congressional district election
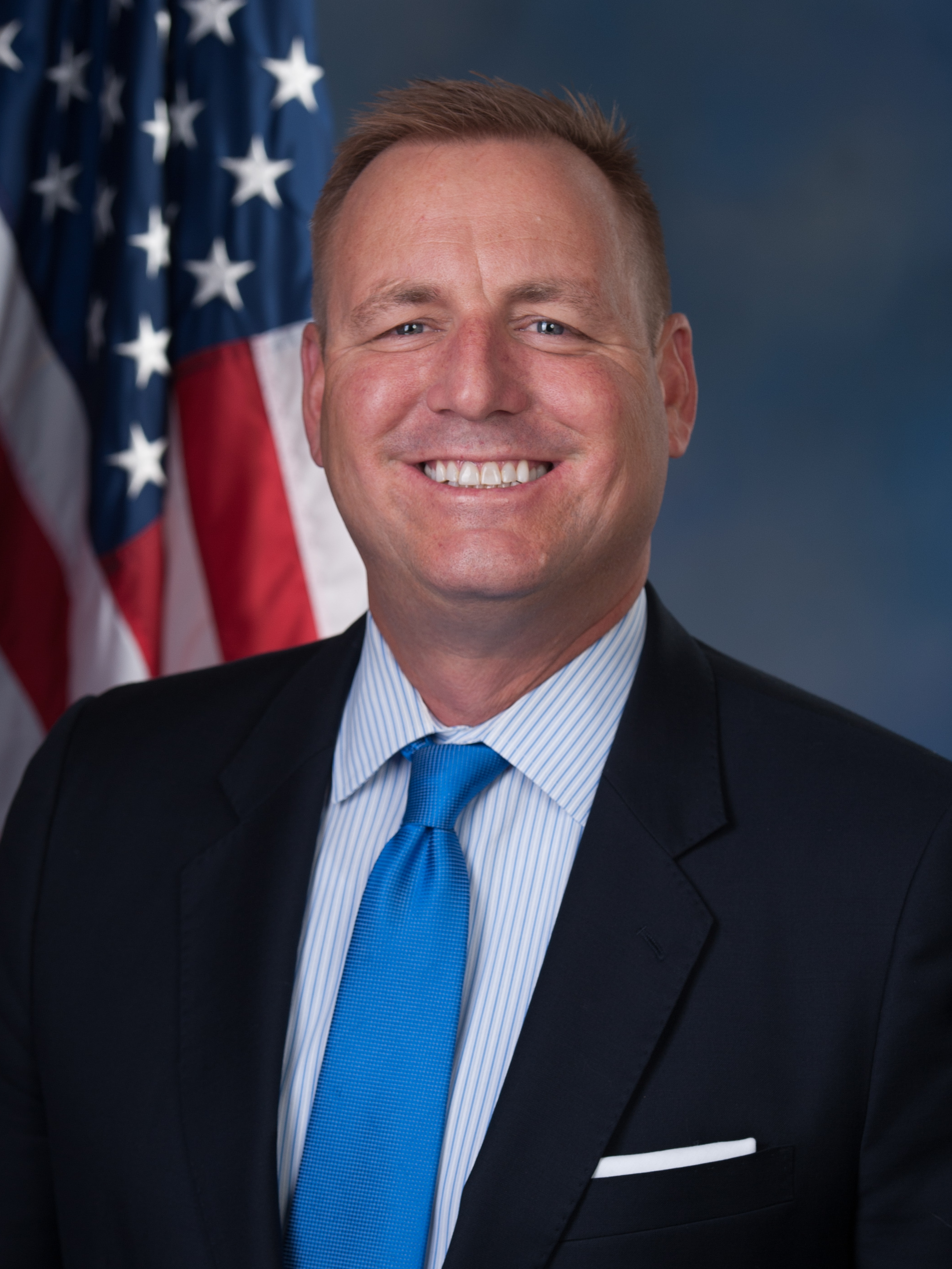

Candidate	Jeff Denham	José Hernández
Party	Republican	Democratic
Popular vote	110,265	98,934
Percentage	52.7%	47.3%
- County results Denham: 50–60%
U.S. Representative before election
Jeff Denham
Republican
Elected U.S. Representative
Jeff Denham
Republican

The 10th district is based in the Central Valley and includes Modesto and Tracy. Incumbent Democrat Dennis Cardoza, who represented the 18th district from 2003 to 2013, retired. Incumbent Republican Jeff Denham, who represented the 19th district from 2011 to 2013, ran for re-election here. The district had a PVI of R+5.

=== Primary election ===
==== Republican candidates ====
===== Advanced to general =====
- Jeff Denham, incumbent U.S. representative for the 19th district

==== Democratic candidates ====
===== Advanced to general =====
- José Hernández, former NASA astronaut

===== Eliminated in primary =====
- Mike Barkley, lawyer and certified public accountant

===== Declined =====
- Dennis Cardoza, incumbent U.S. representative for the 18th district

==== Independent candidates ====
===== Eliminated in primary =====
- Chad Condit, son of former U.S. Representative Gary Condit
- Troy McComack, small business owner

==== Campaign ====
Hernandez was endorsed by the California Democratic Party in February 2012.

==== Endorsements ====
José Hernández (D)

Labor unions

- AFL-CIO

==== Results ====
Nonpartisan blanket primary results
Party	Candidate	Votes	%
Republican	Jeff Denham (incumbent)	45,779	49.2
Democratic	José Hernández	26,072	28.0
No party preference	Chad M. Condit	13,983	15.0
Democratic	Michael J. "Mike" Barkley	5,028	5.4
No party preference	Troy Wayne McComack	2,114	2.3
Total votes		92,976	100.0

=== General election ===
==== Endorsements ====
Jeff Denham (R)

Organizations

- Campaign for Working Families
- National Republican Congressional Committee "Patriot" Program
- National Right to Life Committee
- NRA Political Victory Fund
- United States Chamber of Commerce
José Hernández (D)

Labor unions

- AFL-CIO
- International Brotherhood of Boilermakers
- National Association of Letter Carriers

Organizations

- Democracy for America
- Democratic Congressional Campaign Committee "Red to Blue" Program
- Human Rights Campaign
- Sierra Club

==== Polling ====
Poll source	Date(s) administered	Sample size	Margin of error	Jeff Denham (R)	José Hernández (D)	Undecided
Momentum Analysis (D-Hernandez)	September 29– October 1, 2012	500 (LV)	± 4.5%	45%	43%	12%
DCCC (D)	September 10, 2012	382 (LV)	± 5.0%	44%	46%	11%
Public Policy Polling (D-Democracy for America)	August 7–9, 2012	751 (LV)	± ?%	48%	41%	12%

==== Predictions ====
Source	Ranking	As of
The Cook Political Report	Tossup	November 5, 2012
Rothenberg	Tilts R	November 2, 2012
Roll Call	Tossup	November 4, 2012
Sabato's Crystal Ball	Lean R	November 5, 2012
NY Times	Lean R	November 4, 2012
RCP	Tossup	November 4, 2012
The Hill	Tossup	November 4, 2012

==== Results ====
California's 10th congressional district election, 2012
Party	Candidate	Votes	%
Republican	Jeff Denham (incumbent)	110,265	52.7
Democratic	José Hernández	98,934	47.3
Majority		11,331	5.4
Total votes		209,199	100.0
Republican hold			

== District 11 ==
2012 California's 11th congressional district election
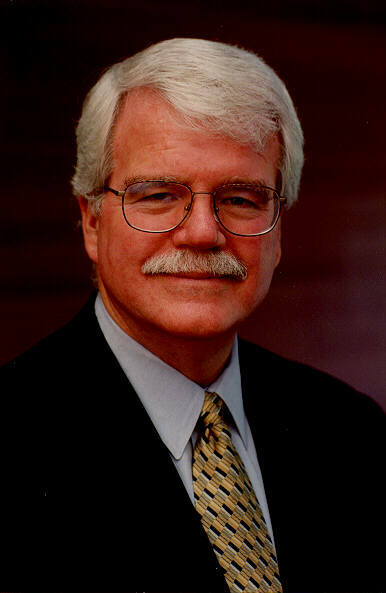

Candidate	George Miller	Virginia Fuller
Party	Democratic	Republican
Popular vote	200,743	87,136
Percentage	69.7%	30.3%
- County results Miller: 60–70%
U.S. Representative before election
George Miller
Democratic
Elected U.S. Representative
George Miller
Democratic

The 11th district is based in the East Bay and includes Concord and Richmond. Incumbent Democrat George Miller, who represented the 7th district from 1975 to 2013, ran for re-election here. The district had a PVI of D+17.

=== Primary election ===
==== Democratic candidates ====
===== Advanced to general =====
- George Miller, incumbent U.S. representative

===== Eliminated in primary =====
- John Fitzgerald, small business owner
- Cheryl Sudduth, public policy advocate

==== Republican candidates ====
===== Advanced to general =====
- Virginia Fuller, nurse

==== Campaign ====
Miller received the endorsement of the California Democratic Party in February 2012.

==== Endorsements ====
George Miller (D)

Labor unions

- AFL-CIO

==== Results ====
Nonpartisan blanket primary results
Party	Candidate	Votes	%
Democratic	George Miller (incumbent)	76,163	58.5
Republican	Virginia Fuller	40,333	31.0
Democratic	John Fitzgerald	9,092	7.0
Democratic	Cheryl Sudduth	4,635	3.6
Total votes		130,223	100.0

=== General election ===
==== Endorsements ====
George Miller (D)

Labor unions

- AFL-CIO
- International Brotherhood of Boilermakers
- National Association of Letter Carriers

Organizations

- Human Rights Campaign
- National Organization for Women
- Sierra Club

==== Predictions ====
Source	Ranking	As of
The Cook Political Report	Safe D	November 5, 2012
Rothenberg	Safe D	November 2, 2012
Roll Call	Safe D	November 4, 2012
Sabato's Crystal Ball	Safe D	November 5, 2012
NY Times	Safe D	November 4, 2012
RCP	Safe D	November 4, 2012
The Hill	Safe D	November 4, 2012

==== Results ====
California's 11th congressional district election, 2012
Party	Candidate	Votes	%
Democratic	George Miller (incumbent)	200,743	69.7
Republican	Virginia Fuller	87,136	30.3
Total votes		287,879	100.0
Democratic hold			

== District 12 ==
2012 California's 12th congressional district election
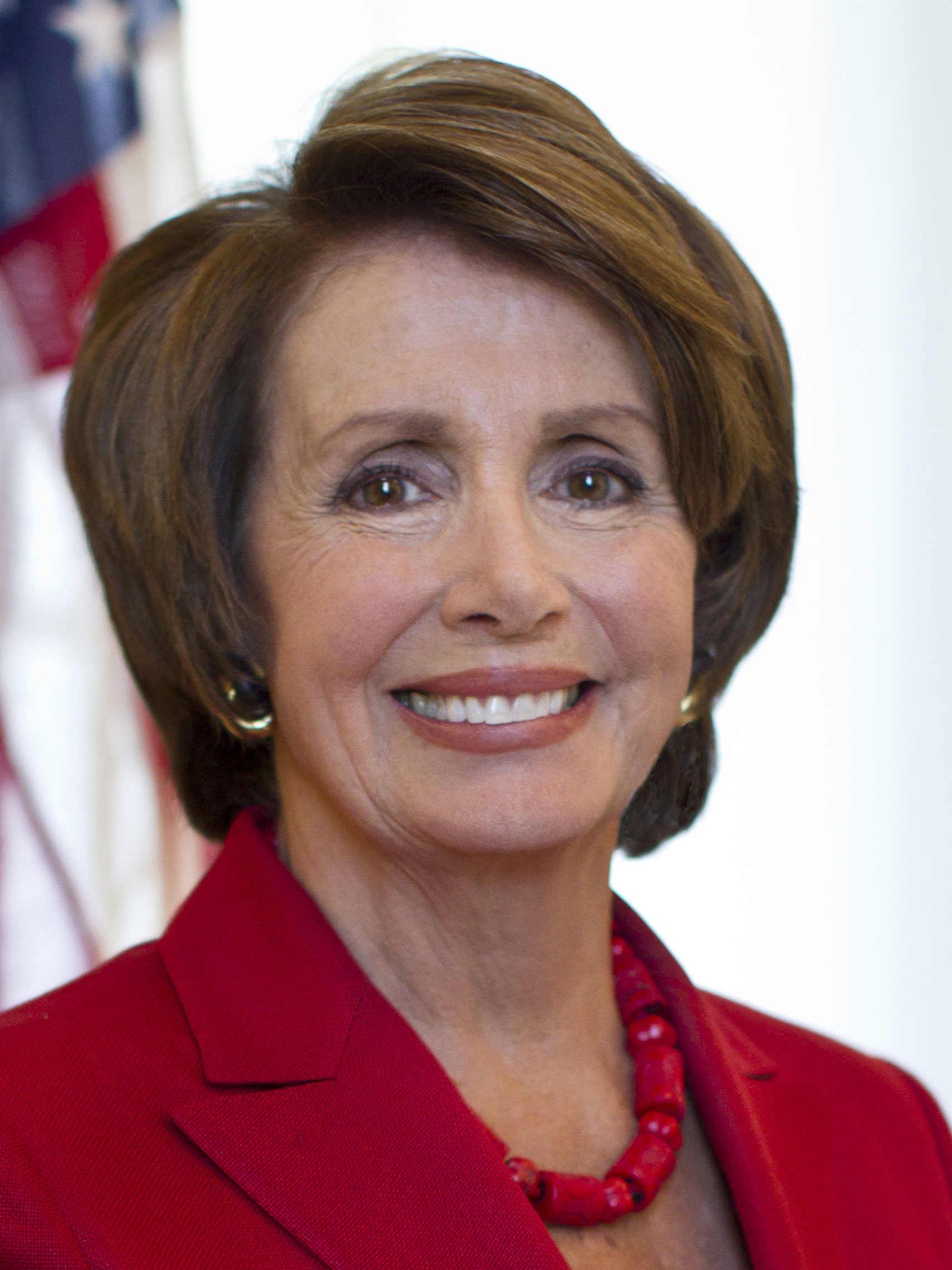

Candidate	Nancy Pelosi	John Dennis
Party	Democratic	Republican
Popular vote	253,709	44,478
Percentage	85.1%	14.9%
- County results Pelosi: 80–90%
U.S. Representative before election
Nancy Pelosi
Democratic
Elected U.S. Representative
Nancy Pelosi
Democratic

The 12th district is based in the Bay Area and includes most of San Francisco. House Democratic Leader and former Speaker Nancy Pelosi, who represented the 8th district from 1993 to 2013 and previously represented the 5th district from 1987 until 1993, ran for re-election here. The district had a PVI of D+35.

=== Primary election ===
==== Democratic candidates ====
===== Advanced to general =====
- Nancy Pelosi, incumbent U.S. representative and House Minority Leader

===== Eliminated in primary =====
- Americo Artura Diaz, self-employed designer
- David Peterson, businessman
- Summer Justice Shields

==== Republican candidates ====
===== Advanced to general =====
- John Dennis, real estate developer

==== Green candidates ====
===== Eliminated in primary =====
- Barry Hermanson

==== Campaign ====
Pelosi was endorsed by the California Democratic Party in February 2012.

==== Endorsements ====
Nancy Pelosi (D)

Labor unions

- AFL-CIO

==== Results ====
Nonpartisan blanket primary results
Party	Candidate	Votes	%
Democratic	Nancy Pelosi (incumbent)	89,446	74.9
Republican	John Dennis	16,206	13.6
Green	Barry Hermanson	6,398	5.4
Democratic	David Peterson	3,756	3.1
Democratic	Summer Justice Shields	2,146	1.9
Democratic	Américo Arturo Díaz	1,499	1.3
Total votes		119,451	100.0

=== General election ===
==== Endorsements ====
Nancy Pelosi (D)

Labor unions

- AFL-CIO
- International Brotherhood of Boilermakers
- National Association of Letter Carriers

Organizations

- Human Rights Campaign
- National Organization for Women
- Sierra Club
John Dennis (R)

Organizations

- GOProud
- Republican Liberty Caucus

==== Predictions ====
Source	Ranking	As of
The Cook Political Report	Safe D	November 5, 2012
Rothenberg	Safe D	November 2, 2012
Roll Call	Safe D	November 4, 2012
Sabato's Crystal Ball	Safe D	November 5, 2012
NY Times	Safe D	November 4, 2012
RCP	Safe D	November 4, 2012
The Hill	Safe D	November 4, 2012

==== Results ====
California's 12th congressional district election, 2012
Party	Candidate	Votes	%
Democratic	Nancy Pelosi (incumbent)	253,709	85.1
Republican	John Dennis	44,478	14.9
Total votes		298,187	100.0
Democratic hold			

== District 13 ==
2012 California's 13th congressional district election
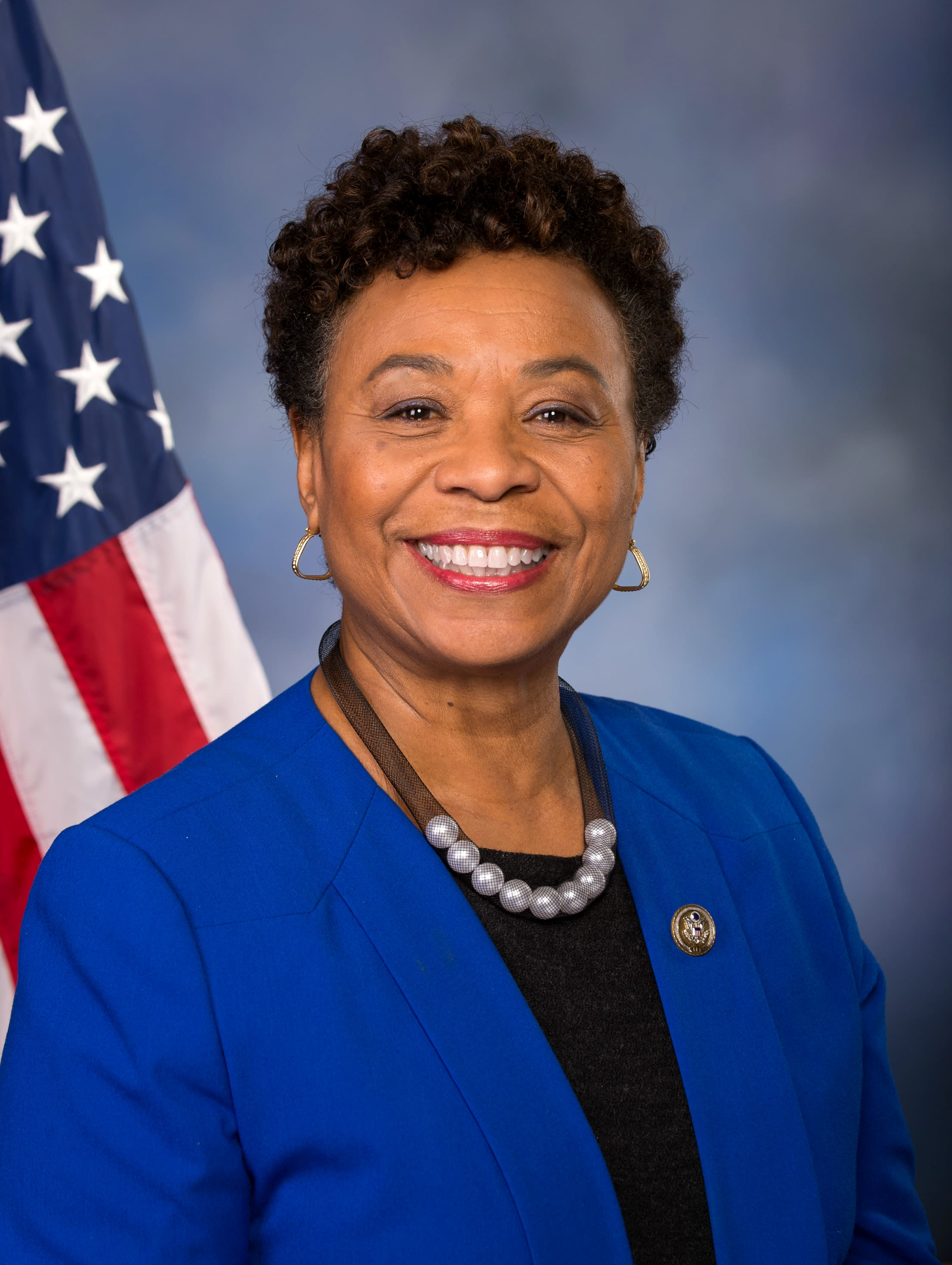

Candidate	Barbara Lee	Marilyn M. Singleton
Party	Democratic	No party preference
Popular vote	250,436	38,146
Percentage	86.8%	13.2%
- County results Lee: 80–90%
U.S. Representative before election
Barbara Lee
Democratic
Elected U.S. Representative
Barbara Lee
Democratic

The 13th district is based in the East Bay and includes Berkeley and Oakland. Democrat Barbara Lee, who represented the 9th district from 1998 to 2013, ran for re-election here. The district had a PVI of D+37.

=== Primary election ===
==== Democratic candidates ====
===== Advanced to general =====
- Barbara Lee, incumbent U.S. representative

===== Eliminated in primary =====
- Justin Jelincic

==== Independent candidates ====
===== Advanced to general =====
- Marilyn Singleton, physician

==== Campaign ====
Lee received the endorsement of the California Democratic Party in February 2012.

==== Endorsements ====
Barbara Lee (D)

Labor unions

- AFL-CIO

==== Results ====
Nonpartisan blanket primary results
Party	Candidate	Votes	%
Democratic	Barbara Lee (incumbent)	94,709	83.1
No party preference	Marilyn M. Singleton	13,502	11.8
Democratic	Justin Jelincic	5,741	5.0
Total votes		113,952	100.0

=== General election ===
==== Endorsements ====
Barbara Lee (D)

Labor unions

- AFL-CIO
- International Brotherhood of Boilermakers
- National Association of Letter Carriers

Organizations

- Human Rights Campaign
- National Organization for Women
- Progressive Democrats of America
- Sierra Club

==== Predictions ====
Source	Ranking	As of
The Cook Political Report	Safe D	November 5, 2012
Rothenberg	Safe D	November 2, 2012
Roll Call	Safe D	November 4, 2012
Sabato's Crystal Ball	Safe D	November 5, 2012
NY Times	Safe D	November 4, 2012
RCP	Safe D	November 4, 2012
The Hill	Safe D	November 4, 2012

==== Results ====
California's 13th congressional district election, 2012
Party	Candidate	Votes	%
Democratic	Barbara Lee (incumbent)	250,436	86.8
No party preference	Marilyn M. Singleton	38,146	13.2
Total votes		288,582	100.0
Democratic hold			

== District 14 ==
2012 California's 14th congressional district election
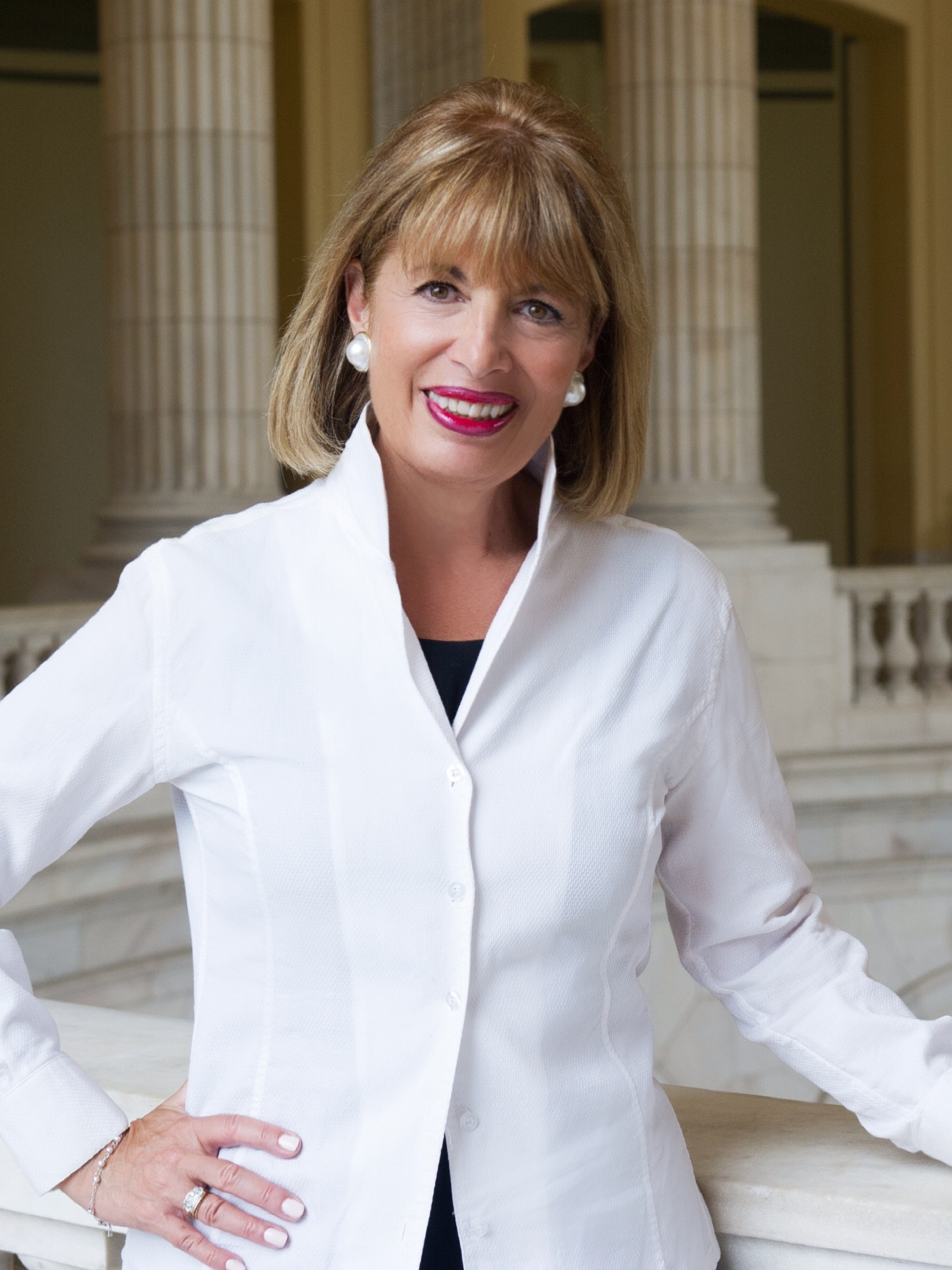

Candidate	Jackie Speier	Deborah Bacigalupi
Party	Democratic	Republican
Popular vote	203,828	54,455
Percentage	78.9%	21.1%
- County results Speier: 70–80% 80–90%
U.S. Representative before election
Jackie Speier
Democratic
Elected U.S. Representative
Jackie Speier
Democratic

The 14th district is based in the Bay Area and includes most of San Mateo County. Incumbent Democrat Jackie Speier, who represented the 12th district from 2008 to 2013, ran for re-election here. The district had a PVI of D+23.

=== Primary election ===
==== Democratic candidates ====
===== Advanced to general =====
- Jackie Speier, incumbent U.S. representative

===== Eliminated in primary =====
- Mike Maloney, perennial candidate

==== Republican candidates ====
===== Advanced to general =====
- Deborah Bacigalupi, businesswoman

==== Campaign ====
Speier was endorsed by the California Democratic Party in February 2012.

==== Endorsements ====
Jackie Speier (D)

Labor unions

- AFL-CIO

==== Results ====
Nonpartisan blanket primary results
Party	Candidate	Votes	%
Democratic	Jackie Speier (incumbent)	80,850	74.3
Republican	Deborah Bacigalupi	23,299	21.4
Democratic	Michael J. Moloney	4,607	4.2
Total votes		108,756	100.0

=== General election ===
==== Endorsements ====
Jackie Speier (D)

Labor unions

- AFL-CIO
- International Brotherhood of Boilermakers
- National Association of Letter Carriers

Organizations

- Human Rights Campaign
- National Organization for Women
- Sierra Club
Deborah Bacigalupi (R)

Organizations

- Eagle Forum

==== Predictions ====
Source	Ranking	As of
The Cook Political Report	Safe D	November 5, 2012
Rothenberg	Safe D	November 2, 2012
Roll Call	Safe D	November 4, 2012
Sabato's Crystal Ball	Safe D	November 5, 2012
NY Times	Safe D	November 4, 2012
RCP	Safe D	November 4, 2012
The Hill	Safe D	November 4, 2012

==== Results ====
California's 14th congressional district election, 2012
Party	Candidate	Votes	%
Democratic	Jackie Speier (incumbent)	203,828	78.9
Republican	Deborah Bacigalupi	54,455	21.1
Total votes		258,283	100.0
Democratic hold			

== District 15 ==
2012 California's 15th congressional district election
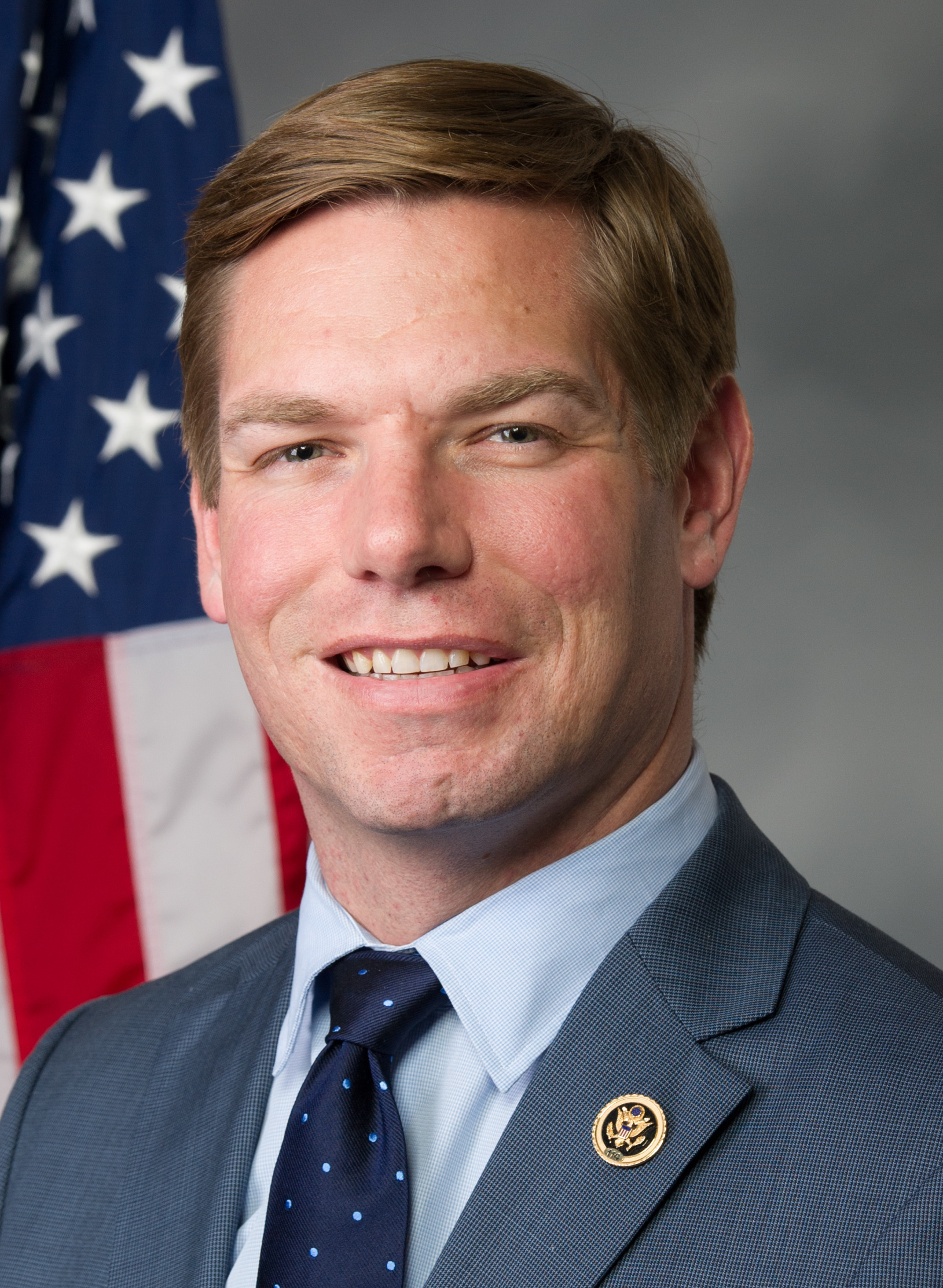

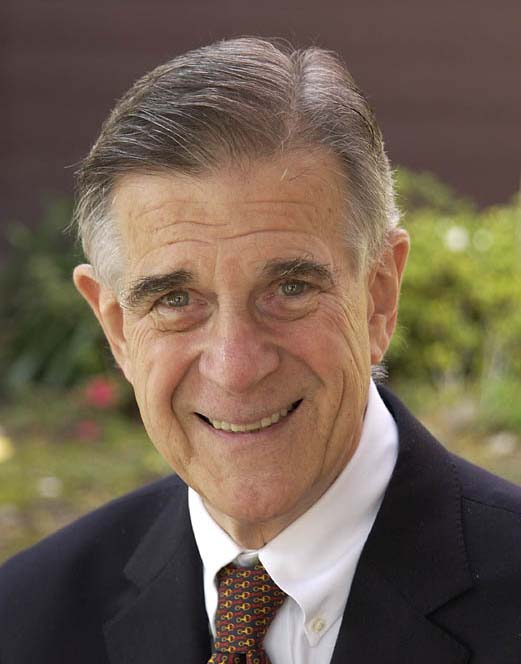
Candidate	Eric Swalwell	Pete Stark
Party	Democratic	Democratic
Popular vote	120,388	110,646
Percentage	52.1%	47.9%
U.S. Representative before election
Pete Stark
Democratic
Elected U.S. Representative
Eric Swalwell
Democratic

The 15th district is based in the East Bay and includes Hayward and Livermore. Incumbent Democrat Pete Stark, who represented the 13th district from 1993 to 2013 and its predecessors since 1973, ran for re-election here. The district had a PVI of D+15.

=== Primary election ===
==== Democratic candidates ====
===== Advanced to general =====
- Pete Stark, incumbent U.S. representative
- Eric Swalwell, Alameda County deputy district attorney and member of the Dublin city council

==== Independent candidates ====
===== Eliminated in primary =====
- Christopher Pareja, businessman

==== Campaign ====
Stark received the endorsement of the California Democratic Party in February 2012. Swalwell won the Tri Valley Democratic Club's Straw Poll on February 20.

==== Endorsements ====
Pete Stark (D)

Labor unions

- AFL-CIO

==== Results ====
Nonpartisan blanket primary results
Party	Candidate	Votes	%
Democratic	Pete Stark (incumbent)	39,943	42.1
Democratic	Eric Swalwell	34,347	36.0
No party preference	Christopher "Chris" J. Pareja	20,618	21.7
Total votes		94,908	100.0

=== General election ===
==== Endorsements ====
Pete Stark (D)

Labor unions

- AFL-CIO
- International Brotherhood of Boilermakers
- National Association of Letter Carriers

Organizations

- Human Rights Campaign
- Sierra Club

==== Predictions ====
Source	Ranking	As of
The Cook Political Report	Safe D	November 5, 2012
Rothenberg	Safe D	November 2, 2012
Roll Call	Safe D	November 4, 2012
Sabato's Crystal Ball	Safe D	November 5, 2012
NY Times	Safe D	November 4, 2012
RCP	Safe D	November 4, 2012
The Hill	Safe D	November 4, 2012

==== Results ====
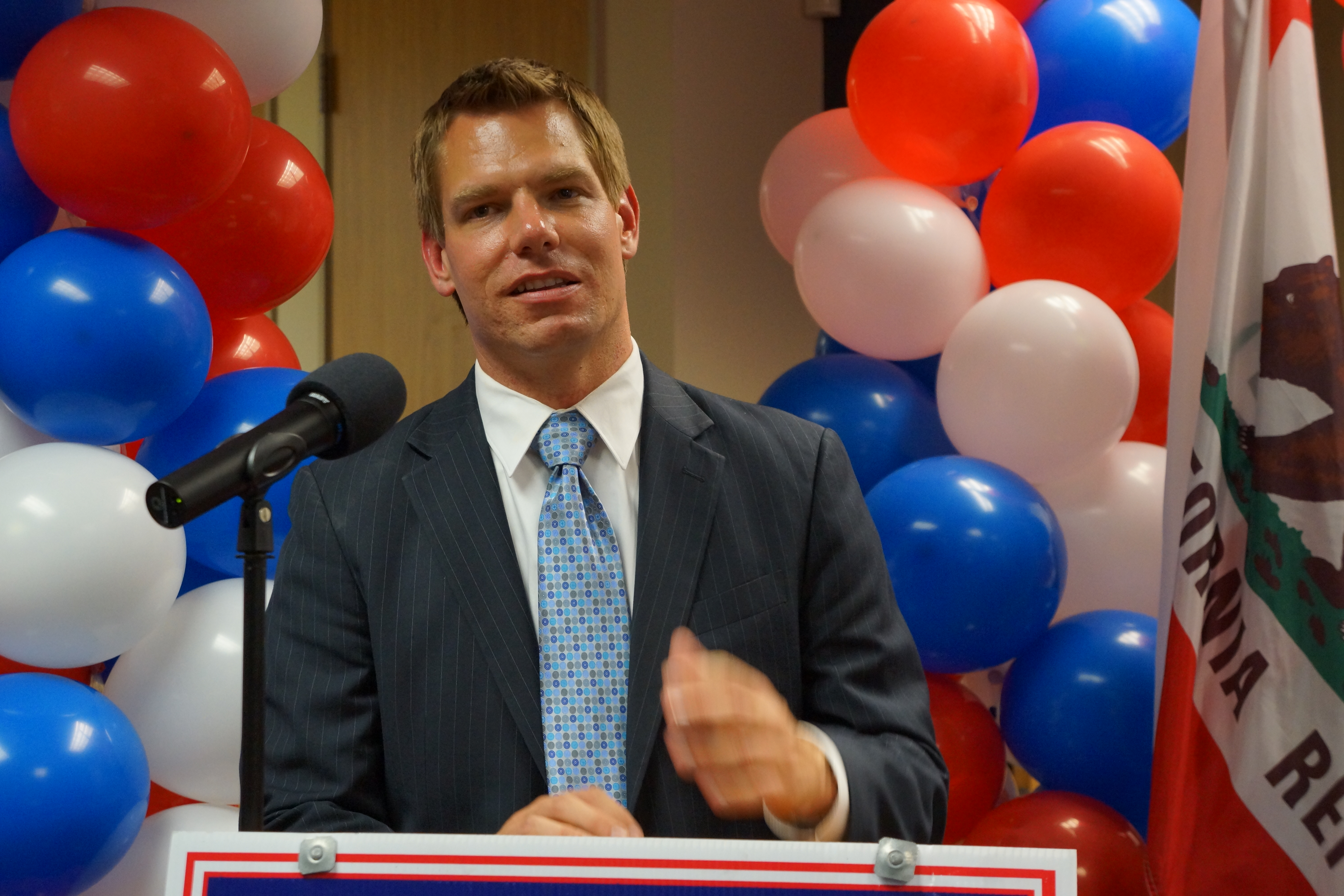
Swalwell giving his victory speech

California's 15th congressional district election, 2012
Party	Candidate	Votes	%
Democratic	Eric Swalwell	120,388	52.1
Democratic	Pete Stark (incumbent)	110,646	47.9
Majority		9,742	4.2
Total votes		231,034	100.0
Democratic hold			

== District 16 ==
2012 California's 16th congressional district election
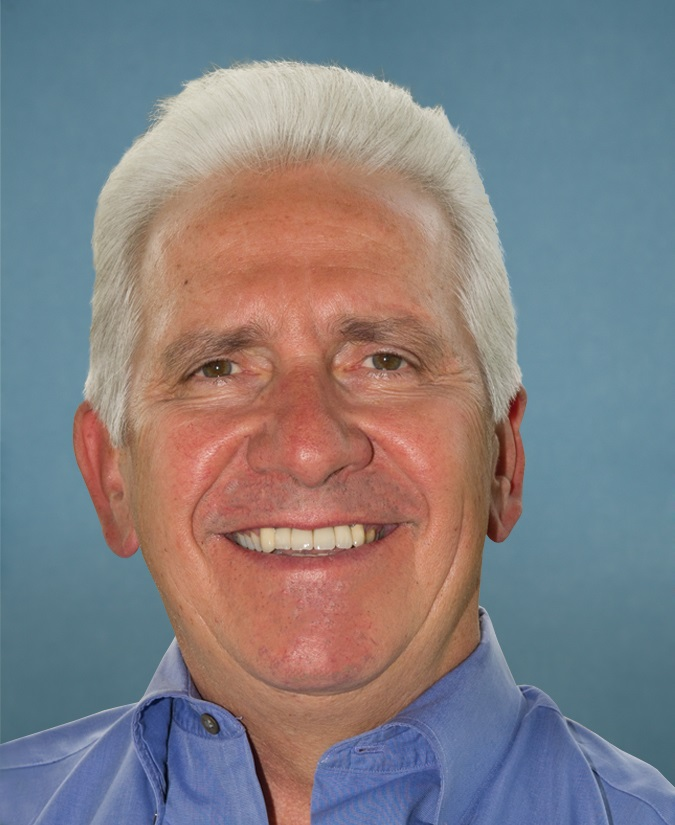

Candidate	Jim Costa	Brian Daniel Whelan
Party	Democratic	Republican
Popular vote	84,649	62,801
Percentage	57.4%	42.6%
- County results Costa: 50–60% 60–70% Whelan: 50–60%
U.S. Representative before election
Jim Costa
Democratic
Elected U.S. Representative
Jim Costa
Democratic

The 16th district is based in the Central Valley and includes Fresno and Merced. Incumbent Democrat Jim Costa, who represented the 20th district from 2005 to 2013, ran for re-election here. The district had a PVI of D+2.

=== Primary election ===
==== Democratic candidates ====
===== Advanced to general =====
- Jim Costa, incumbent U.S. representative

===== Eliminated in primary =====
- Loraine Goodwin, physician and member of the California Democratic State Central Committee

===== Declined =====
- Dennis Cardoza, incumbent U.S. representative for the 18th district

==== Republican candidates ====
===== Advanced to general =====
- Brian Whelan, farmer and attorney

===== Eliminated in primary =====
- Mark Garcia, small business owner
- Johnny Tacherra, farmer

===== Declined =====
- Jeff Denham, incumbent U.S. representative for the 19th district
- Case Lawrence, entrepreneur
- Clint Olivier, member of the Fresno City Council
- Jim Patterson, former mayor of Fresno
- Mark Pazin, Merced County sheriff
- Andy Vidak, farmer and nominee for this seat in 2010

==== Endorsements ====
Jim Costa (D)

Labor unions

- AFL-CIO

Organizations

- Blue Dog Coalition

==== Results ====
Nonpartisan blanket primary results
Party	Candidate	Votes	%
Democratic	Jim Costa (incumbent)	25,355	42.7
Republican	Brian Daniel Whelan	15,053	25.3
Republican	Johnny M. Tacherra	6,776	11.4
Republican	Mark Garcia	6,529	11.0
Democratic	Loraine Goodwin	5,703	9.6
Total votes		59,416	100.0

=== General election ===
==== Endorsements ====
Jim Costa (D)

Labor unions

- AFL-CIO
- International Brotherhood of Boilermakers
- National Association of Letter Carriers

Organizations

- Blue Dog Coalition
- United States Chamber of Commerce
Brian Whelan (R)

Organizations

- National Republican Congressional Committee "Contender" Program
- National Right to Life Committee

==== Predictions ====
Source	Ranking	As of
The Cook Political Report	Safe D	November 5, 2012
Rothenberg	Safe D	November 2, 2012
Roll Call	Safe D	November 4, 2012
Sabato's Crystal Ball	Safe D	November 5, 2012
NY Times	Lean D	November 4, 2012
RCP	Safe D	November 4, 2012
The Hill	Likely D	November 4, 2012

==== Results ====
California's 16th congressional district election, 2012
Party	Candidate	Votes	%
Democratic	Jim Costa (incumbent)	84,649	57.4
Republican	Brian Daniel Whelan	62,801	42.6
Majority		21,848	14.8
Total votes		147,450	100.0
Democratic hold			

== District 17 ==
2012 California's 17th congressional district election
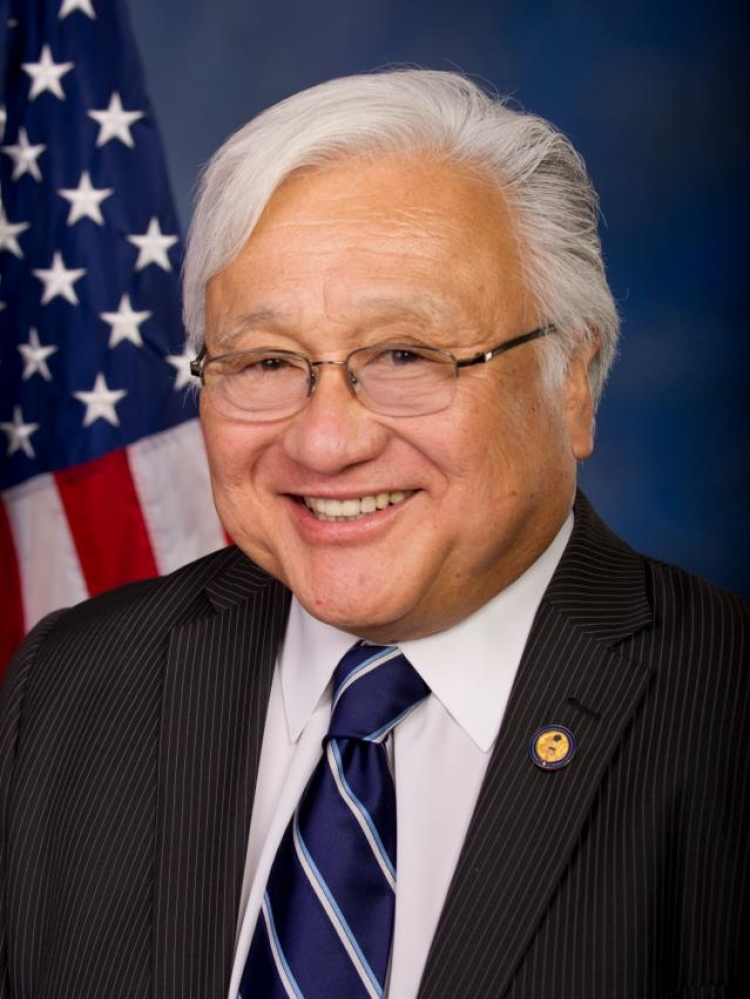

Candidate	Mike Honda	Evelyn Li
Party	Democratic	Republican
Popular vote	159,392	57,336
Percentage	73.5%	26.5%
- County results Honda: 70–80%
U.S. Representative before election
Mike Honda
Democratic
Elected U.S. Representative
Mike Honda
Democratic

The 17th district is based in the Bay Area and includes Sunnyvale, Cupertino, Santa Clara, Fremont, and Milpitas. Democrat Mike Honda, who represented the 15th district from 2001 to 2013, ran for re-election here.

Charles Richardson ran as a Libertarian Party candidate.

=== Primary election ===
==== Democratic candidates ====
===== Advanced to general =====
- Mike Honda, incumbent U.S. representative

==== Republican candidates ====
===== Advanced to general =====
- Evelyn Li, cardiologist and founder of patient advocate organization

==== Campaign ====
Honda received the endorsement of the California Democratic Party in February 2012. Li was endorsed by the California Republican Party in March 2012.

==== Results ====
Nonpartisan blanket primary results
Party	Candidate	Votes	%
Democratic	Mike Honda (incumbent)	60,252	66.7
Republican	Evelyn Li	24,916	27.6
No party preference	Charles Richardson	5,163	5.7
Total votes		90,331	100.0

=== General election ===
==== Endorsements ====
Mike Honda (D)

Labor unions

- AFL-CIO
- International Brotherhood of Boilermakers
- National Association of Letter Carriers

Organizations

- Human Rights Campaign
- National Organization for Women
- Sierra Club

==== Predictions ====
Source	Ranking	As of
The Cook Political Report	Safe D	November 5, 2012
Rothenberg	Safe D	November 2, 2012
Roll Call	Safe D	November 4, 2012
Sabato's Crystal Ball	Safe D	November 5, 2012
NY Times	Safe D	November 4, 2012
RCP	Safe D	November 4, 2012
The Hill	Safe D	November 4, 2012

==== Results ====
California's 17th congressional district election, 2012
Party	Candidate	Votes	%
Democratic	Mike Honda (incumbent)	159,392	73.5
Republican	Evelyn Li	57,336	26.5
Total votes		216,728	100.0
Democratic hold			

== District 18 ==
2012 California's 18th congressional district election
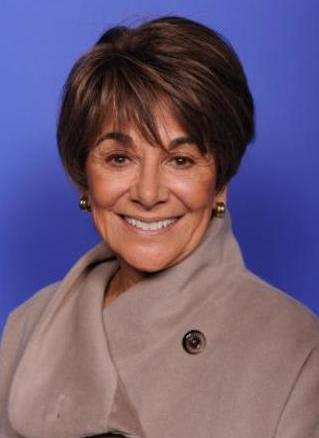

Candidate	Anna Eshoo	Dave Chapman
Party	Democratic	Republican
Popular vote	212,831	89,103
Percentage	70.5%	29.5%
- County results Eshoo: 60–70% 70–80%
U.S. Representative before election
Anna Eshoo
Democratic
Elected U.S. Representative
Anna Eshoo
Democratic

The 18th district is based in the Bay Area and includes Palo Alto, Redwood City, and Saratoga. Democrat Anna Eshoo, who represented the 14th district from 1993 to 2013, ran for re-election.

=== Primary election ===
==== Democratic candidates ====
===== Advanced to general =====
- Anna Eshoo, incumbent U.S. representative

===== Eliminated in primary =====
- William Parks

==== Republican candidates ====
===== Advanced to general =====
- Dave Chapman, nominee for this seat in 2010

==== Green candidates ====
===== Eliminated in primary =====
- Carol Brouillet, part of the Occupy movement

==== Campaign ====
Eshoo was endorsed by the California Democratic Party in February 2012. Chapman received the endorsement of the California Republican Party in March 2012.

==== Endorsements ====
Anna Eshoo (D)

Labor unions

- AFL-CIO

==== Results ====
Nonpartisan blanket primary results
Party	Candidate	Votes	%
Democratic	Anna Eshoo (incumbent)	86,851	61.5
Republican	Dave Chapman	42,174	29.8
Democratic	William Parks	6,504	4.6
Green	Carol Brouillet	5,777	4.1
Total votes		141,306	100.0

=== General election ===
==== Endorsements ====
Anna Eshoo (D)

Labor unions

- AFL-CIO
- International Brotherhood of Boilermakers
- National Association of Letter Carriers

Organizations

- Human Rights Campaign
- National Organization for Women
- Sierra Club

==== Predictions ====
Source	Ranking	As of
The Cook Political Report	Safe D	November 5, 2012
Rothenberg	Safe D	November 2, 2012
Roll Call	Safe D	November 4, 2012
Sabato's Crystal Ball	Safe D	November 5, 2012
NY Times	Safe D	November 4, 2012
RCP	Safe D	November 4, 2012
The Hill	Safe D	November 4, 2012

==== Results ====
California's 18th congressional district election, 2012
Party	Candidate	Votes	%
Democratic	Anna Eshoo (incumbent)	212,831	70.5
Republican	Dave Chapman	89,103	29.5
Total votes		301,934	100.0
Democratic hold			

== District 19 ==
2012 California's 19th congressional district election
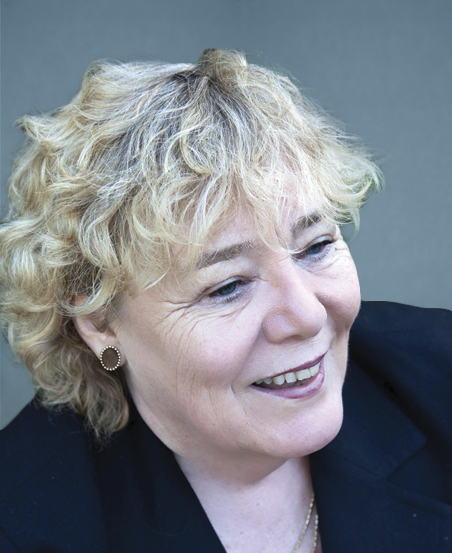

Candidate	Zoe Lofgren	Robert Murray
Party	Democratic	Republican
Popular vote	162,300	59,313
Percentage	73.2%	26.8%
- County results Lofgren: 70–80%
U.S. Representative before election
Zoe Lofgren
Democratic
Elected U.S. Representative
Zoe Lofgren
Democratic

The 19th district is based in the South Bay and includes most of San Jose. Democrat Zoe Lofgren, who represented the 16th district from 1995 to 2013, ran for re-election here.

=== Primary election ===
==== Democratic candidates ====
===== Advanced to general =====
- Zoe Lofgren, incumbent U.S. representative

==== Republican candidates ====
===== Advanced to general =====
- Robert Murray

===== Eliminated in primary =====
- Phat Nguyen

==== Campaign ====
Lofgren received the endorsement of the California Democratic Party in February 2012. Murray was endorsed by the California Republican Party in March 2012.

==== Endorsements ====
Zoe Lofgren (D)

Labor unions

- AFL-CIO

==== Results ====
Nonpartisan blanket primary results
Party	Candidate	Votes	%
Democratic	Zoe Lofgren (incumbent)	60,726	65.2
Republican	Robert Murray	21,421	23.0
Republican	Phat Nguyen	7,192	7.7
No party preference	Jay Cabrera	3,829	4.1
Total votes		93,168	100.0

=== General election ===
==== Endorsements ====
Zoe Lofgren (D)

Labor unions

- AFL-CIO
- International Brotherhood of Boilermakers
- National Association of Letter Carriers

Organizations

- Human Rights Campaign
- National Organization for Women
- Sierra Club

==== Predictions ====
Source	Ranking	As of
The Cook Political Report	Safe D	November 5, 2012
Rothenberg	Safe D	November 2, 2012
Roll Call	Safe D	November 4, 2012
Sabato's Crystal Ball	Safe D	November 5, 2012
NY Times	Safe D	November 4, 2012
RCP	Safe D	November 4, 2012
The Hill	Safe D	November 4, 2012

==== Results ====
California's 19th congressional district election, 2012
Party	Candidate	Votes	%
Democratic	Zoe Lofgren (incumbent)	162,300	73.2
Republican	Robert Murray	59,313	26.8
Total votes		221,613	100.0
Democratic hold			

== District 20 ==
2012 California's 20th congressional district election
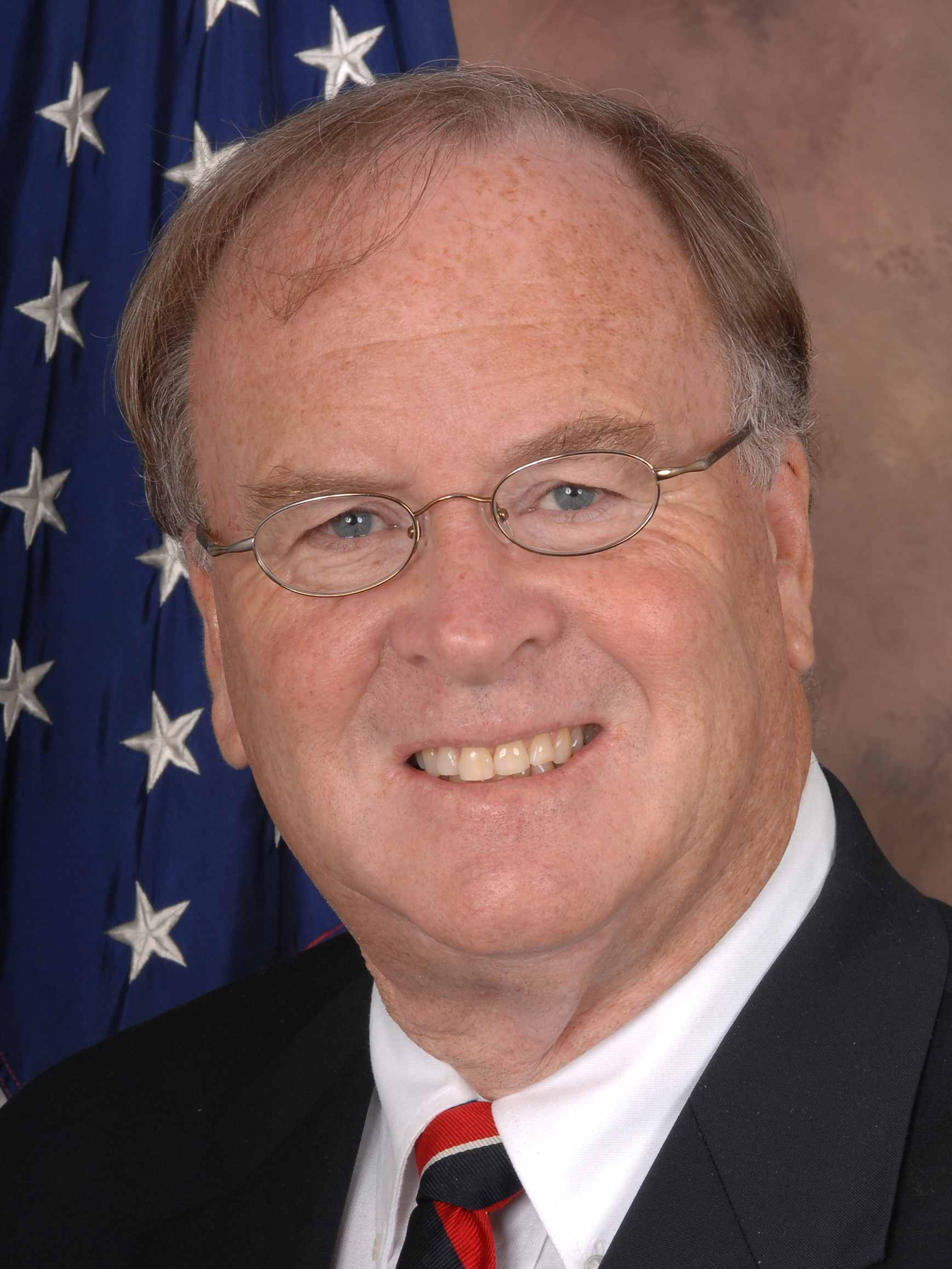

Candidate	Sam Farr	Jeff Taylor
Party	Democratic	Republican
Popular vote	172,996	60,566
Percentage	74.1%	25.9%
- County results Farr: 60–70% 70–80% 80–90%
U.S. Representative before election
Sam Farr
Democratic
Elected U.S. Representative
Sam Farr
Democratic

The 20th district is based in the Central Coast and includes Monterey and Santa Cruz. Democrat Sam Farr, who represented the 17th district from 1993 to 2013, ran for re-election here.

=== Primary election ===
==== Democratic candidates ====
===== Advanced to general =====
- Sam Farr, incumbent U.S. representative

===== Eliminated in primary =====
- Art Dunn, vice president of Ansavoice Communications

==== Republican candidates ====
===== Advanced to general =====
- Jeff Taylor, farmer

===== Eliminated in primary =====
- Mike LeBarre

==== Campaign ====
Farr was endorsed by the California Democratic Party in February 2012.

==== Endorsements ====
Sam Farr (D)

Labor unions

- AFL-CIO

==== Results ====
Nonpartisan blanket primary results
Party	Candidate	Votes	%
Democratic	Sam Farr (incumbent)	68,895	64.4
Republican	Jeff Taylor	23,905	22.3
Republican	Mike LeBarre	5,487	5.1
Democratic	Art Dunn	4,095	3.8
Green	Eric Petersen	2,211	2.1
No party preference	Robert Paul Kabat	1,733	1.6
No party preference	Dan Caudle	703	0.7
Total votes		107,029	100.0

=== General election ===
==== Endorsements ====
Sam Farr (D)

Labor unions

- AFL-CIO
- International Brotherhood of Boilermakers
- National Association of Letter Carriers

Organizations

- Human Rights Campaign
- National Organization for Women
- Sierra Club

==== Predictions ====
Source	Ranking	As of
The Cook Political Report	Safe D	November 5, 2012
Rothenberg	Safe D	November 2, 2012
Roll Call	Safe D	November 4, 2012
Sabato's Crystal Ball	Safe D	November 5, 2012
NY Times	Safe D	November 4, 2012
RCP	Safe D	November 4, 2012
The Hill	Safe D	November 4, 2012

==== Results ====
California's 20th congressional district election, 2012
Party	Candidate	Votes	%
Democratic	Sam Farr (incumbent)	172,996	74.1
Republican	Jeff Taylor	60,566	25.9
Total votes		233,562	100.0
Democratic hold			

== District 21 ==
2012 California's 21st congressional district election
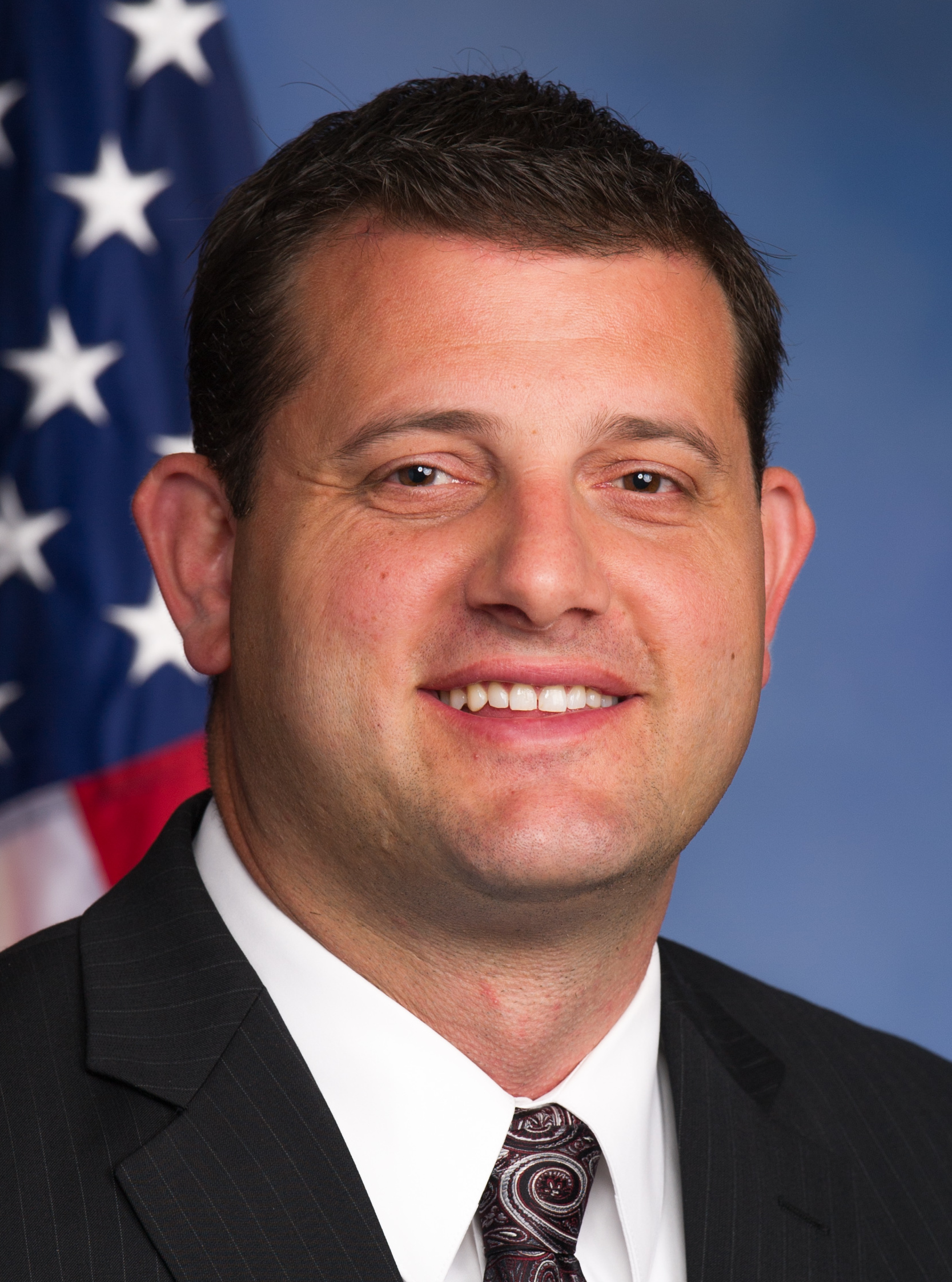

Candidate	David Valadao	John Hernandez
Party	Republican	Democratic
Popular vote	67,164	49,119
Percentage	57.8%	42.2%
- County results Valadao: 50–60% 60–70% Hernandez: 50–60%
U.S. Representative before election
None
(New district)
Elected U.S. Representative
David Valadao
Republican

The 21st district is based in the Central Valley and includes Hanford and parts of Bakersfield. This new district had no incumbent.

=== Primary election ===
==== Republican candidates ====
===== Advanced to general =====
- David Valadao, state assembly member

===== Declined =====
- Andy Vidak, farmer and nominee for the 20th district in 2010

==== Democratic candidates ====
===== Advanced to general =====
- John Hernandez, chief executive officer of the Central California Hispanic Chamber of Commerce

===== Eliminated in primary =====
- Blong Xiong, Fresno City Council member

===== Declined =====
- Cruz Bustamante, former lieutenant governor and nominee for governor in 2003
- Dennis Cardoza, incumbent U.S. representative for the 18th district
- Jim Costa, incumbent U.S. representative for the 20th district
- Michael Rubio, state senator

==== Campaign ====
Valadao was endorsed by the California Republican Party in March 2012.

==== Endorsements ====
Blong Xiong (D)

Labor unions

- AFL-CIO

==== Results ====
Nonpartisan blanket primary results
Party	Candidate	Votes	%
Republican	David Valadao	27,251	57.0
Democratic	John Hernandez	10,575	22.1
Democratic	Blong Xiong	9,990	20.9
Total votes		47,816	100.0

=== General election ===
==== Endorsements ====
David Valadao (R)

Organizations

- National Republican Congressional Committee "Young Guns" Program
- National Right to Life Committee
- NRA Political Victory Fund
- United States Chamber of Commerce
John Hernandez (D)

Labor unions

- AFL-CIO
- National Association of Letter Carriers

==== Polling ====
Poll source	Date(s) administered	Sample size	Margin of error	David Valadao (R)	John Hernandez (D)	Undecided
Fairbank, Maslin, Maullin, Metz & Associates (D-Hernandez)	October 13–16, 2012	509 (LV)	± 4.4%	41%	37%	22%
Moore (R-Valadao)	October 8–9, 2012	400 (LV)	± 5.0%	53%	33%	14%

==== Predictions ====
Source	Ranking	As of
The Cook Political Report	Likely R	November 5, 2012
Rothenberg	Safe R	November 2, 2012
Roll Call	Safe R	November 4, 2012
Sabato's Crystal Ball	Likely R	November 5, 2012
NY Times	Lean R	November 4, 2012
RCP	Likely R	November 4, 2012
The Hill	Lean R	November 4, 2012

==== Results ====
California's 21st congressional district election, 2012
Party	Candidate	Votes	%
Republican	David Valadao	67,164	57.8
Democratic	John Hernandez	49,119	42.2
Majority		18,045	15.6
Total votes		116,283	100.0
Republican win (new seat)			

== District 22 ==
2012 California's 22nd congressional district election
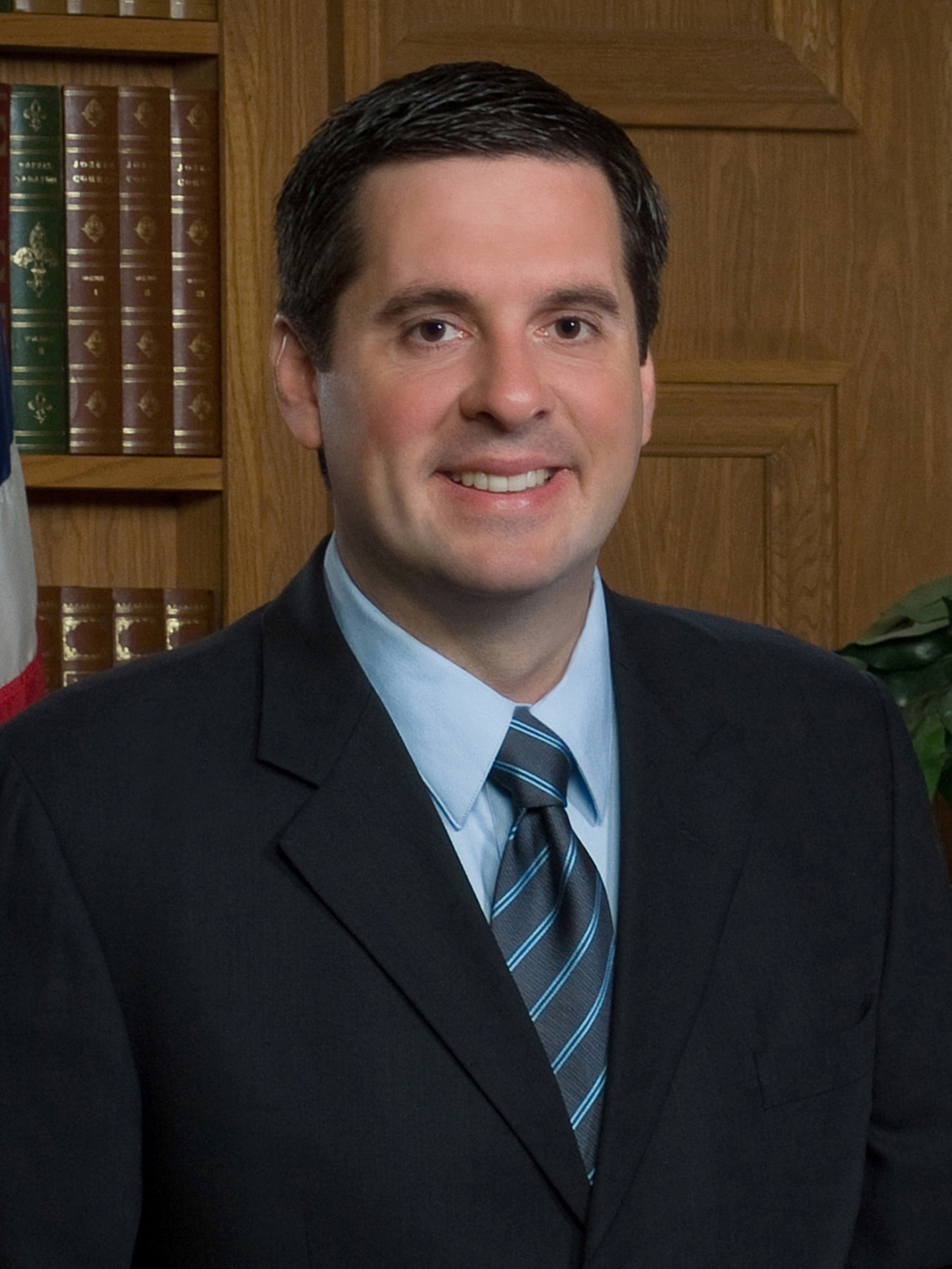

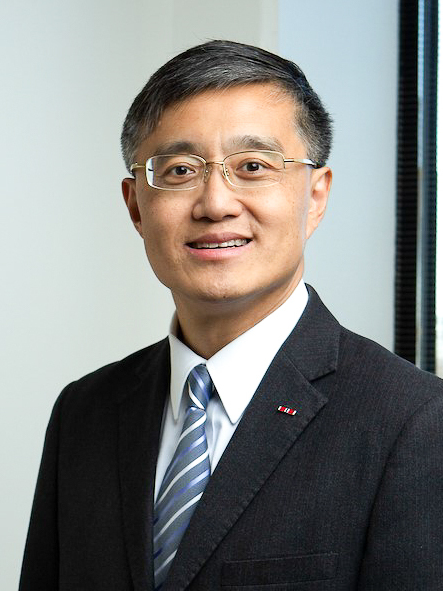
Candidate	Devin Nunes	Otto Lee
Party	Republican	Democratic
Popular vote	132,386	81,555
Percentage	61.9%	38.1%
- County results Nunes: 60–70%
U.S. Representative before election
Devin Nunes
Republican
Elected U.S. Representative
Devin Nunes
Republican

The 22nd district is based in the Central Valley and includes Clovis, Tulare, and Visalia. Republican Devin Nunes, who represented the 21st district from 2003 to 2013, ran for re-election here.

=== Primary election ===
==== Republican candidates ====
===== Advanced to general =====
- Devin Nunes, incumbent U.S. representative

==== Democratic candidates ====
===== Advanced to general =====
- Otto Lee, lawyer and former member of the Sunnyvale City Council

==== Campaign ====
Nunes received the endorsement of the California Democratic Party in March 2012.

==== Endorsements ====
Otto Lee (D)

Labor unions

- AFL-CIO

==== Results ====
Nonpartisan blanket primary results
Party	Candidate	Votes	%
Republican	Devin Nunes (incumbent)	67,386	70.6
Democratic	Otto Lee	28,091	29.4
Total votes		95,477	100.0

=== General election ===
==== Endorsements ====
Devin Nunes (R)

Organizations

- Campaign for Working Families
- National Right to Life Committee
- NRA Political Victory Fund
- United States Chamber of Commerce
Otto Lee (D)

Labor unions

- AFL-CIO
- International Brotherhood of Boilermakers

==== Predictions ====
Source	Ranking	As of
The Cook Political Report	Safe R	November 5, 2012
Rothenberg	Safe R	November 2, 2012
Roll Call	Safe R	November 4, 2012
Sabato's Crystal Ball	Safe R	November 5, 2012
NY Times	Safe R	November 4, 2012
RCP	Safe R	November 4, 2012
The Hill	Safe R	November 4, 2012

==== Results ====
California's 22nd congressional district election, 2012
Party	Candidate	Votes	%
Republican	Devin Nunes (incumbent)	132,386	61.9
Democratic	Otto Lee	81,555	38.1
Total votes		213,941	100.0
Republican hold			

== District 23 ==
2012 California's 23rd congressional district election
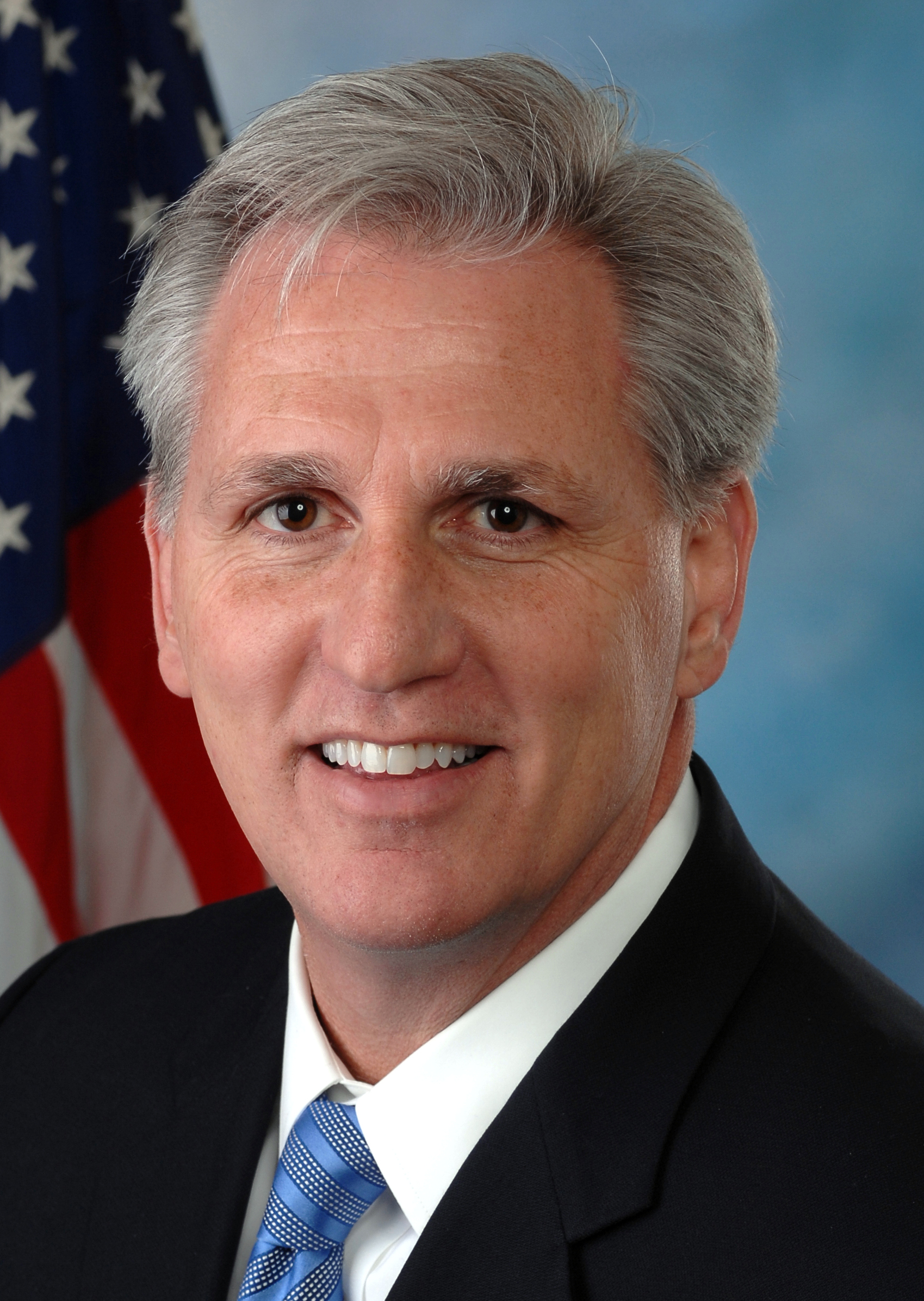

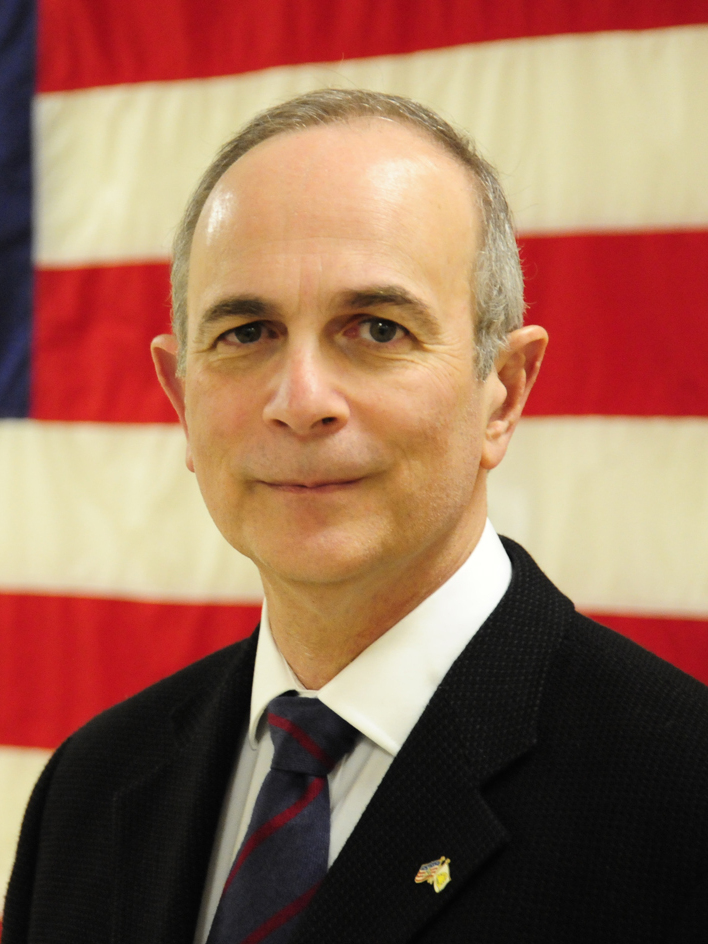
Candidate	Kevin McCarthy	Terry Phillips
Party	Republican	Independent
Popular vote	158,161	57,842
Percentage	73.2%	26.8%
- County results McCarthy: 60–70% 70–80%
U.S. Representative before election
Kevin McCarthy
Republican
Elected U.S. Representative
Kevin McCarthy
Republican

The 23rd district is based in the southern Central Valley and includes parts of Bakersfield. House Majority Whip and Republican Kevin McCarthy, who represented the 22nd district from 2007 to 2013, ran for re-election here.

=== Primary election ===
==== Republican candidates ====
===== Advanced to general =====
- Kevin McCarthy, incumbent U.S. representative

==== Democratic candidates ====
No Democrats filed.

==== Independent candidates ====
===== Advanced to general =====
- Terry Phillips, former news reporter for Valley Public Radio, CBS, and NBC/Mutual

==== Campaign ====
McCarthy was endorsed by the California Republican Party in March 2012.

==== Endorsements ====
Terry Phillips (NPP)

Labor unions

- AFL-CIO

==== Results ====
Nonpartisan blanket primary results
Party	Candidate	Votes	%
Republican	Kevin McCarthy (incumbent)	71,109	72.2
No party preference	Terry Phillips	17,018	17.3
Republican	Eric Parker	10,414	10.6
Total votes		98,541	100.0

=== General election ===
==== Endorsements ====
Kevin McCarthy (R)

Organizations

- Campaign for Working Families
- National Right to Life Committee
- NRA Political Victory Fund
- United States Chamber of Commerce
Terry Phillips (NPP)

Labor unions

- AFL-CIO
- International Brotherhood of Boilermakers

==== Predictions ====
Source	Ranking	As of
The Cook Political Report	Safe R	November 5, 2012
Rothenberg	Safe R	November 2, 2012
Roll Call	Safe R	November 4, 2012
Sabato's Crystal Ball	Safe R	November 5, 2012
NY Times	Safe R	November 4, 2012
RCP	Safe R	November 4, 2012
The Hill	Safe R	November 4, 2012

==== Results ====
California's 23rd congressional district election, 2012
Party	Candidate	Votes	%
Republican	Kevin McCarthy (incumbent)	158,161	73.2
No party preference	Terry Phillips	57,842	26.8
Total votes		216,003	100.0
Republican hold			

== District 24 ==
2012 California's 24th congressional district election
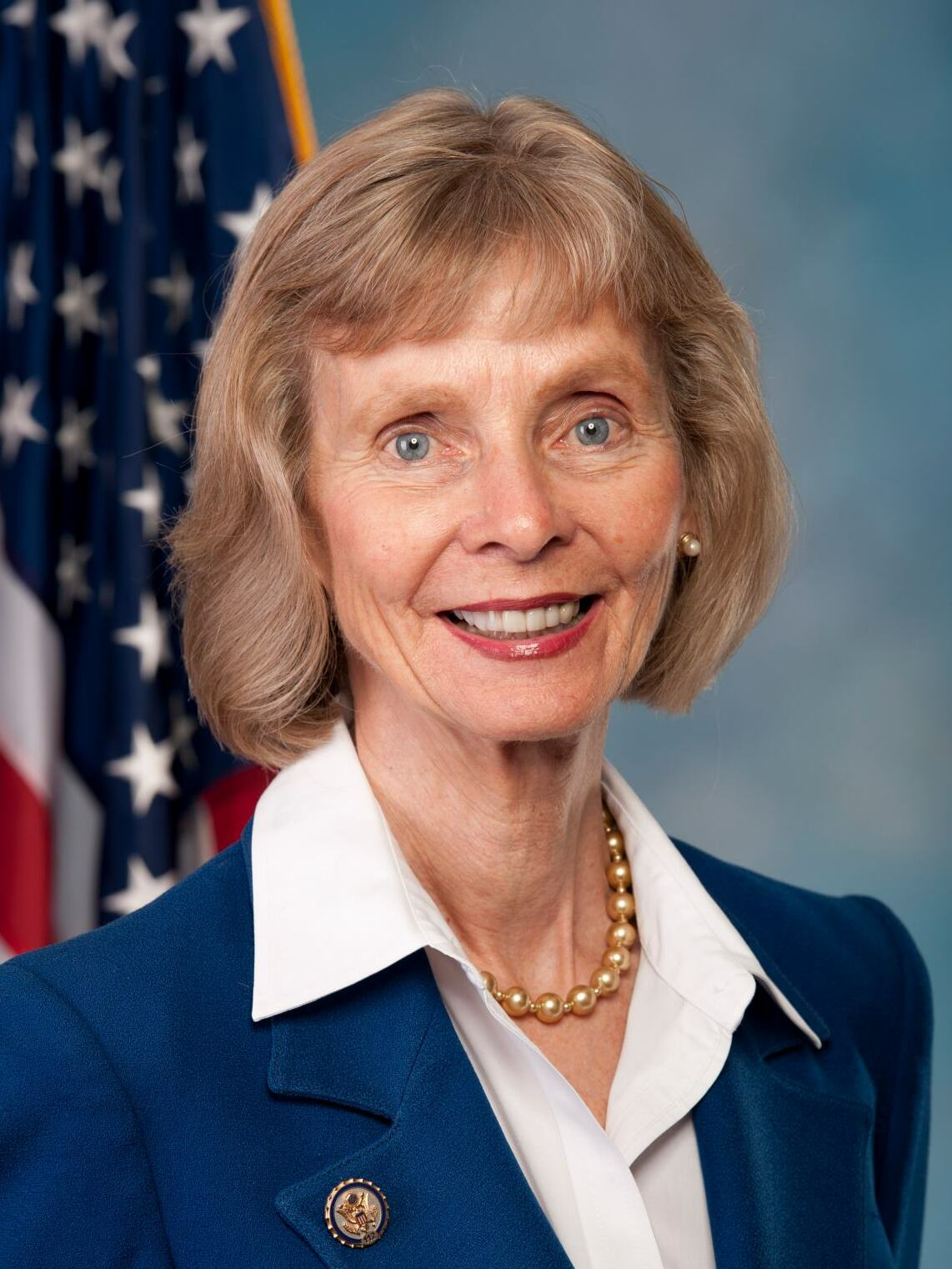

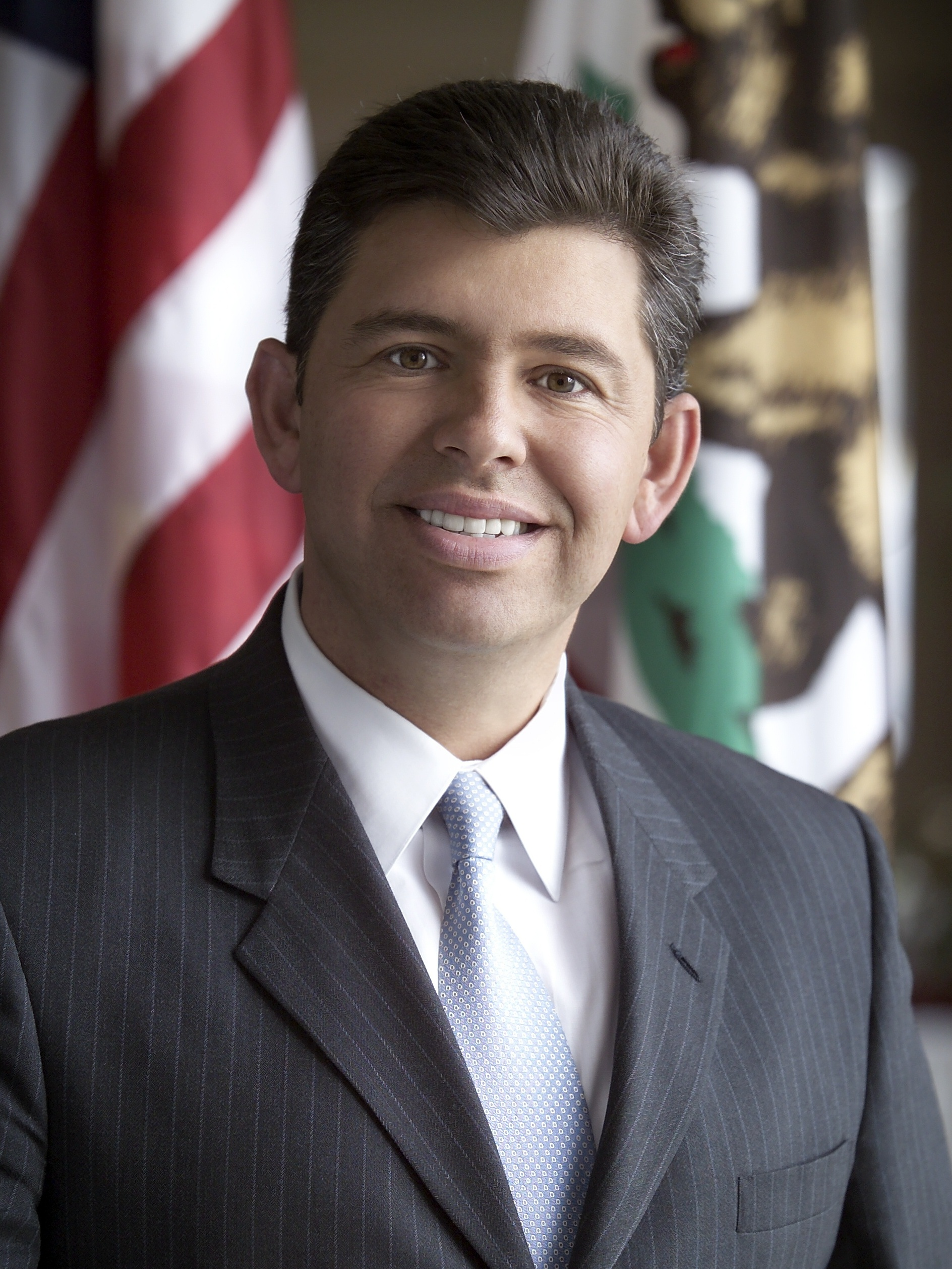
Candidate	Lois Capps	Abel Maldonado
Party	Democratic	Republican
Popular vote	156,749	127,746
Percentage	55.1%	44.9%
- County results Capps: 50–60% 60–70%
U.S. Representative before election
Lois Capps
Democratic
Elected U.S. Representative
Lois Capps
Democratic

The 24th district is based in the Central Coast and includes San Luis Obispo and Santa Barbara. Democrat Lois Capps, who represented California's 23rd congressional district from 2003 to 2013 and the 22nd district from 1998 to 2003, ran for re-election here.

=== Primary election ===
==== Democratic candidates ====
===== Advanced to general =====
- Lois Capps, incumbent U.S. representative

==== Republican candidates ====
===== Advanced to general =====
- Abel Maldonado, former lieutenant governor

===== Eliminated in primary =====
- Christopher Mitchum, former actor and businessman

===== Withdrawn =====
- Tom Watson

==== Campaign ====
Capps received the endorsement of the California Democratic Party in February 2012. In March 2012, the California Republican Party declined to endorse any candidate, while the Santa Barbara County party endorsed Mitchum.

==== Endorsements ====
Lois Capps (D)

Labor unions

- AFL-CIO

Organizations

- Sierra Club

==== Results ====
Nonpartisan blanket primary results
Party	Candidate	Votes	%
Democratic	Lois Capps (incumbent)	72,356	46.4
Republican	Abel Maldonado	46,295	29.7
Republican	Christopher Mitchum	33,604	21.5
No party preference	Matt Boutté	3,832	2.5
Total votes		156,087	100.0

=== General election ===
==== Endorsements ====
Lois Capps (D)

Labor unions

- AFL-CIO
- International Brotherhood of Boilermakers
- National Association of Letter Carriers

Organizations

- Democratic Congressional Campaign Committee "Frontline" Program
- EMILY's List
- Human Rights Campaign
- National Organization for Women
- Sierra Club
Abel Maldonado (R)

Organizations

- National Republican Congressional Committee "Young Guns" Program
- United States Chamber of Commerce

==== Polling ====
Poll source	Date(s) administered	Sample size	Margin of error	Lois Capps (D)	Abel Maldonado (R)	Undecided
Public Opinion Strategies (R-Maldonado)	October 1–3, 2012	400 (LV)	± 4.9%	44%	45%	11%
DCCC (D)	July 23, 2012	379 (LV)	± 5.0%	51%	40%	9%
Public Opinion Strategies (R-Maldonado)	June 26–28, 2012	300 (LV)	± 5.7%	48%	46%	6%

==== Predictions ====
Source	Ranking	As of
The Cook Political Report	Lean D	November 5, 2012
Rothenberg	Tilt D	November 2, 2012
Roll Call	Tossup	November 4, 2012
Sabato's Crystal Ball	Lean D	November 5, 2012
NY Times	Lean D	November 4, 2012
RCP	Tossup	November 4, 2012
The Hill	Tossup	November 4, 2012

==== Results ====
California's 24th congressional district election, 2012
Party	Candidate	Votes	%
Democratic	Lois Capps (incumbent)	156,749	55.1
Republican	Abel Maldonado	127,746	44.9
Majority		29,003	10.2
Total votes		284,495	100.0
Democratic hold			

== District 25 ==
2012 California's 25th congressional district election
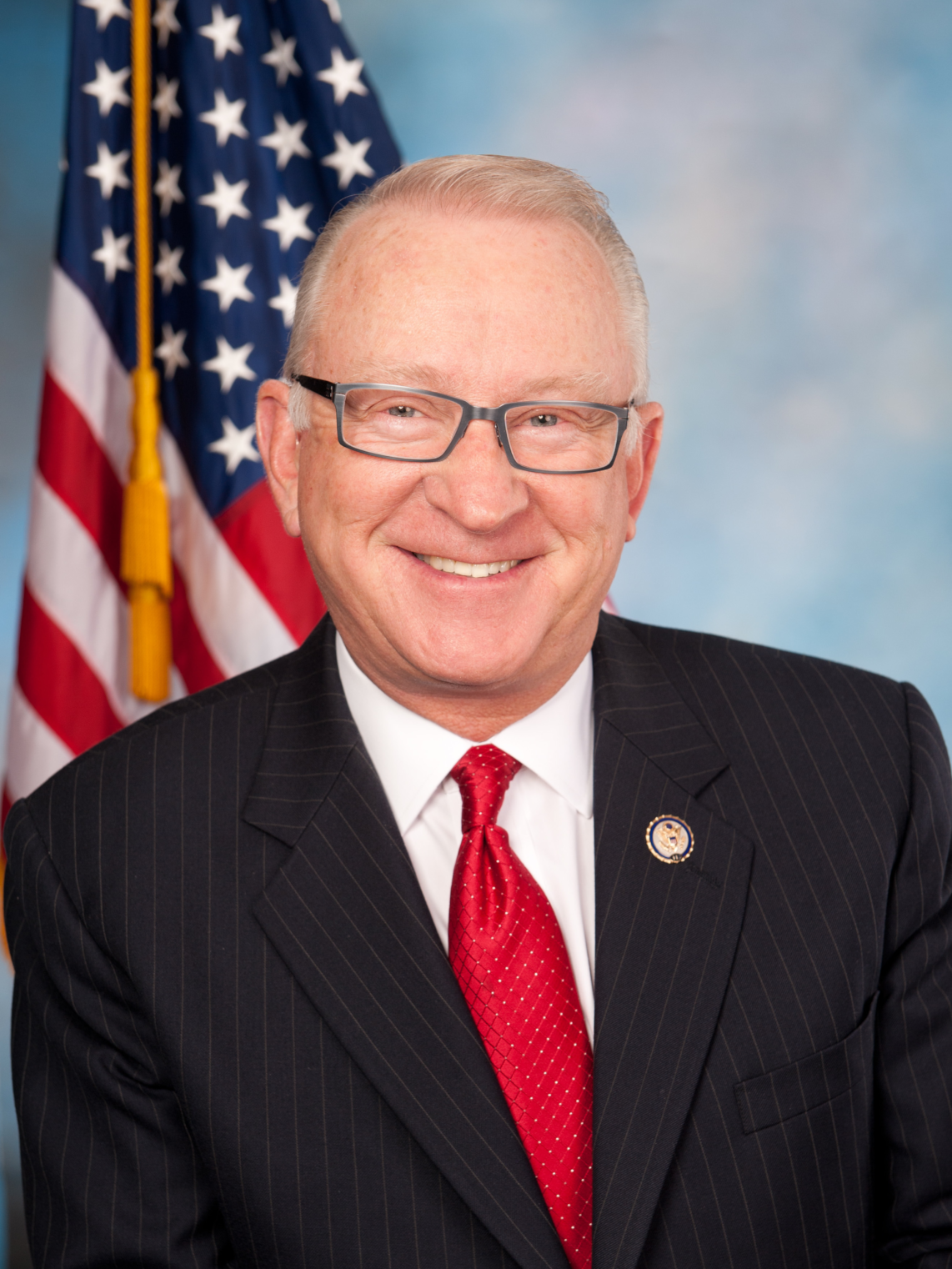

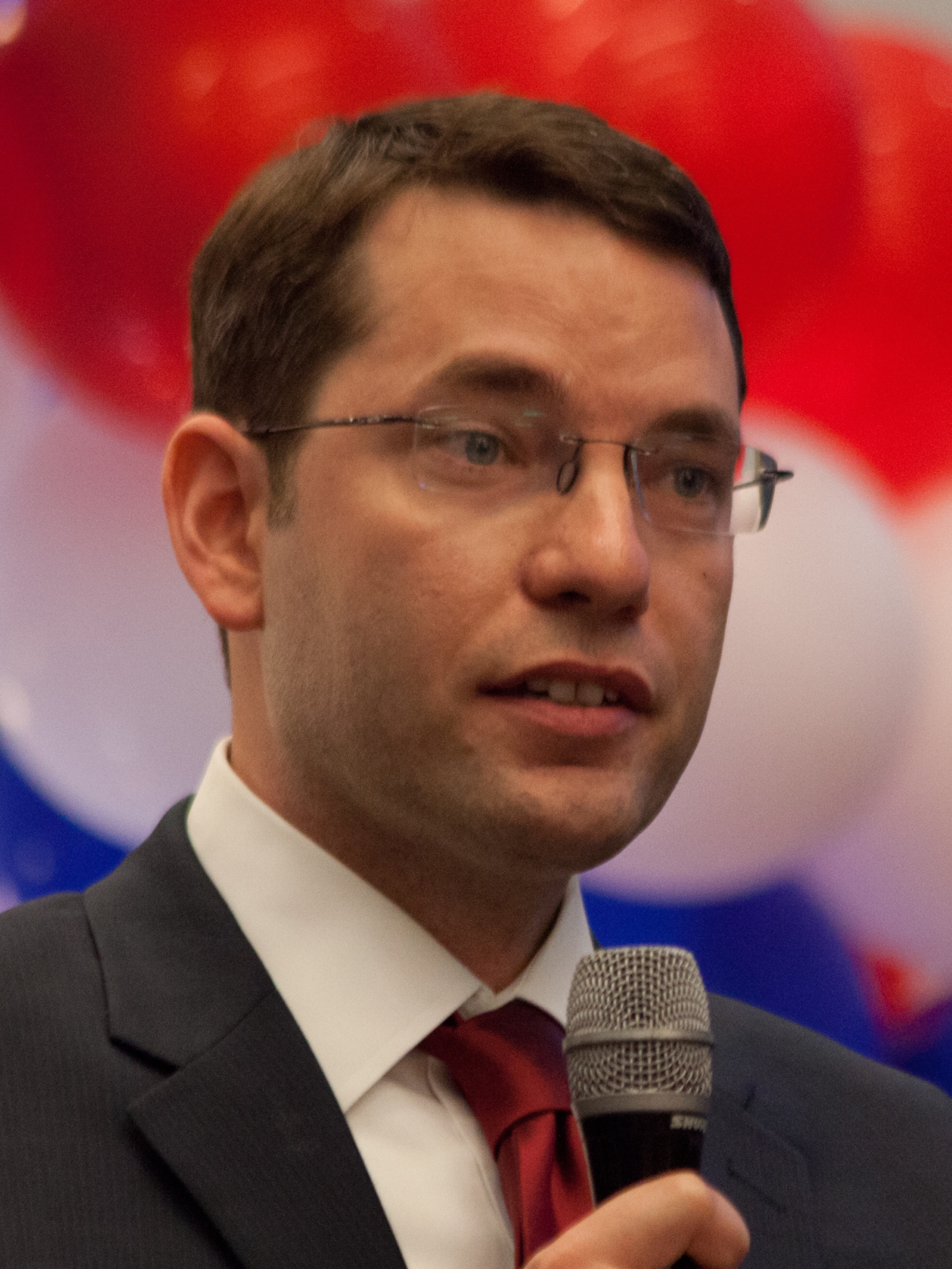
Candidate	Buck McKeon	Lee Rogers
Party	Republican	Democratic
Popular vote	129,593	106,982
Percentage	54.8%	45.2%
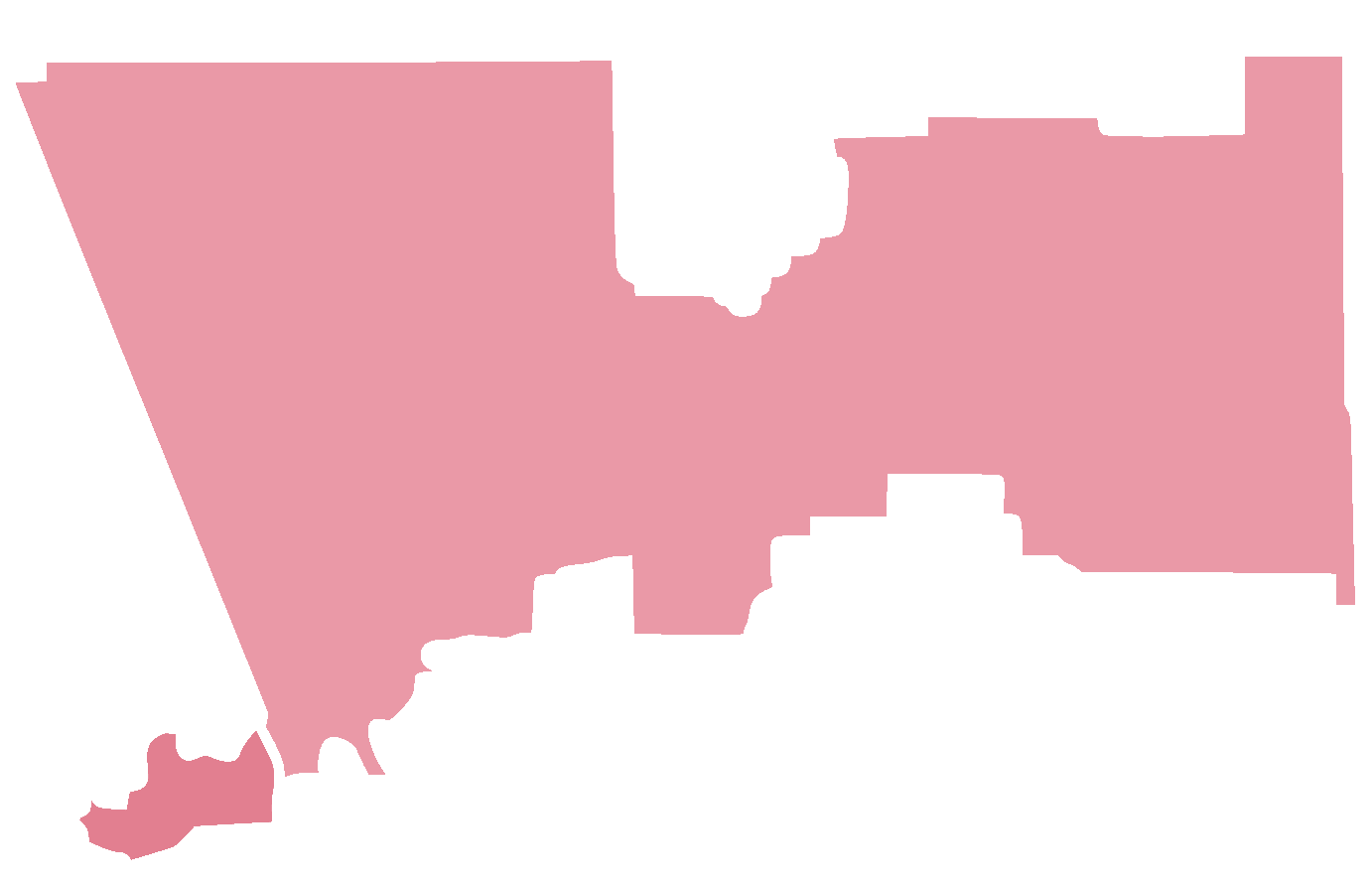
- Results by county McKeon: 50%–55% 55%–60%
U.S. Representative before election
Buck McKeon
Republican
Elected U.S. Representative
Buck McKeon
Republican

The 25th district is based in northern Los Angeles County and includes Palmdale and Santa Clarita. Republican Howard McKeon, who had represented the 25th district since 1993, ran for re-election.

=== Primary election ===
==== Republican candidates ====
===== Advanced to general =====
- Howard McKeon, incumbent U.S. representative

===== Eliminated in primary =====
- Dante Acosta, financial advisor
- Cathie Wright, daughter of former state senator Catherine Wright

===== Declined =====
- Elton Gallegly, incumbent U.S. representative for the 24th district

==== Democratic candidates ====
===== Advanced to general =====
- Lee Rogers, podiatrist

==== Withdrawn ====
- Laura Molina, artist.

==== Campaign ====
Rogers was endorsed by the California Democratic Party in February 2012. McKeon received the endorsement of the California Republican Party in March 2012.

==== Endorsements ====
Lee Rogers (D)

Labor unions

- AFL-CIO

==== Results ====
Nonpartisan blanket primary results
Party	Candidate	Votes	%
Republican	Howard McKeon (incumbent)	39,997	50.5
Democratic	Lee Rogers	23,542	29.7
Republican	Dante Acosta	10,387	13.1
Republican	Cathie Wright	5,215	6.6
Total votes		79,141	100.0

=== General election ===
==== Endorsements ====
Howard McKeon (R)

Organizations

- National Right to Life Committee
- NRA Political Victory Fund
- United States Chamber of Commerce
Lee Rogers (D)

Labor unions

- AFL-CIO
- International Brotherhood of Boilermakers

Organizations

- Sierra Club

==== Predictions ====
Source	Ranking	As of
The Cook Political Report	Safe R	November 5, 2012
Rothenberg	Safe R	November 2, 2012
Roll Call	Safe R	November 4, 2012
Sabato's Crystal Ball	Safe R	November 5, 2012
NY Times	Safe R	November 4, 2012
RCP	Safe R	November 4, 2012
The Hill	Safe R	November 4, 2012

==== Results ====
California's 25th congressional district election, 2012
Party	Candidate	Votes	%
Republican	Howard McKeon (incumbent)	129,593	54.8
Democratic	Lee Rogers	106,982	45.2
Majority		22,611	9.6
Total votes		236,575	100.0
Republican hold			

== District 26 ==
2012 California's 26th congressional district election
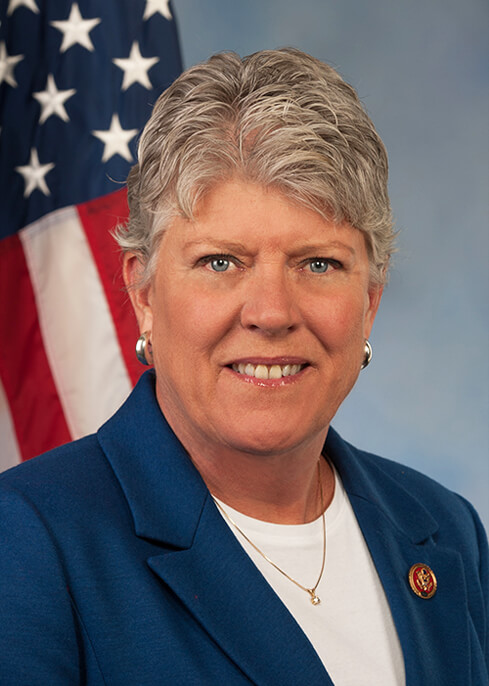

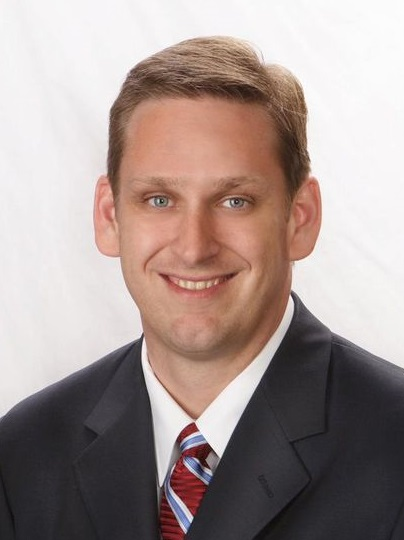
Candidate	Julia Brownley	Tony Strickland
Party	Democratic	Republican
Popular vote	139,072	124,863
Percentage	52.7%	47.3%
- County results Brownley: 50–60% Strickland: 50–60%
U.S. Representative before election
Elton Gallegly
Republican
Elected U.S. Representative
Julia Brownley
Democratic

The 26th district is based in the southern Central Coast and includes Oxnard and Thousand Oaks. Republican Elton Gallegly, who represented the 24th district from 2003 to 2013 and its predecessors since 1987, retired.

=== Primary election ===
==== Republican candidates ====
===== Advanced to general =====
- Tony Strickland, state senator

===== Declined =====
- Glen Becerra, member of the Simi Valley City Council
- David Dreier, incumbent U.S. representative for the 26th district
- Elton Gallegly, incumbent U.S. representative for the 24th district
- Keith Millhouse, member of the Moorpark City Council
- Greg Totten, Ventura County district attorney

==== Democratic candidates ====
===== Advanced to general =====
- Julia Brownley, state assembly member

===== Eliminated in primary =====
- Albert Maxwell Goldberg, real estate agent and broker
- Jess Herrera, commissioner of the Oxnard Harbor District
- David Cruz Thayne, businessman and former professional tennis player

===== Withdrawn =====
- Steve Bennett, member of the Ventura County Board of Supervisors
- David Pollock, member of the Moorpark City Council
- Esequiel Ruelas, retired longshoreman; ended his campaign and endorsed Brownley

===== Declined =====
- Richard Francis, former mayor of Ventura
- Fran Pavley, state senator
- Mary Anne Rooney, commissioner of the Oxnard Harbor District
- Brad Sherman, incumbent U.S. representative for the 27th district

==== Independent candidates ====
===== Eliminated in primary =====
- Linda Parks, member of the Ventura County Board of Supervisors (and previously a registered Republican)

===== Withdrawn =====
- Akiva Werbalowsky, permaculture designer

==== Campaign ====
At the California Democratic Party convention, held in February 2012, delegates voted to make no endorsement. In March 2012, Strickland was endorsed by the California Republican Party.

==== Endorsements ====
Julia Brownley (D)

Labor unions

- AFL-CIO

==== Results ====
Nonpartisan blanket primary results
Party	Candidate	Votes	%
Republican	Tony Strickland	49,043	44.1
Democratic	Julia Brownley	29,892	26.9
No party preference	Linda Parks	20,301	18.3
Democratic	Jess Herrera	7,244	6.5
Democratic	David Cruz Thayne	2,809	2.5
Democratic	Alex Maxwell Goldberg	1,880	1.7
Total votes		111,169	100.0

=== General election ===
==== Endorsements ====
Tony Strickland (R)

Organizations

- American Conservative Union
- National Republican Congressional Committee "Young Guns" Program
- National Right to Life Committee
- NRA Political Victory Fund
- United States Chamber of Commerce
Julia Brownley (D)

Labor unions

- AFL-CIO
- International Brotherhood of Boilermakers
- National Association of Letter Carriers

Organizations

- Democratic Congressional Campaign Committee "Red to Blue" Program
- EMILY's List
- Human Rights Campaign
- National Organization for Women
- Sierra Club

==== Debate ====
2012 California's 26th congressional district debate
No.	Date	Host	Moderator	Link	Republican	Democratic
Key: P Participant A Absent N Not invited I Invited W Withdrawn						
Key: P Participant A Absent N Not invited I Invited W Withdrawn					Tony Strickland	Julia Brownley
1	Oct. 2, 2012	California Lutheran University; Ventura County Star	Henry Dubroff; Timm Herdt		P	P

==== Polling ====
Poll source	Date(s) administered	Sample size	Margin of error	Tony Strickland (R)	Julia Brownley (D)	Undecided
Tulchin Research (D-Brownley)	July 15–19, 2012	700 (LV)	± 3.7%	44%	48%	8%

==== Predictions ====
Source	Ranking	As of
The Cook Political Report	Tossup	November 5, 2012
Rothenberg	Tossup	November 2, 2012
Roll Call	Tossup	November 4, 2012
Sabato's Crystal Ball	Lean D (flip)	November 5, 2012
NY Times	Lean D (flip)	November 4, 2012
RCP	Tossup	November 4, 2012
The Hill	Tossup	November 4, 2012

==== Results ====
California's 26th congressional district election, 2012
Party	Candidate	Votes	%
Democratic	Julia Brownley	139,072	52.7
Republican	Tony Strickland	124,863	47.3
Majority		14,209	5.4
Total votes		263,935	100.0
Democratic gain from Republican			

== District 27 ==
2012 California's 27th congressional district election
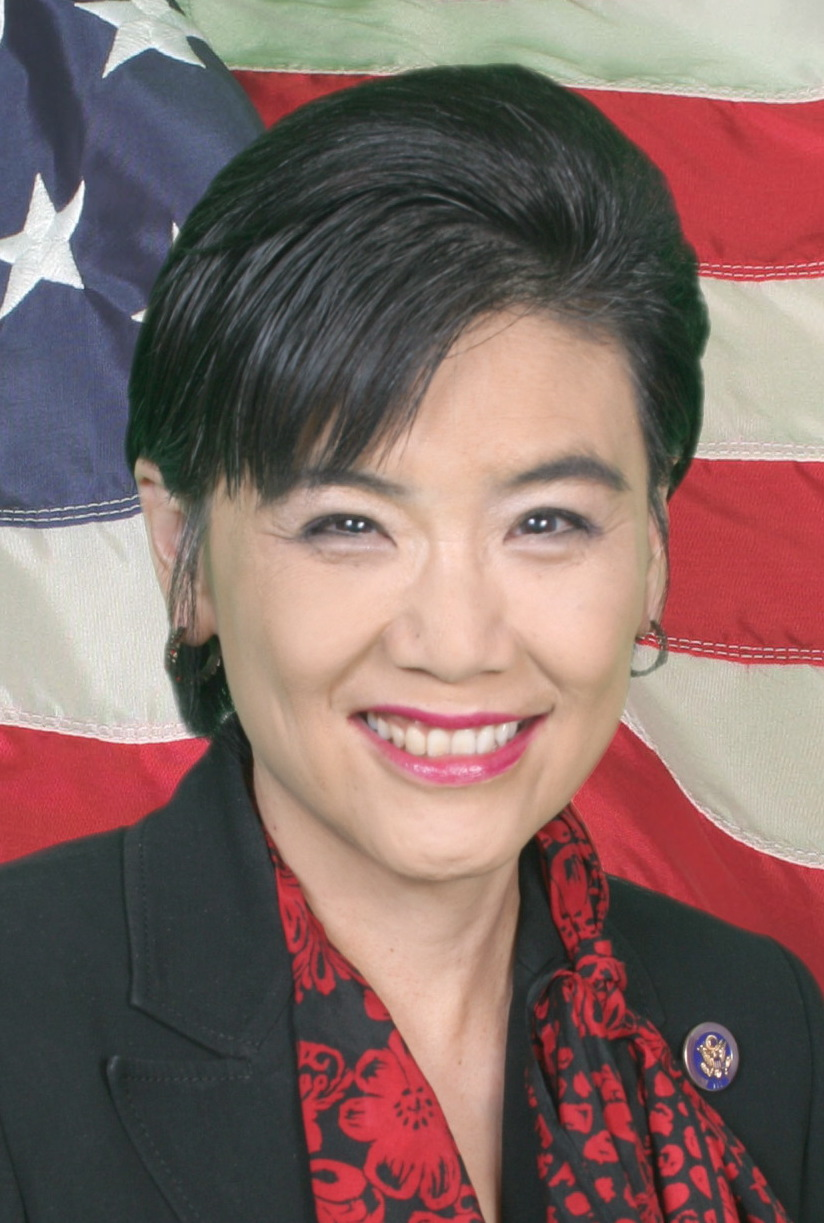

Candidate	Judy Chu	Jack Orswell
Party	Democratic	Republican
Popular vote	154,191	86,817
Percentage	64.0%	36.0%
- County results Chu: 60–70% Orswell: 60–70%
U.S. Representative before election
Judy Chu
Democratic
Elected U.S. Representative
Judy Chu
Democratic

The 27th district is based in the San Gabriel Foothills and includes Alhambra and Pasadena. Democrat Judy Chu, who represented the 32nd district from 2009 to 2013, ran for re-election here.

=== Primary election ===
==== Democratic candidates ====
===== Advanced to general =====
- Judy Chu, incumbent U.S. representative

==== Republican candidates ====
===== Advanced to general =====
- Jack Orswell, small business owner

===== Eliminated in primary =====
- Bob Duran, tax attorney and businessman

==== Campaign ====
Chu received the endorsement of the California Democratic Party in February 2012. Orswell received the endorsement of the California Republican Party in March 2012.

==== Endorsements ====
Judy Chu (D)

Labor unions

- AFL-CIO

==== Results ====
Nonpartisan blanket primary results
Party	Candidate	Votes	%
Democratic	Judy Chu (incumbent)	50,203	57.8
Republican	Jack Orswell	20,868	24.0
Republican	Bob Duran	15,819	18.2
Total votes		86,890	100.0

=== General election ===
==== Endorsements ====
Judy Chu (D)

Labor unions

- AFL-CIO
- International Brotherhood of Boilermakers
- National Association of Letter Carriers

Organizations

- Human Rights Campaign
- National Organization for Women
- Sierra Club

==== Predictions ====
Source	Ranking	As of
The Cook Political Report	Safe D	November 5, 2012
Rothenberg	Safe D	November 2, 2012
Roll Call	Safe D	November 4, 2012
Sabato's Crystal Ball	Safe D	November 5, 2012
NY Times	Safe D	November 4, 2012
RCP	Safe D	November 4, 2012
The Hill	Safe D	November 4, 2012

==== Results ====
California's 27th congressional district election, 2012
Party	Candidate	Votes	%
Democratic	Judy Chu (incumbent)	154,191	64.0
Republican	Jack Orswell	86,817	36.0
Total votes		241,008	100.0
Democratic hold			

== District 28 ==
2012 California's 28th congressional district election
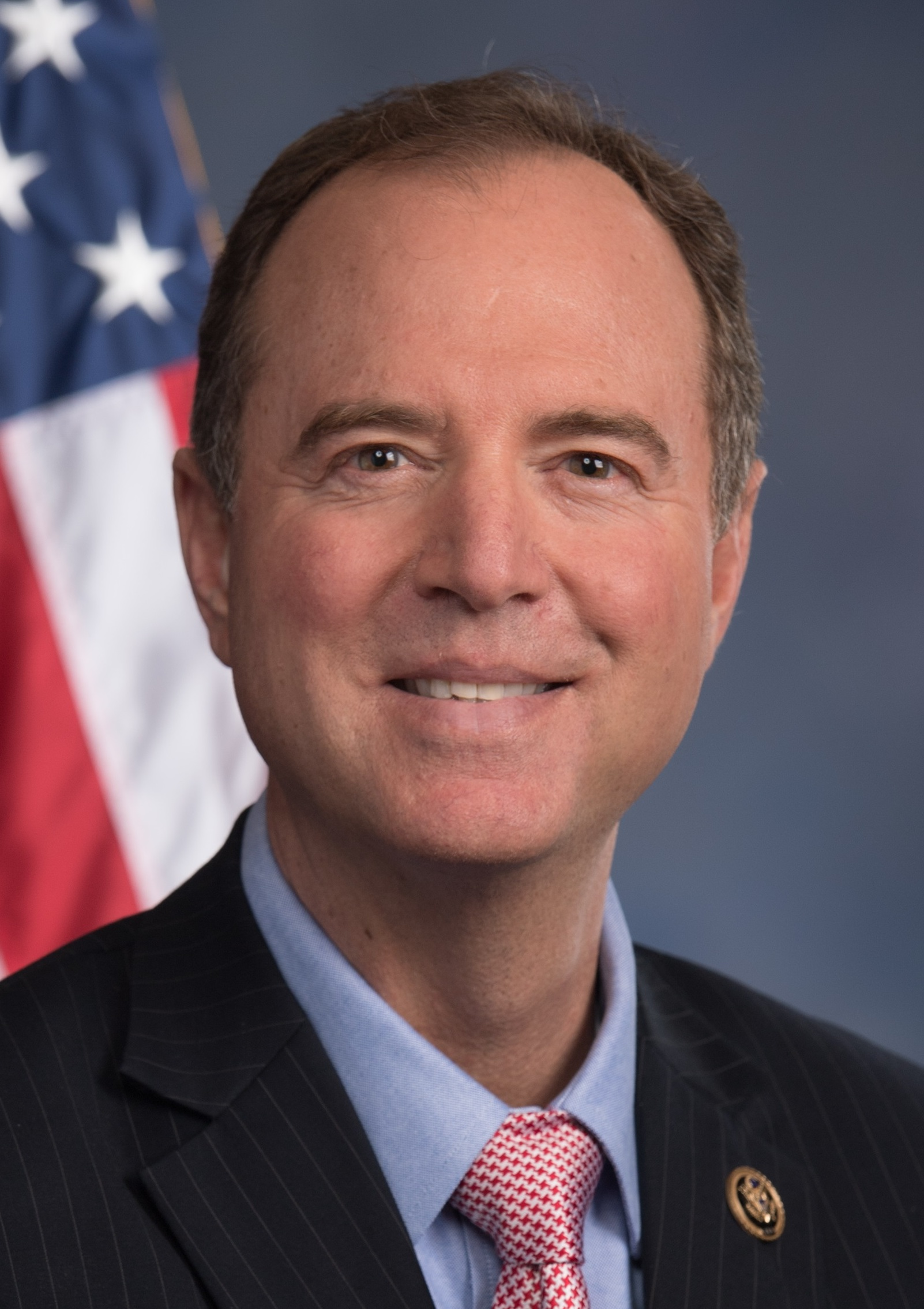

Candidate	Adam Schiff	Phil Jennerjahn
Party	Democratic	Republican
Popular vote	188,703	58,008
Percentage	76.5%	23.5%
- County results Schiff: 70–80%
U.S. Representative before election
Adam Schiff
Democratic
Elected U.S. Representative
Adam Schiff
Democratic

The 28th district is based in the northern Los Angeles suburbs and includes Burbank and Glendale as well as parts of central Los Angeles. Democrat Adam Schiff, who represented the 29th district from 2003 to 2013 and the 27th district from 2001 to 2003, ran for re-election here.

=== Primary election ===
==== Democratic candidates ====
===== Advanced to general =====
- Adam Schiff, incumbent U.S. representative

===== Eliminated in primary =====
- Sal Genovese, community services administrator
- Jonathan Ryan Kalbfeld, entrepreneur and software engineer
- Massie Munroe, civil engineer

==== Republican candidates ====
===== Advanced to general =====
- Phil Jennerjahn, political consultant, candidate for mayor of Los Angeles in 2009 and for the 33rd District in 2010

===== Eliminated in primary =====
- Garen Mailyan, security officer
- Jenny Worman, actress and Hollywood stand-in

==== Campaign ====
Schiff was endorsed by the California Democratic Party in February 2012.

==== Endorsements ====
Adam Schiff (D)

Labor unions

- AFL-CIO

Organizations

- Blue Dog Coalition
Jenny Worman (R)

Organizations

- Republican Liberty Caucus

==== Results ====
Nonpartisan blanket primary results
Party	Candidate	Votes	%
Democratic	Adam Schiff (incumbent)	42,797	59.0
Republican	Phil Jennerjahn	12,633	17.4
Republican	Jenny Worman	5,978	8.2
Republican	Garen Mailyan	3,749	5.2
Democratic	Sal Genovese	2,829	3.9
Democratic	Massie Munroe	2,437	3.4
Democratic	Jonathan Ryan Kalbfeld	2,119	2.9
Total votes		72,542	100.0

=== General election ===
==== Endorsements ====
Adam Schiff (D)

Labor unions

- AFL-CIO
- International Brotherhood of Boilermakers
- National Association of Letter Carriers

Organizations

- Blue Dog Coalition
- Human Rights Campaign
- National Organization for Women
- Sierra Club

==== Predictions ====
Source	Ranking	As of
The Cook Political Report	Safe D	November 5, 2012
Rothenberg	Safe D	November 2, 2012
Roll Call	Safe D	November 4, 2012
Sabato's Crystal Ball	Safe D	November 5, 2012
NY Times	Safe D	November 4, 2012
RCP	Safe D	November 4, 2012
The Hill	Safe D	November 4, 2012

==== Results ====
California's 28th congressional district election, 2012
Party	Candidate	Votes	%
Democratic	Adam Schiff (incumbent)	188,703	76.5
Republican	Phil Jennerjahn	58,008	23.5
Total votes		246,711	100.0
Democratic hold			

== District 29 ==
2012 California's 29th congressional district election
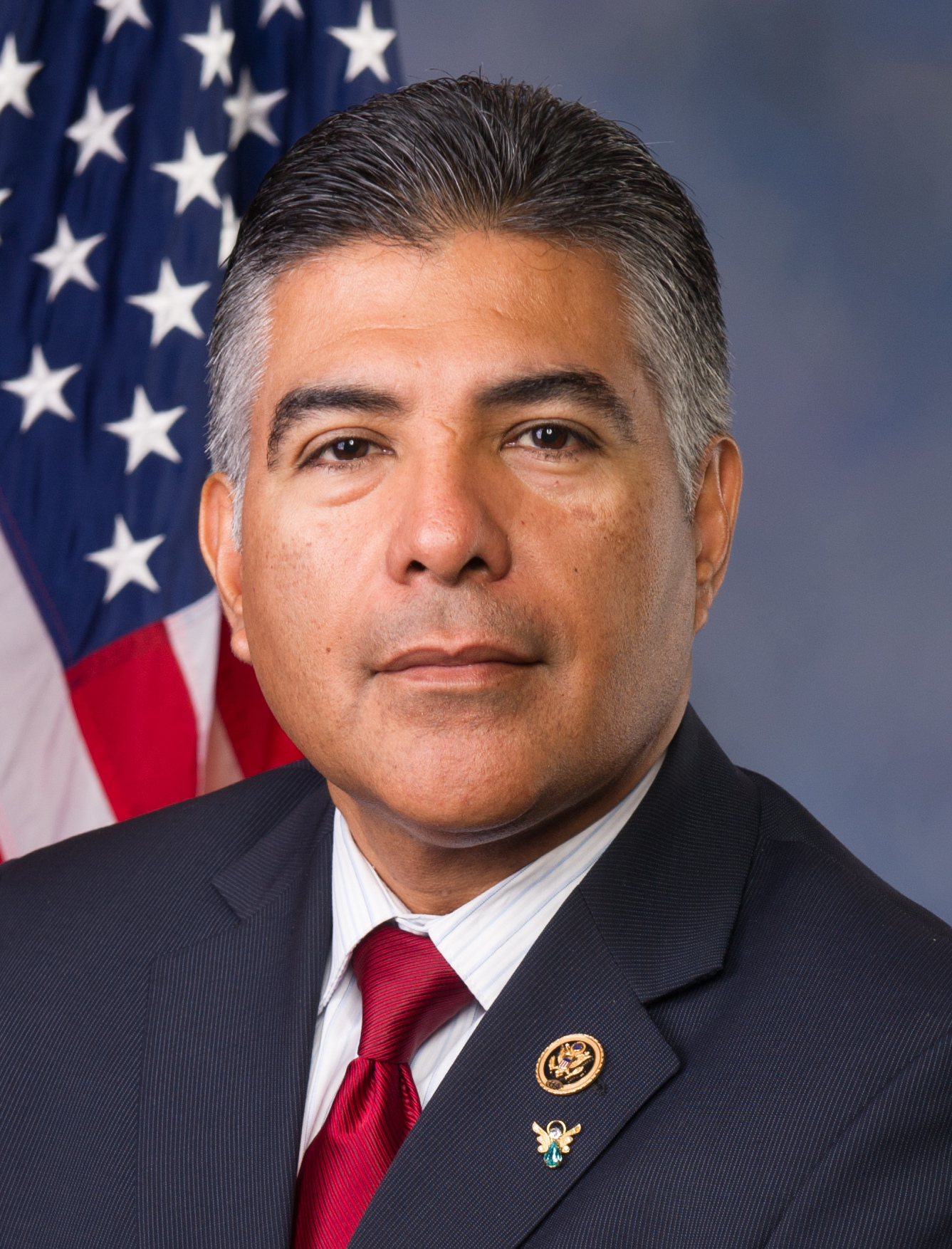

Candidate	Tony Cardenas	David R. Hernandez
Party	Democratic	No party preference
Popular vote	111,287	38,994
Percentage	74.1%	25.9%
- County results Cardenas: 70–80%
U.S. Representative before election
(None)
New district
Elected U.S. Representative
Tony Cardenas
Democratic

The 29th district is based in the northeastern San Fernando Valley. This new district had no incumbent.

=== Primary election ===
==== Democratic candidates ====
===== Advanced to general =====
- Tony Cardenas, member of the Los Angeles City Council

===== Eliminated in primary =====
- Richard Valdez, businessman

===== Declined =====
- Howard Berman, incumbent U.S. representative for the 28th district

==== Republican candidates ====
No Republicans filed.

==== Independent candidates ====
===== Advanced to general =====
- David Hernandez, president of the San Fernando Chamber of Commerce

==== Campaign ====
Cardenas received the endorsement of the California Democratic Party in February 2012.

==== Endorsements ====
Tony Cardenas (D)

Labor unions

- AFL-CIO

==== Results ====
Nonpartisan blanket primary results
Party	Candidate	Votes	%
Democratic	Tony Cardenas	24,882	64.4
No party preference	David R. Hernandez	8,382	21.7
Democratic	Richard Valdez	5,379	13.9
Total votes		38,643	100.0

=== General election ===
==== Endorsements ====
Tony Cardenas (D)

Labor unions

- AFL-CIO
- International Brotherhood of Boilermakers
- National Association of Letter Carriers

Organizations

- Democratic Congressional Campaign Committee "Majority Makers" Program
- Human Rights Campaign

==== Predictions ====
Source	Ranking	As of
The Cook Political Report	Safe D	November 5, 2012
Rothenberg	Safe D	November 2, 2012
Roll Call	Safe D	November 4, 2012
Sabato's Crystal Ball	Safe D	November 5, 2012
NY Times	Safe D	November 4, 2012
RCP	Safe D	November 4, 2012
The Hill	Safe D	November 4, 2012

==== Results ====
California's 29th congressional district election, 2012
Party	Candidate	Votes	%
Democratic	Tony Cardenas	111,287	74.1
No party preference	David R. Hernandez	38,994	25.9
Total votes		150,281	100.0
Democratic win (new seat)			

== District 30 ==
2012 California's 30th congressional district election
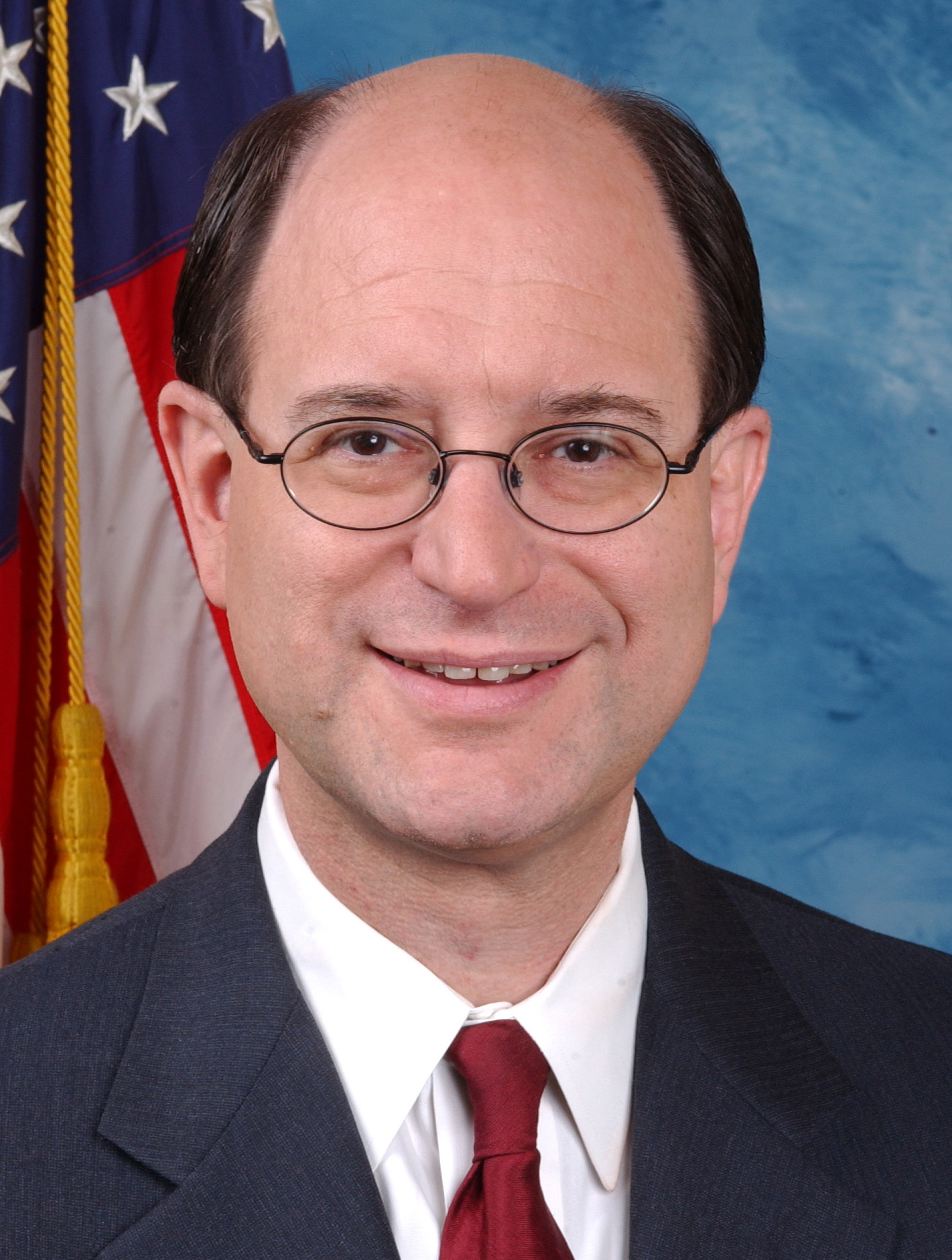

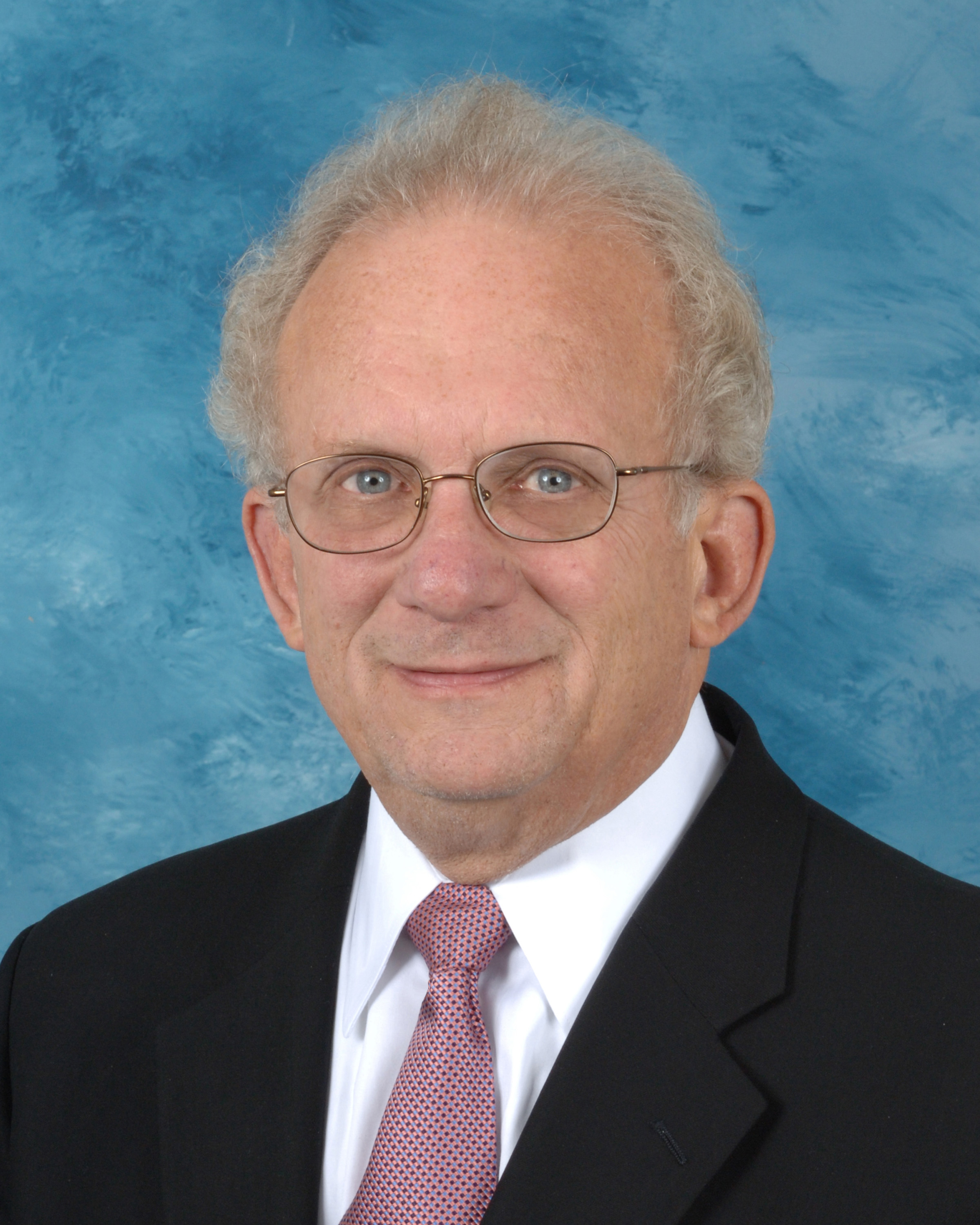
Candidate	Brad Sherman	Howard Berman
Party	Democratic	Democratic
Popular vote	149,456	98,395
Percentage	60.3%	39.7%
U.S. Representative before election
Brad Sherman
Democratic
Elected U.S. Representative
Brad Sherman
Democratic

The 30th district is based in the western San Fernando Valley and includes Sherman Oaks. Democrat Brad Sherman, who represented the 27th district from 2003 to 2013 and the 24th district from 1997 to 2003, ran for re-election against fellow Democrat Howard Berman, who represented the 28th district from 2003 to 2013 and the 26th district from 1983 to 2003.

=== Primary election ===
==== Democratic candidates ====
===== Advanced to general =====
- Howard Berman, incumbent U.S. representative for the 28th district
- Brad Sherman, incumbent U.S. representative for the 27th district

===== Eliminated in primary =====
- Vince Gilmore

==== Republican candidates ====
===== Eliminated in primary =====
- Mark Reed, actor, rancher and businessman
- Susan Shelley, novelist
- Navraj Singh, businessman and restaurateur

==== Campaign ====
At the California Democratic Party's annual convention in February 2012, Sherman received the support of more delegates than Berman, but did not reach the 60-percent threshold necessary to receive the party's endorsement. In March 2012, the California Republican Party declined to endorse any candidate while the Los Angeles County party endorsed Reed.

==== Endorsements ====
Susan Shelley (R)

Organizations

- Republican Liberty Caucus

==== Polling ====
Poll source	Date(s) administered	Sample size (Note: Key: A – all adults RV – registered voters LV – likely voters V – unclear)	Margin of error	Howard Berman (D)	Vince Gilmore (D)	Michael Powelson (G)	Mark Reed (R)	Susan Shelley (R)	Brad Sherman (D)	Navraj Singh (R)	Undecided
M4 Strategies/Tulchin Research	May 29–31, 2012	329 (LV)	± 5.4%	24%	1%	4%	10%	2%	32%	4%	23%
Feldman (D-Sherman)	March 26–28, 2012	500 (LV)	± 4.4%	17%	1%	4%	12%	5%	40%	2%	20%
Feldman (D-Sherman)	August 14–18, 2011	600 (LV)	± 5.0%	17%	—	—	26%	—	42%	—	15%

==== Results ====
Nonpartisan blanket primary results
Party	Candidate	Votes	%
Democratic	Brad Sherman (incumbent)	40,589	42.4
Democratic	Howard Berman (incumbent)	31,086	32.5
Republican	Mark Reed	11,991	12.5
Republican	Navraj Singh	5,521	5.8
Republican	Susan Shelley	3,878	4.0
Green	Michael W. Powelson	1,976	2.1
Democratic	Vince Gilmore	792	0.8
Total votes		95,833	100.0

=== General election ===
==== Campaign ====
The campaign was one of the most expensive in the nation.

==== Endorsements ====
Howard Berman (D)

Executive officials

- Barack Obama, 44th President of the United States

U.S. senators

- Barbara Boxer, U.S. senator from California
- Dianne Feinstein, U.S. senator from California
- Lindsey Graham, U.S. senator from South Carolina (Republican)
- Joe Lieberman, former U.S. senatorfrom Connecticut (Independent)
- John McCain, U.S. senator from Arizona (Republican)

U.S. representatives

- Xavier Becerra, U.S. representative from CA-31
- Mary Bono, U.S. representative from CA-45 (Republican)
- Ken Calvert, U.S. representative from CA-44 (Republican)
- Dennis Cardoza, U.S. representative from CA-18
- Jim Costa, U.S. representative from CA-20
- David Dreier, U.S. representative from CA-26 (Republican)
- Bob Filner, U.S. representative from CA-51
- Elton Gallegly, U.S. representative from CA-24 (Republican)
- John Garamendi, U.S. representative from CA-10
- Wally Herger, U.S. representative from CA-02 (Republican)
- Steny Hoyer, U.S. representative from MD-05
- Darrell Issa, U.S. representative from CA-49 (Republican)
- Barbara Lee, U.S. representative from CA-09
- Jerry Lewis, U.S. representative from CA-41 (Republican)
- Dan Lungren, U.S. representative from CA-03 (Republican)
- George Miller, U.S. representative from CA-07
- Lucille Roybal-Allard, U.S. representative from CA-34
- Ed Royce, U.S. representative from CA-40 (Republican)
- Loretta Sanchez, U.S. representative from CA-47
- Mike Thompson, U.S. representative from CA-01
- Maxine Waters, U.S. representative from CA-35
- Henry Waxman, U.S. representative from CA-30
- Lynn Woolsey, U.S. representative from CA-06

State officials

- Jerry Brown, governor of California

Labor unions

- International Alliance of Theatrical Stage Employees

Organizations

- Humane Society Legislative Fund

Newspapers

- Los Angeles Daily News
- The Los Angeles Times

Municipal officials

- Antonio Villaraigosa, mayor of Los Angeles

Individuals

- David Geffen, businessman and film producer
- Rafer Johnson, actor and decathlete
- Jeffrey Katzenberg, film producer
- Wendie Malick, actress and model
- Steven Spielberg, director
- Betty White, actress
Brad Sherman (D)

Executive officials

- Bill Clinton, 42nd President of the United States

U.S. representatives

- Judy Chu, U.S. representative from CA-32
- Grace Napolitano, U.S. representative from CA-38

State officials

- Cruz Bustamante, former lieutenant governor of California
- John Chiang, California state treasurer
- Gavin Newsom, lieutenant governor of California

Labor unions

- International Brotherhood of Boilermakers
- United Steelworkers

Organizations

- Armenian National Committee of America

Municipal officials

- Dennis Zine, Los Angeles city councillor

==== Polling ====
Poll source	Date(s) administered	Sample size	Margin of error	Howard Berman (D)	Brad Sherman (D)	Undecided
SurveyUSA	October 22–24, 2012	674 (LV)	± 3.9%	33%	44%	22%
Feldman (D-Sherman)	October 11–14, 2012	502 (LV)	± 4.4%	26%	51%	24%
Kimball Political Consulting (R)	October 12–13, 2012	422 (LV)	± 4.7%	26%	32%	42%
SurveyUSA	September 18–20, 2012	628 (LV)	± 4.0%	32%	45%	23%
Feldman (D-Sherman)	July 14–18, 2012	502 (LV)	± 4.4%	29%	46%	26%
Feldman (D-Sherman)	March 26–28, 2012	500 (LV)	± 4.4%	26%	51%	23%
Feldman (D-Sherman)	August 14–18, 2011	600 (LV)	± 5.0%	25%	52%	23%

==== Predictions ====
Source	Ranking	As of
The Cook Political Report	Safe D	November 5, 2012
Rothenberg	Safe D	November 2, 2012
Roll Call	Safe D	November 4, 2012
Sabato's Crystal Ball	Safe D	November 5, 2012
NY Times	Safe D	November 4, 2012
RCP	Safe D	November 4, 2012
The Hill	Safe D	November 4, 2012

==== Results ====
California's 30th congressional district election, 2012
Party	Candidate	Votes	%
Democratic	Brad Sherman (incumbent)	149,456	60.3
Democratic	Howard Berman (incumbent)	98,395	39.7
Total votes		247,851	100.0
Democratic hold			

== District 31 ==
2012 California's 31st congressional district election
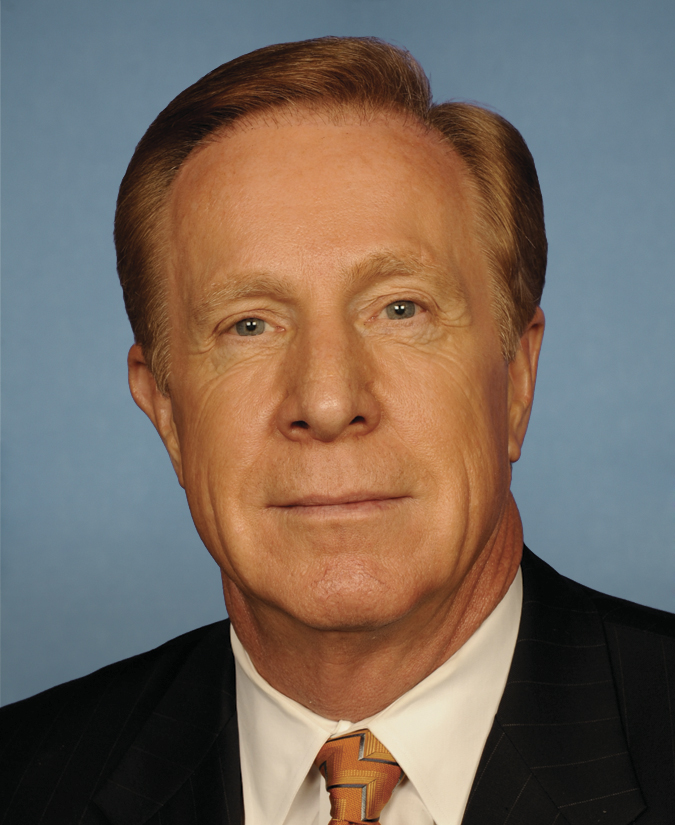

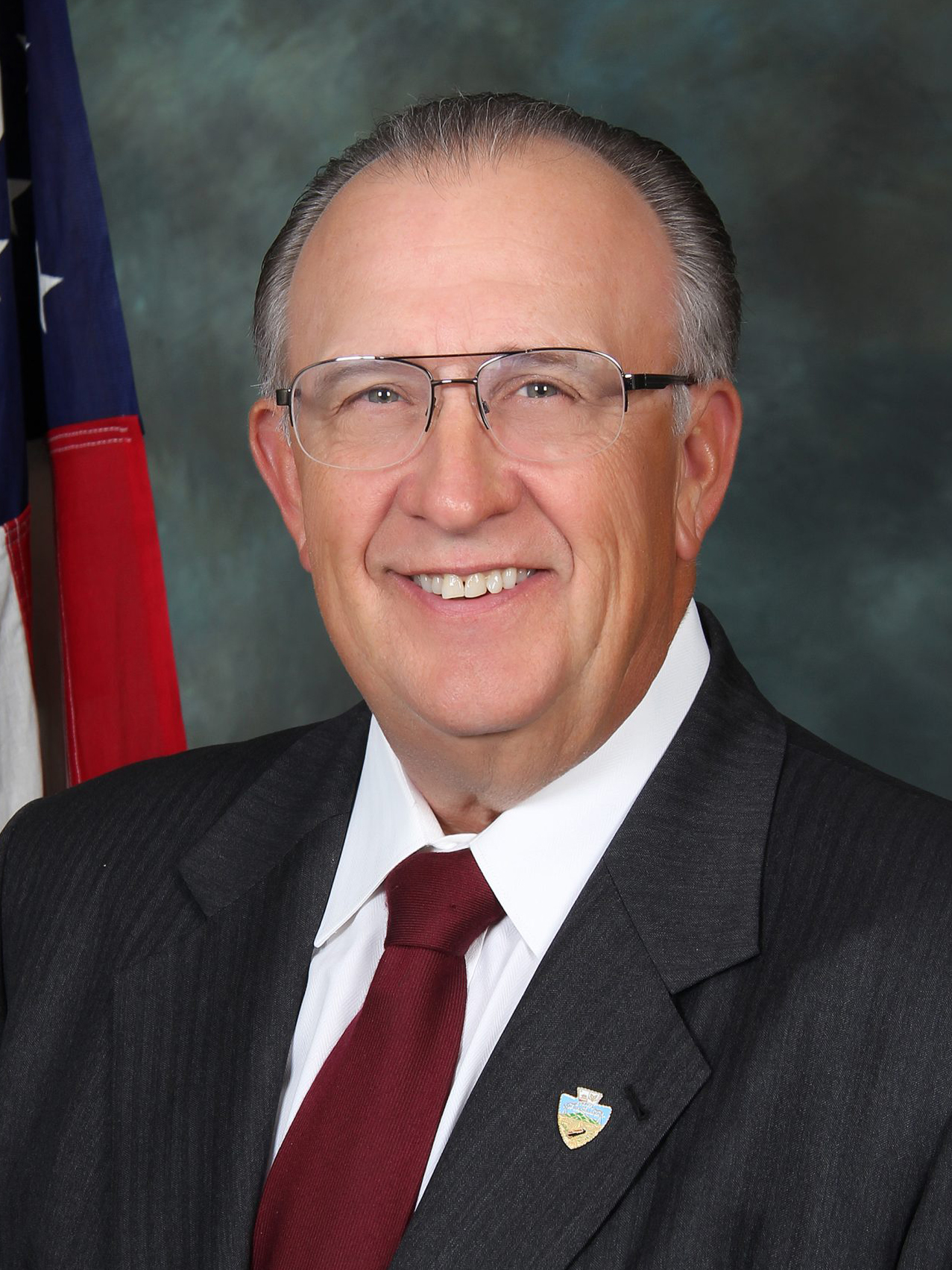
Candidate	Gary Miller	Robert Dutton
Party	Republican	Republican
Popular vote	88,964	72,255
Percentage	55.2%	44.8%
U.S. Representative before election
Gary Miller
Republican
Elected U.S. Representative
Gary Miller
Republican

The 31st district is based in the Inland Empire and includes San Bernardino and Rancho Cucamonga. Republicans David Dreier, who represented the 26th district from 2003 to 2013 and its predecessors since 1981, and Jerry Lewis, who represented the 41st district from 2003 to 2013 and its predecessors since 1979, retired. Republican Gary Miller, who represented the 42nd district from 2003 to 2013 and the 41st district from 1999 to 2003, ran for re-election here.

=== Primary election ===
==== Republican candidates ====
===== Advanced to general =====
- Robert Dutton, state senator
- Gary Miller, incumbent U.S. representative

===== Declined =====
- David Dreier, incumbent U.S. representative for the 26th district
- Jerry Lewis, incumbent U.S. representative for the 41st district
- Michael Ramos, San Bernardino County district attorney

==== Democratic candidates ====
===== Eliminated in primary =====
- Pete Aguilar, mayor of Redlands
- Justin Kim, former congressional oversight lawyer
- Rita Ramirez-Dean, community college trustee
- Renea Wickman, founder of a youth nonprofit organization

===== Declined =====
- Joe Baca, incumbent U.S. representative for the 43rd district
- Joe Baca, Jr., former state assembly member
- Russ Warner, businessman and nominee for the 26th district in 2008 & 2010

==== Campaign ====
At its February 2012 convention, the California Democratic Party did not endorse a candidate in the 31st district, while Miller was endorsed by the California Republican Party in March 2012.

==== Endorsements ====
Pete Aguilar (D)

Labor unions

- AFL-CIO

==== Results ====
Nonpartisan blanket primary results
Party	Candidate	Votes	%
Republican	Gary Miller (incumbent)	16,708	26.7
Republican	Robert Dutton	15,557	24.8
Democratic	Pete Aguilar	14,181	22.6
Democratic	Justin Kim	8,487	13.5
Democratic	Renea Wickman	4,188	6.7
Democratic	Rita Ramirez-Dean	3,546	5.7
Total votes		62,667	100.0

=== General election ===
==== Endorsements ====
Gary Miller (R)

Organizations

- Campaign for Working Families
- National Republican Congressional Committee "Patriot" Program
- National Right to Life Committee
- NRA Political Victory Fund
- United States Chamber of Commerce

==== Predictions ====
Source	Ranking	As of
The Cook Political Report	Safe R	November 5, 2012
Rothenberg	Safe R	November 2, 2012
Roll Call	Safe R	November 4, 2012
Sabato's Crystal Ball	Safe R	November 5, 2012
NY Times	Safe R	November 4, 2012
RCP	Safe R	November 4, 2012
The Hill	Safe R	November 4, 2012

==== Results ====
California's 31st congressional district election, 2012
Party	Candidate	Votes	%
Republican	Gary Miller (incumbent)	88,964	55.2
Republican	Robert Dutton	72,255	44.8
Total votes		161,219	100.0
Republican hold			

== District 32 ==
2012 California's 32nd congressional district election
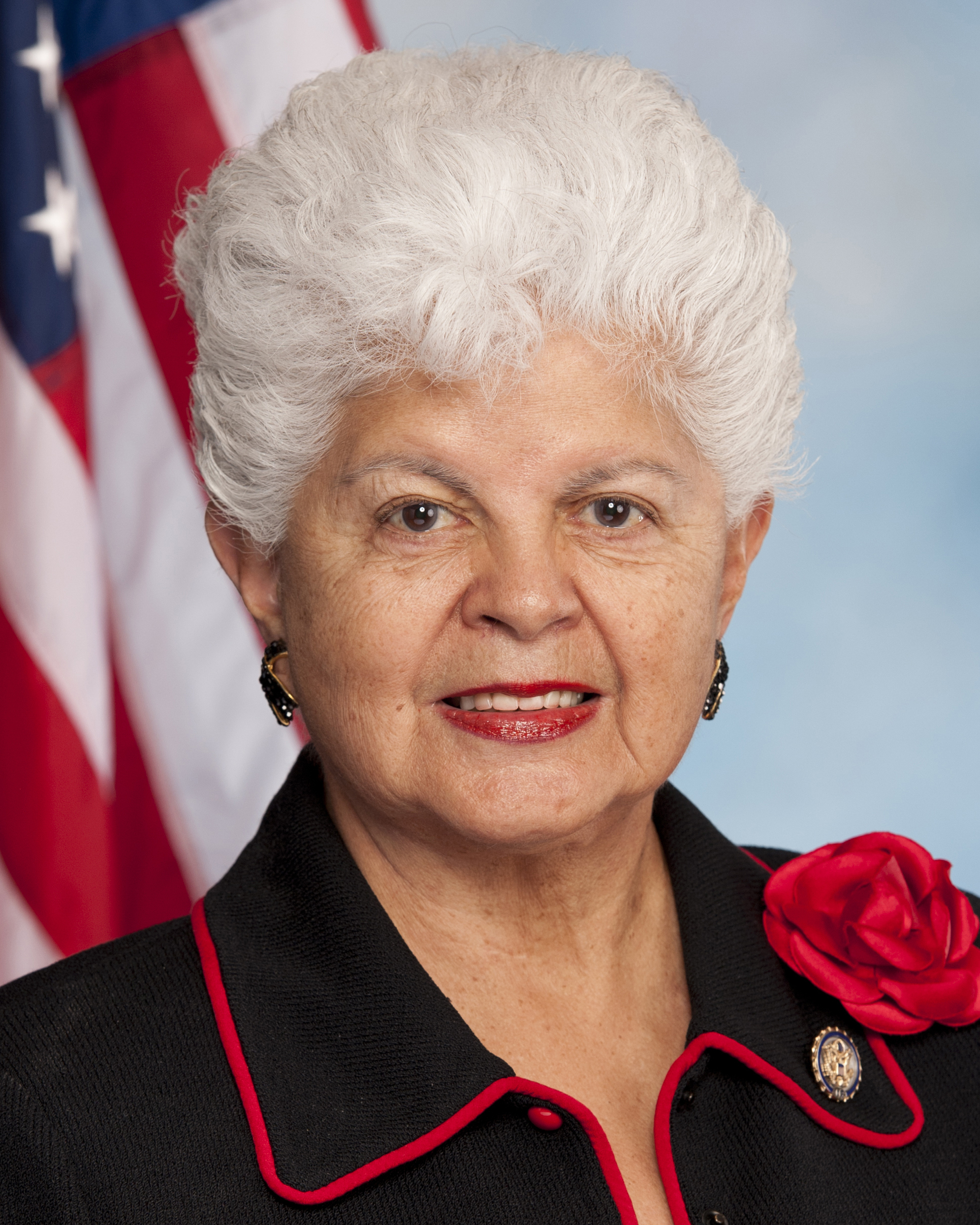

Candidate	Grace Napolitano	David Miller
Party	Democratic	Republican
Popular vote	124,903	65,208
Percentage	65.7%	34.3%
- County results Napolitano: 60–70%
U.S. Representative before election
Grace Napolitano
Democratic
Elected U.S. Representative
Grace Napolitano
Democratic

The 32nd district is based in the San Gabriel Valley and includes El Monte and West Covina. Republican David Dreier, who represented the 26th district from 2003 to 2013 and its predecessors since 1978, retired. Democrat Grace Napolitano, who represented the 38th district from 2003 to 2013 and the 34th district from 1999 to 2003, ran for re-election here.

=== Primary election ===
==== Democratic candidates ====
===== Advanced to general =====
- Grace Napolitano, incumbent U.S. representative

===== Eliminated in primary =====
- Bill Gonzalez, former deputy state director and senior advisor to U.S. Senator Dianne Feinstein

===== Withdrawn =====
- Roger Hernandez, state assembly member
- Norma Macias, El Monte council member

===== Declined =====
- Linda Sánchez, incumbent U.S. representative for the 39th district

==== Republican candidates ====
===== Advanced to general =====
- David Miller, CEO of Pacific Development Incorporated

==== Campaign ====
Napolitano was endorsed by the California Democratic Party in February 2012.

==== Endorsements ====
Grace Napolitano (D)

Labor unions

- AFL-CIO

==== Results ====
Nonpartisan blanket primary results
Party	Candidate	Votes	%
Democratic	Grace Napolitano (incumbent)	24,094	46.1
Republican	David Miller	21,843	41.8
Democratic	G. Bill Gonzalez	6,322	12.1
Total votes		52,259	100.0

=== General election ===
==== Endorsements ====
Grace Napolitano (D)

Labor unions

- AFL-CIO
- International Brotherhood of Boilermakers
- National Association of Letter Carriers

Organizations

- Human Rights Campaign
- National Organization for Women
- Sierra Club

==== Predictions ====
Source	Ranking	As of
The Cook Political Report	Safe D	November 5, 2012
Rothenberg	Safe D	November 2, 2012
Roll Call	Safe D	November 4, 2012
Sabato's Crystal Ball	Safe D	November 5, 2012
NY Times	Safe D	November 4, 2012
RCP	Safe D	November 4, 2012
The Hill	Safe D	November 4, 2012

==== Results ====
California's 32nd congressional district election, 2012
Party	Candidate	Votes	%
Democratic	Grace Napolitano (incumbent)	124,903	65.7
Republican	David Miller	65,208	34.3
Total votes		190,111	100.0
Democratic hold			

== District 33 ==
2012 California's 33rd congressional district election
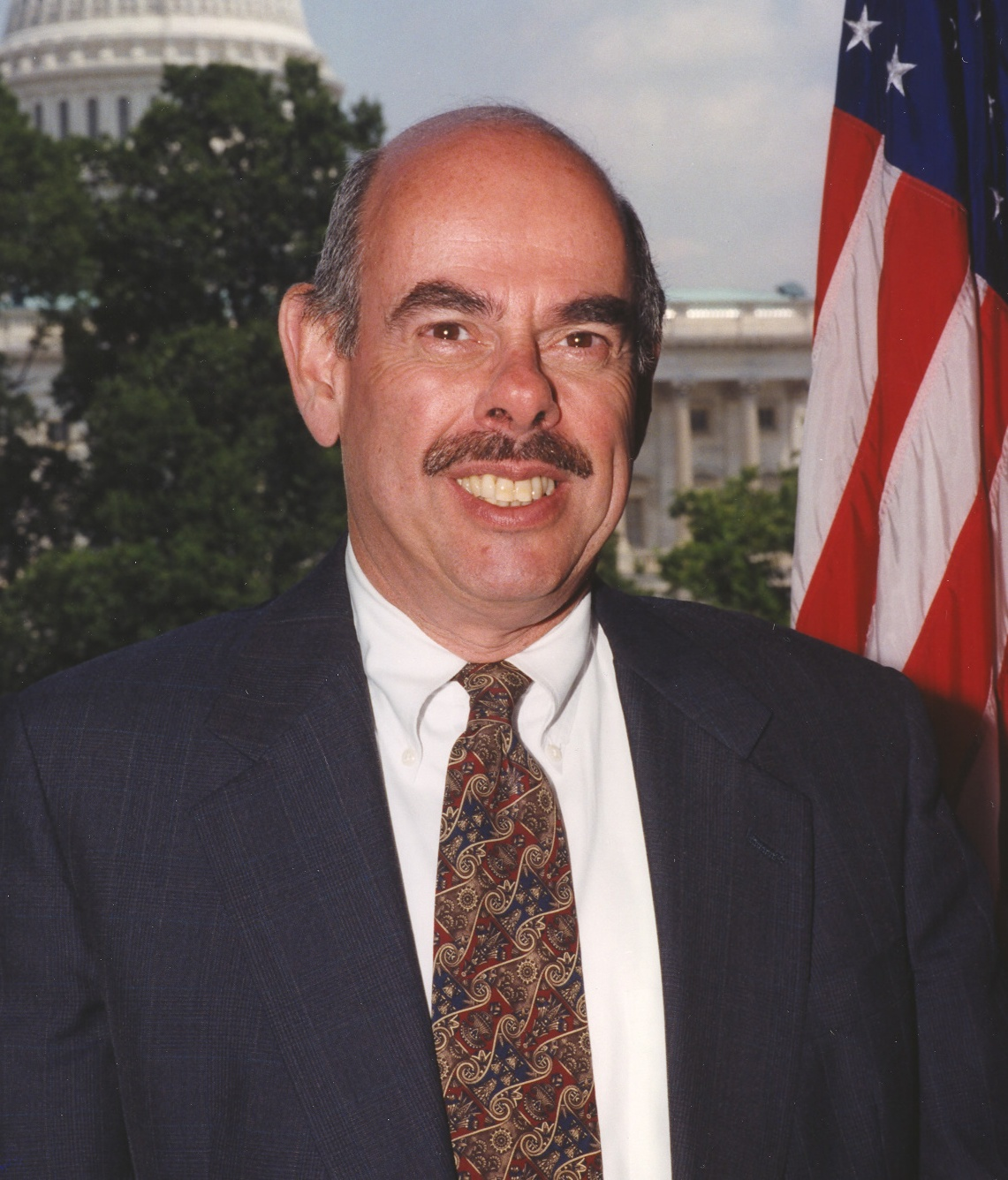

Candidate	Henry Waxman	Bill Bloomfield
Party	Democratic	No party preference
Popular vote	171,860	146,660
Percentage	54.0%	46.0%
- County results Waxman: 50–60%
U.S. Representative before election
Henry Waxman
Democratic
Elected U.S. Representative
Henry Waxman
Democratic

The 33rd district is based in coastal Los Angeles County and includes Beverly Hills and Santa Monica. Democrat Henry Waxman, who represented the 30th district from 2003 to 2013 and the 24th and 29th districts from 1975 to 1993 and 1993 to 2003 respectively, ran for re-election here.

=== Primary election ===
==== Democratic candidates ====
===== Advanced to general =====
- Henry Waxman, incumbent U.S. representative

===== Eliminated in primary =====
- Bruce Margolin, attorney
- Zein Obagi, attorney
- Tim Pape

==== Republican candidates ====
===== Eliminated in primary =====
- Christopher David, entrepreneur

==== Independent candidates ====
===== Advanced to general =====
- Bill Bloomfield, businessman

==== Green candidates ====
===== Eliminated in primary =====
- David Steinman

==== Libertarian candidates ====
===== Eliminated in primary =====
- Steve Collett, certified public accountants

==== Campaign ====
Waxman received the endorsement of the California Democratic Party in February 2012. In March 2012, the California Republican Party declined to endorse David.

==== Endorsements ====
Henry Waxman (D)

Labor unions

- AFL-CIO
Christopher David (R)

Organizations

- Republican Liberty Caucus

==== Results ====
Nonpartisan blanket primary results
Party	Candidate	Votes	%
Democratic	Henry Waxman (incumbent)	51,235	45.3
No party preference	Bill Bloomfield	27,850	24.6
Republican	Christopher David	17,264	15.3
Democratic	Bruce Margolin	5,020	4.4
Libertarian	Steve Collett	4,916	4.3
Green	David William Steinman	3,940	3.5
Democratic	Zein E. Obagi	1,988	1.8
Democratic	Tim Pape	847	0.7
Total votes		113,060	100.0

=== General election ===
==== Endorsements ====
Henry Waxman (D)

Labor unions

- AFL-CIO
- International Brotherhood of Boilermakers
- National Association of Letter Carriers

Organizations

- Human Rights Campaign
- National Organization for Women
- Sierra Club

==== Predictions ====
Source	Ranking	As of
The Cook Political Report	Safe D	November 5, 2012
Rothenberg	Safe D	November 2, 2012
Roll Call	Safe D	November 4, 2012
Sabato's Crystal Ball	Safe D	November 5, 2012
NY Times	Safe D	November 4, 2012
RCP	Safe D	November 4, 2012
The Hill	Safe D	November 4, 2012

==== Results ====
California's 33rd congressional district election, 2012
Party	Candidate	Votes	%
Democratic	Henry Waxman (incumbent)	171,860	54.0
No party preference	Bill Bloomfield	146,660	46.0
Majority		25,200	8.0
Total votes		318,520	100.0
Democratic hold			

== District 34 ==
2012 California's 34th congressional district election
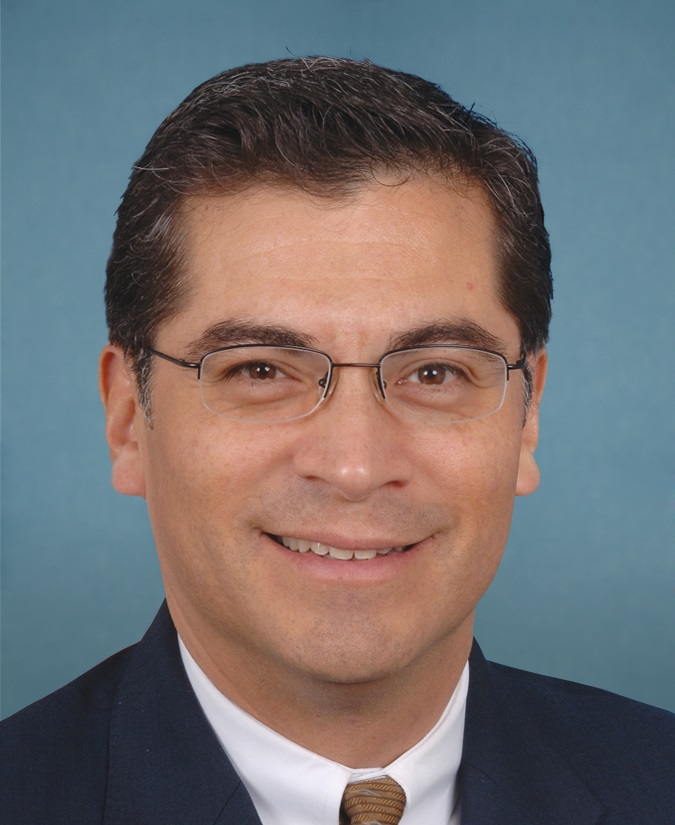

Candidate	Xavier Becerra	Stephen C. Smith
Party	Democratic	Republican
Popular vote	120,367	20,223
Percentage	85.6%	14.4%
- County results Becerra: 80–90%
U.S. Representative before election
Xavier Becerra
Democratic
Elected U.S. Representative
Xavier Becerra
Democratic

The 34th district is based in central Los Angeles and includes Chinatown and Downtown Los Angeles. Democrat Xavier Becerra, who represented the 31st district from 2003 to 2013 and the 30th district from 1993 to 2003, ran for re-election here.

=== Democratic candidates ===
==== Advanced to general ====
- Xavier Becerra, incumbent U.S. representative

=== Primary election ===
==== Republican candidates ====
===== Advanced to general =====
- Stephen Smith, former Radio Shack employee

==== Campaign ====
Becerra was endorsed by the California Democratic Party in February 2012.

==== Endorsements ====
Xavier Becerra (D)

Labor unions

- AFL-CIO

==== Results ====
Nonpartisan blanket primary results
Party	Candidate	Votes	%
Democratic	Xavier Becerra (incumbent)	27,939	77.3
Republican	Stephen C. Smith	5,739	16.0
Peace and Freedom	Howard Johnson	2,407	6.7
Total votes		36,085	100.0

=== General election ===
==== Endorsements ====
Xavier Becerra (D)

Labor unions

- AFL-CIO
- International Brotherhood of Boilermakers
- National Association of Letter Carriers

Organizations

- Human Rights Campaign
- Sierra Club

==== Predictions ====
Source	Ranking	As of
The Cook Political Report	Safe D	November 5, 2012
Rothenberg	Safe D	November 2, 2012
Roll Call	Safe D	November 4, 2012
Sabato's Crystal Ball	Safe D	November 5, 2012
NY Times	Safe D	November 4, 2012
RCP	Safe D	November 4, 2012
The Hill	Safe D	November 4, 2012

==== Results ====
California's 34th congressional district election, 2012
Party	Candidate	Votes	%
Democratic	Xavier Becerra (incumbent)	120,367	85.6
Republican	Stephen C. Smith	20,223	14.4
Total votes		140,590	100.0
Democratic hold			

== District 35 ==
2012 California's 35th congressional district election
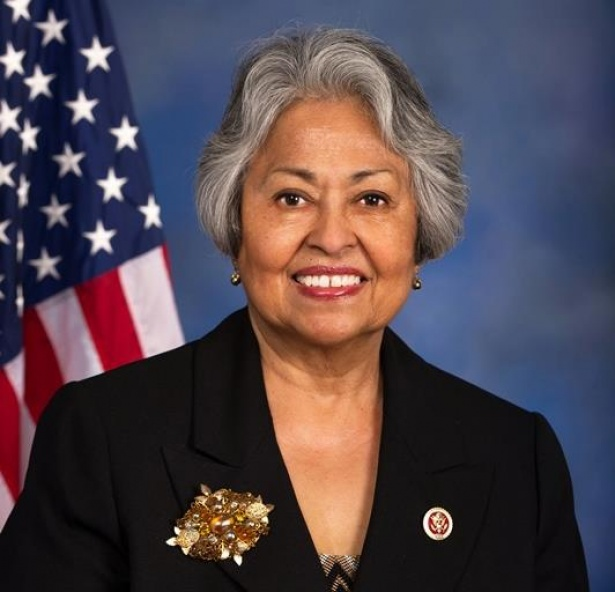

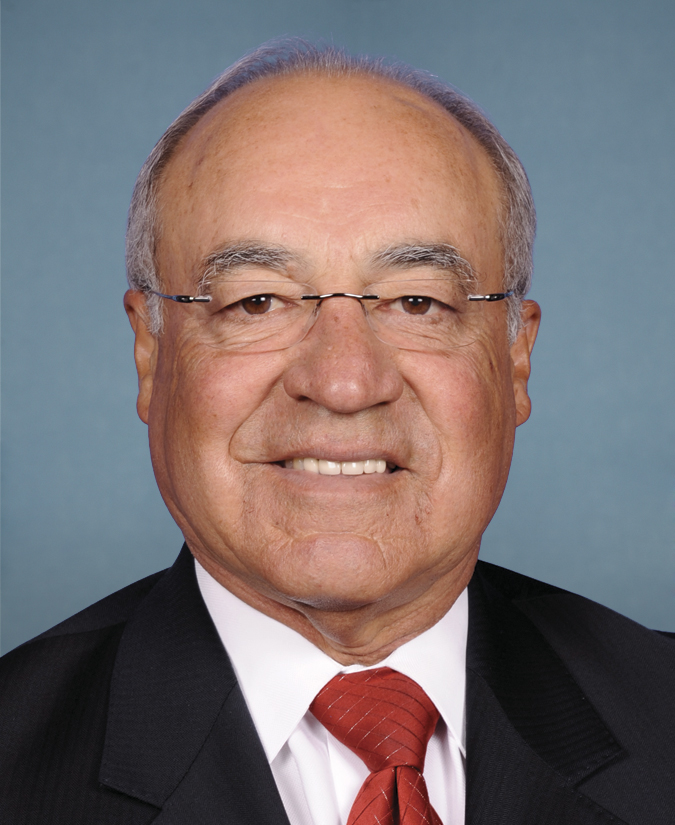
Candidate	Gloria Negrete McLeod	Joe Baca
Party	Democratic	Democratic
Popular vote	79,698	62,982
Percentage	55.9%	44.1%
U.S. Representative before election
Joe Baca
Democratic
Elected U.S. Representative
Gloria Negrete McLeod
Democratic

The 35th district is based in the Inland Empire and includes Fontana, Ontario, and Pomona. Democrat Joe Baca, who represented the 43rd district from 2003 to 2013 and the 42nd district from 1999 to 2003, ran for re-election here.

=== Primary election ===
==== Democratic candidates ====
===== Advanced to general =====
- Joe Baca, incumbent U.S. representative
- Gloria Negrete McLeod, state senator

==== Green candidates ====
===== Eliminated in primary =====
- Anthony Vieyra, former IRS employee

==== Campaign ====
Baca was endorsed by the California Democratic Party in February 2012.

==== Endorsements ====
Joe Baca (D)

Labor unions

- AFL-CIO

Organizations

- Blue Dog Coalition

==== Results ====
Nonpartisan blanket primary results
Party	Candidate	Votes	%
Democratic	Joe Baca (incumbent)	15,388	45.0
Democratic	Gloria Negrete McLeod	12,425	36.3
Green	Anthony W. Vieyra	6,372	18.6
Total votes		34,185	100.0

=== General election ===
==== Endorsements ====
Joe Baca (D)

Labor unions

- AFL-CIO
- International Brotherhood of Boilermakers
- National Association of Letter Carriers

Organizations

- Blue Dog Coalition
- Human Rights Campaign
Gloria Negrete McLeod (D)

Organizations

- EMILY's List

==== Predictions ====
Source	Ranking	As of
The Cook Political Report	Safe D	November 5, 2012
Rothenberg	Safe D	November 2, 2012
Roll Call	Safe D	November 4, 2012
Sabato's Crystal Ball	Safe D	November 5, 2012
NY Times	Safe D	November 4, 2012
RCP	Safe D	November 4, 2012
The Hill	Safe D	November 4, 2012

==== Results ====
California's 35th congressional district election, 2012
Party	Candidate	Votes	%
Democratic	Gloria Negrete McLeod	79,698	55.9
Democratic	Joe Baca (incumbent)	62,982	44.1
Total votes		142,680	100.0
Democratic hold			

== District 36 ==
2012 California's 36th congressional district election
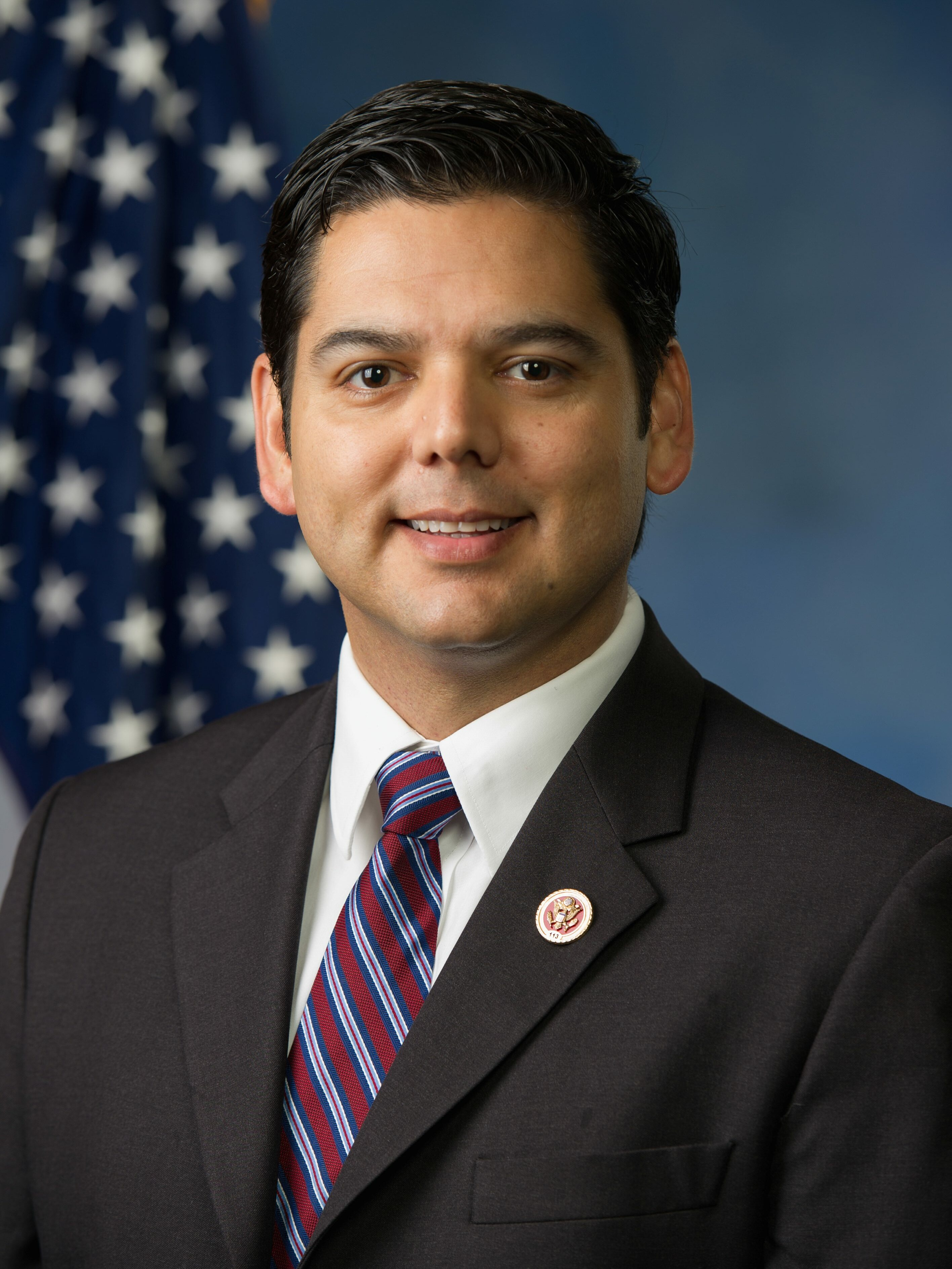

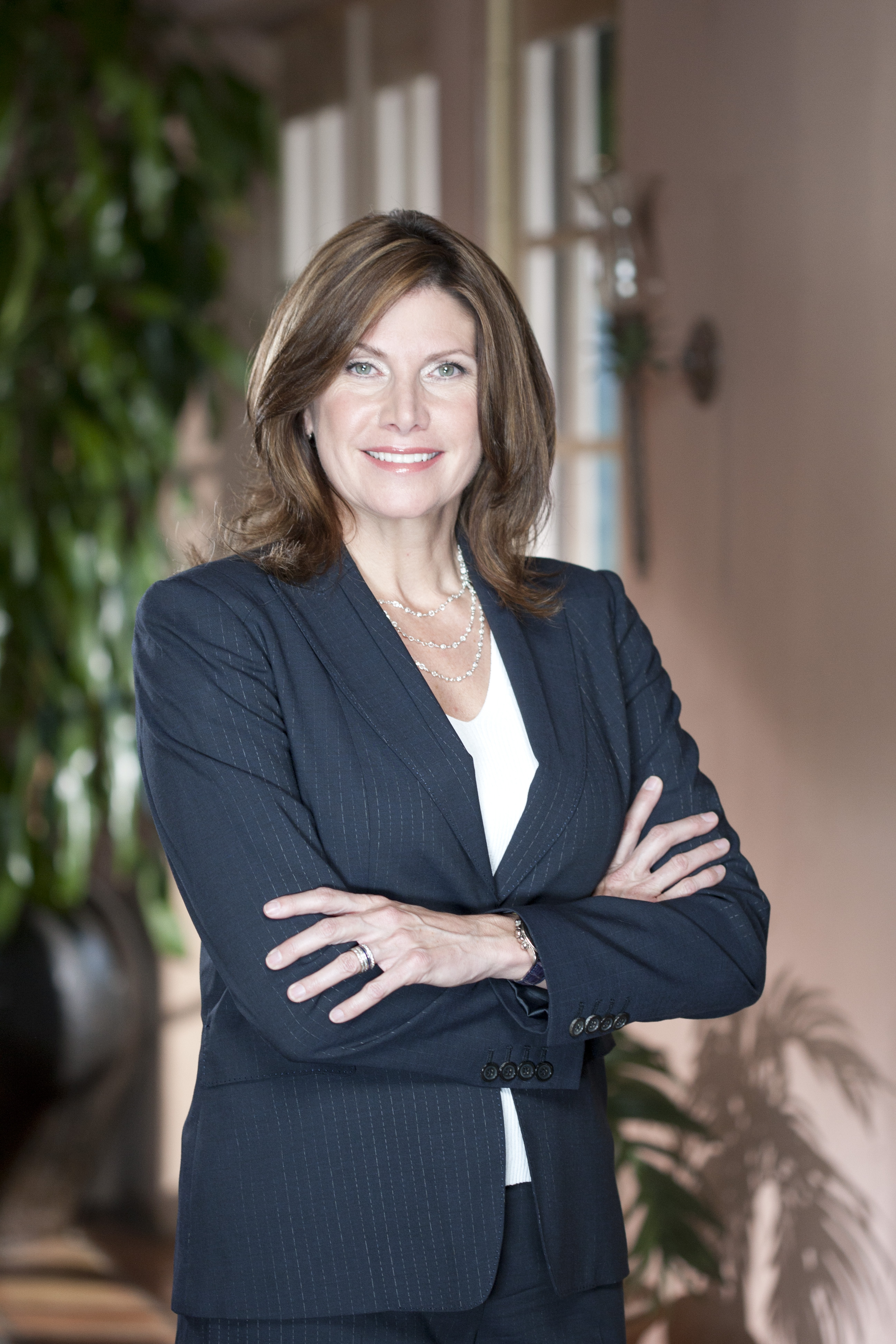
Candidate	Raul Ruiz	Mary Bono Mack
Party	Democratic	Republican
Popular vote	110,189	97,953
Percentage	52.9%	47.1%
- County results Ruiz: 50–60%
U.S. Representative before election
Mary Bono Mack
Republican
Elected U.S. Representative
Raul Ruiz
Democratic

The 36th district is based in eastern Riverside County and includes Palm Springs. Republican Mary Bono Mack, who represented the 45th district from 2003 to 2013 and the 44th district from 1998 to 2003, ran for re-election here.

=== Primary election ===
==== Republican candidates ====
===== Advanced to general =====
- Mary Bono Mack, incumbent U.S. representative

==== Democratic candidates ====
===== Advanced to general =====
- Raul Ruiz, physician

===== Declined =====
- Manuel Pérez, state assembly member
- Steve Pougnet, mayor of Palm Springs and nominee for the 45th district in 2010

==== Campaign ====
Ruiz received the endorsement of the California Democratic Party in February 2012. Bono Mack was endorsed by the California Republican Party in March 2012.

==== Endorsements ====
Raul Ruiz (D)

Labor unions

- AFL-CIO

==== Results ====
Nonpartisan blanket primary results
Party	Candidate	Votes	%
Republican	Mary Bono Mack (incumbent)	52,474	58.1
Democratic	Raul Ruiz	37,847	41.9
Total votes		90,321	100.0

=== General election ===
==== Endorsements ====
Mary Bono Mack (R)

Organizations

- GOProud
- Maggie's List
- NRA Political Victory Fund
- United States Chamber of Commerce
Raul Ruiz (D)

Labor unions

- AFL-CIO
- International Brotherhood of Boilermakers
- National Association of Letter Carriers

Organizations

- Democracy for America
- Democratic Congressional Campaign Committee "Red to Blue" Program
- National Organization for Women
- Sierra Club

==== Debates ====
- Complete video of debate, October 12, 2012

==== Polling ====
Poll source	Date(s) administered	Sample size	Margin of error	Mary Bono Mack (R)	Raul Ruiz (D)	Undecided
Lake Research Partners (D-Ruiz)	October 20–22, 2012	402 (LV)	± 4.9%	42%	48%	7%
Public Policy Polling (D-Democracy for America)	October 12–14, 2012	1,364 (LV)	± 2.7%	46%	47%	7%
Lake Research Partners (D-Ruiz)	October 2–4, 2012	406 (LV)	± 4.9%	43%	46%	9%
Public Policy Polling (D-Democracy for America)	September 12–13, 2012	1,281 (LV)	± 2.7%	47%	44%	9%

==== Predictions ====
Source	Ranking	As of
The Cook Political Report	Tossup	November 5, 2012
Rothenberg	Tilt R	November 2, 2012
Roll Call	Tossup	November 4, 2012
Sabato's Crystal Ball	Lean R	November 5, 2012
NY Times	Lean R	November 4, 2012
RCP	Tossup	November 4, 2012
The Hill	Tossup	November 4, 2012

==== Results ====
California's 36th congressional district election, 2012
Party	Candidate	Votes	%
Democratic	Raul Ruiz	110,189	52.9
Republican	Mary Bono Mack (incumbent)	97,953	47.1
Majority		12,236	5.8
Total votes		208,142	100.0
Democratic gain from Republican			

== District 37 ==
2012 California's 37th congressional district election
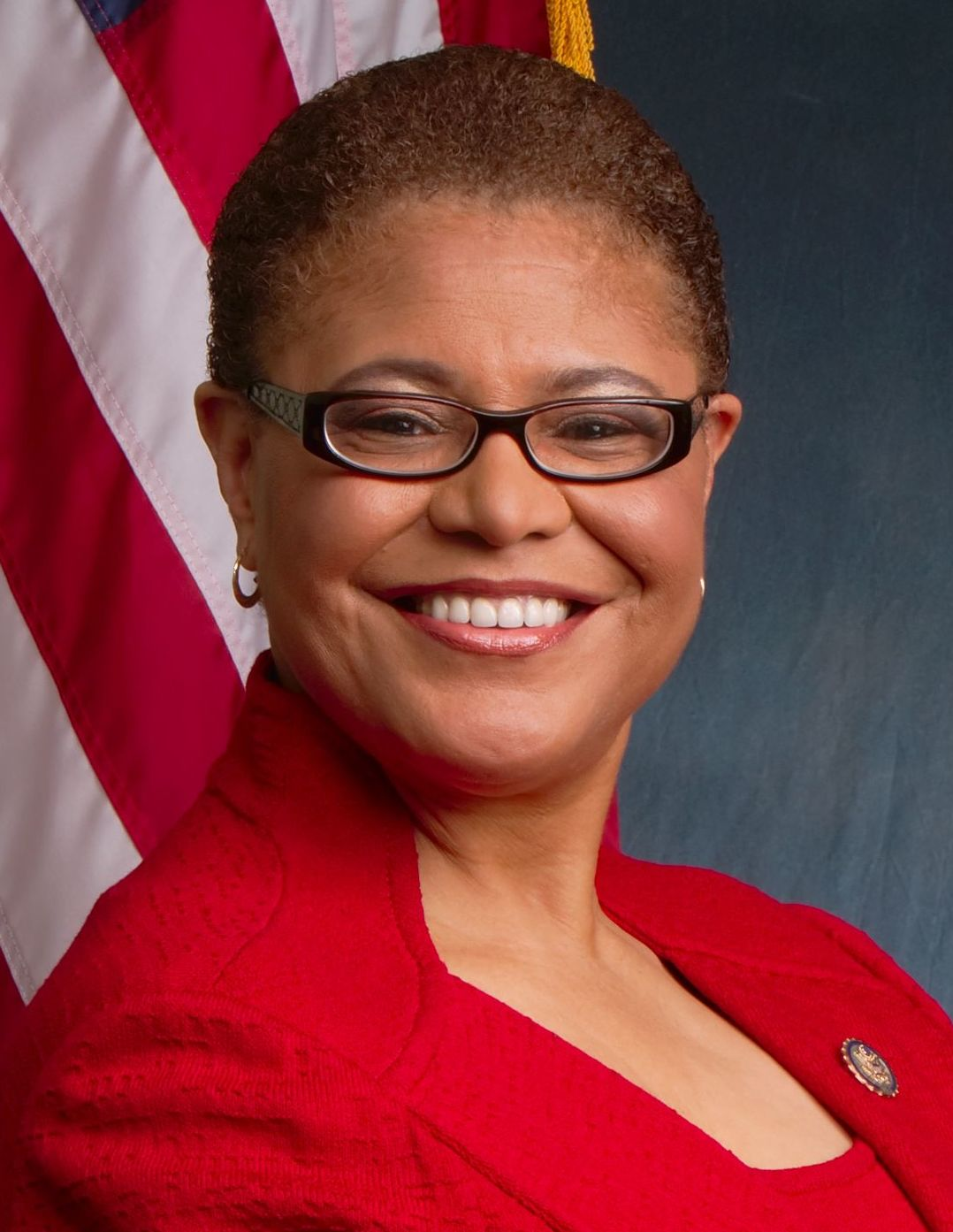

Candidate	Karen Bass	Morgan Osborne
Party	Democratic	Republican
Popular vote	207,039	32,541
Percentage	86.4%	13.6%
- County results Bass: 80–90%
U.S. Representative before election
Karen Bass
Democratic
Elected U.S. Representative
Karen Bass
Democratic

The 37th district is based in West Los Angeles and includes Crenshaw and Culver City. Democrat Karen Bass, who represented the 33rd district from 2011 to 2013, ran for re-election here.

=== Primary election ===
==== Democratic candidates ====
===== Advanced to general =====
- Karen Bass, incumbent U.S. representative

===== Withdrawn =====
- Mervin Evans

===== Declined =====
- Maxine Waters, incumbent U.S. representative for the 35th district

==== Republican candidates ====
===== Advanced to general =====
- Morgan Osborne (write-in)

==== Campaign ====
Bass was endorsed by the California Democratic Party in February 2012.

==== Endorsements ====
Karen Bass (D)

Labor unions

- AFL-CIO

==== Results ====
Nonpartisan blanket primary results
Party	Candidate	Votes	%
Democratic	Karen Bass (incumbent)	54,345	99.9
Republican	Morgan Osborne (write-in)	36	0.1
Peace and Freedom	Adam Shbeita (write-in)	8	0.0
Libertarian	Sean P. McGray (write-in)	4	0.0
Total votes		54,393	100.0

=== General election ===
==== Endorsements ====
Karen Bass (D)

Labor unions

- AFL-CIO
- International Brotherhood of Boilermakers
- National Association of Letter Carriers

Organizations

- National Organization for Women
- Sierra Club

==== Predictions ====
Source	Ranking	As of
The Cook Political Report	Safe D	November 5, 2012
Rothenberg	Safe D	November 2, 2012
Roll Call	Safe D	November 4, 2012
Sabato's Crystal Ball	Safe D	November 5, 2012
NY Times	Safe D	November 4, 2012
RCP	Safe D	November 4, 2012
The Hill	Safe D	November 4, 2012

==== Results ====
California's 37th congressional district election, 2012
Party	Candidate	Votes	%
Democratic	Karen Bass (incumbent)	207,039	86.4
Republican	Morgan Osborne	32,541	13.6
Total votes		239,580	100.0
Democratic hold			

== District 38 ==
2012 California's 38th congressional district election
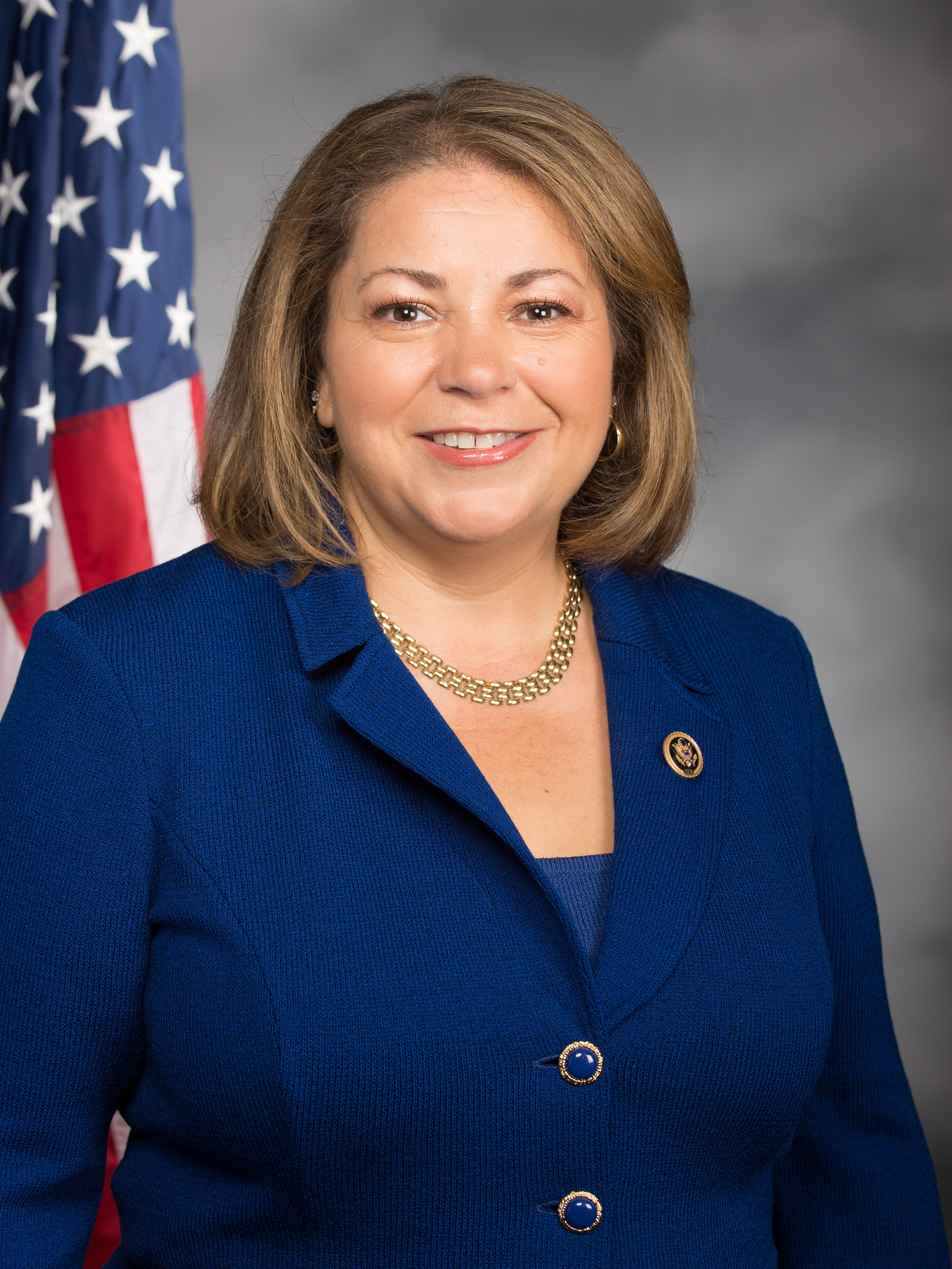

Candidate	Linda Sánchez	Benjamin Campos
Party	Democratic	Republican
Popular vote	145,280	69,807
Percentage	67.5%	32.5%
- County results Sanchez: 60–70% Campos: 50–60%
U.S. Representative before election
Linda Sánchez
Democratic
Elected U.S. Representative
Linda Sánchez
Democratic

The 38th district is based in the eastern Los Angeles suburbs and includes Norwalk and Whittier. Democrat Linda Sánchez, who represented the 39th district from 2003 to 2013, ran for re-election here.

=== Primary election ===
==== Democratic candidates ====
===== Advanced to general =====
- Linda Sánchez, incumbent U.S. representative

===== Withdrawn =====
- Ronald Calderon, state senator

===== Declined =====
- Grace Napolitano, incumbent U.S. representative for the 38th district

==== Republican candidates ====
===== Advanced to general =====
- Benjamin Campos, certified public accountant

===== Eliminated in primary =====
- Jorge Robles, law enforcement professional

==== Campaign ====
Sánchez received the endorsement of the California Democratic Party in February 2012.

==== Endorsements ====
Linda Sánchez (D)

Labor unions

- AFL-CIO

==== Results ====
Nonpartisan blanket primary results
Party	Candidate	Votes	%
Democratic	Linda Sánchez (incumbent)	33,223	56.0
Republican	Benjamin Campos	13,363	22.5
Republican	Jorge Robles	12,713	21.4
Total votes		59,299	100.0

=== General election ===
==== Endorsements ====
Linda Sánchez (D)

Labor unions

- AFL-CIO
- International Brotherhood of Boilermakers
- National Association of Letter Carriers

Organizations

- Human Rights Campaign
- National Organization for Women
- Sierra Club

==== Predictions ====
Source	Ranking	As of
The Cook Political Report	Safe D	November 5, 2012
Rothenberg	Safe D	November 2, 2012
Roll Call	Safe D	November 4, 2012
Sabato's Crystal Ball	Safe D	November 5, 2012
NY Times	Safe D	November 4, 2012
RCP	Safe D	November 4, 2012
The Hill	Safe D	November 4, 2012

==== Results ====
California's 38th congressional district election, 2012
Party	Candidate	Votes	%
Democratic	Linda Sánchez (incumbent)	145,280	67.5
Republican	Benjamin Campos	69,807	32.5
Total votes		215,087	100.0
Democratic hold			

== District 39 ==
2012 California's 39th congressional district election
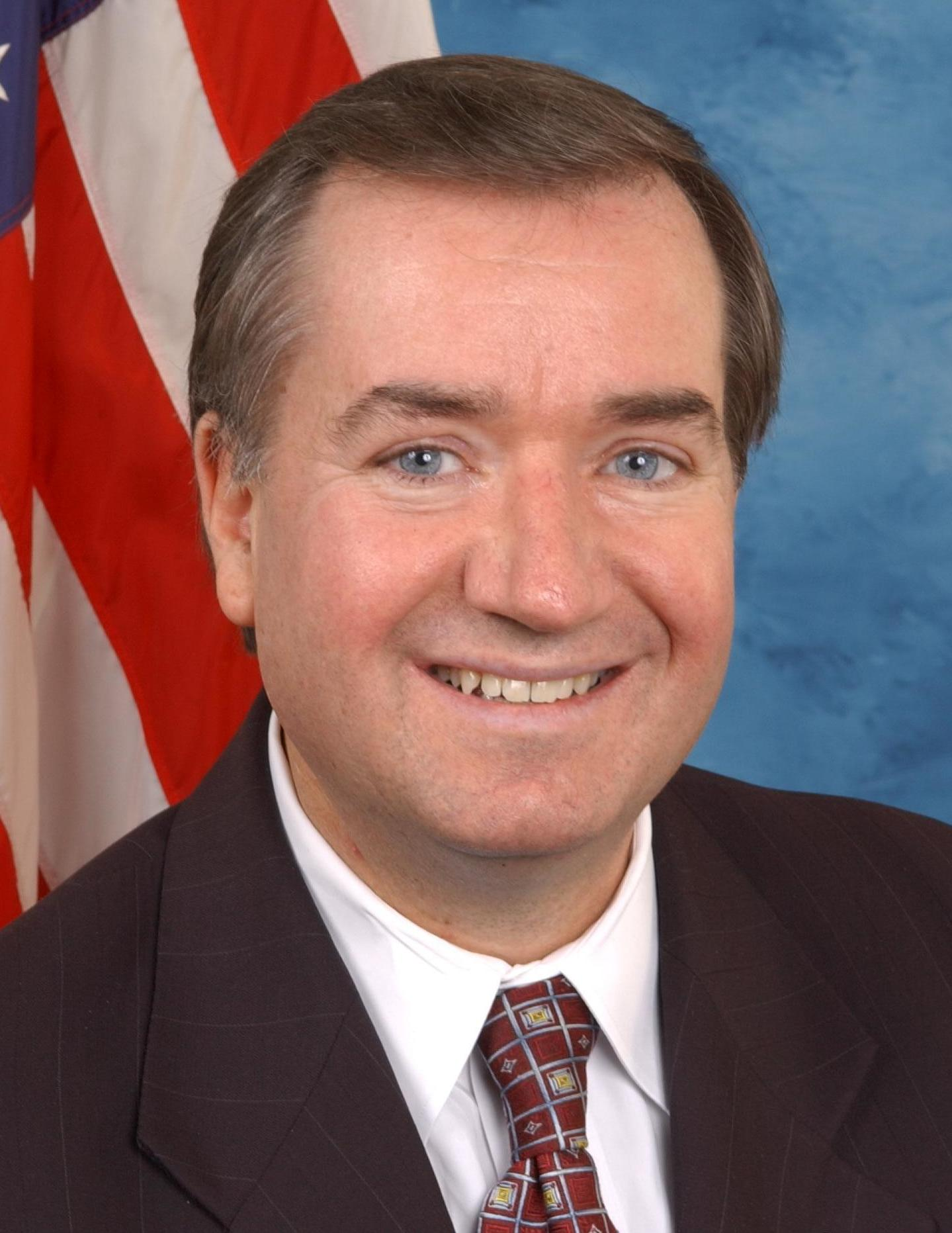

Candidate	Ed Royce	Jay Chen
Party	Republican	Democratic
Popular vote	145,607	106,360
Percentage	57.8%	42.2%
- County results Royce: 50–60% 60–70% Chen: 50–60%
U.S. Representative before election
Ed Royce
Republican
Elected U.S. Representative
Ed Royce
Republican

The 39th district straddles the Los Angeles–Orange county border and includes Chino Hills, Diamond Bar, and Fullerton. Republican Ed Royce, who represented the 40th district from 2003 to 2013 and the 39th district from 1993 to 2003, ran for re-election here.

=== Primary election ===
==== Republican candidates ====
===== Advanced to general =====
- Ed Royce, incumbent U.S. representative

==== Democratic candidates ====
===== Advanced to general =====
- Jay Chen, member of the Hacienda La Puente Unified School District board

==== Campaign ====
Chen was endorsed by the California Democratic Party in February 2012.

==== Endorsements ====
Jay Chen (D)

Labor unions

- AFL-CIO

==== Results ====
Nonpartisan blanket primary results
Party	Candidate	Votes	%
Republican	Ed Royce (incumbent)	62,874	66.3
Democratic	Jay Chen	28,457	30.0
No party preference	D'Marie Mulattieri	3,561	3.8
Total votes		94,892	100.0

=== General election ===
==== Endorsements ====
Ed Royce (R)

Organizations

- National Right to Life Committee
- NRA Political Victory Fund
- United States Chamber of Commerce
Jay Chen (D)

Labor unions

- AFL-CIO
- International Brotherhood of Boilermakers

==== Predictions ====
Source	Ranking	As of
The Cook Political Report	Safe R	November 5, 2012
Rothenberg	Safe R	November 2, 2012
Roll Call	Safe R	November 4, 2012
Sabato's Crystal Ball	Safe R	November 5, 2012
NY Times	Safe R	November 4, 2012
RCP	Safe R	November 4, 2012
The Hill	Safe R	November 4, 2012

==== Results ====
California's 39th congressional district election, 2012
Party	Candidate	Votes	%
Republican	Ed Royce (incumbent)	145,607	57.8
Democratic	Jay Chen	106,360	42.2
Majority		39,247	15.6
Total votes		251,967	100.0
Republican hold			

==== Aftermath ====
Jay Chen did much better than previous Royce opponents among the Asian American community, earning 62% of the overall Asian American vote, and 95% of the Chinese American vote.

== District 40 ==
2012 California's 40th congressional district election
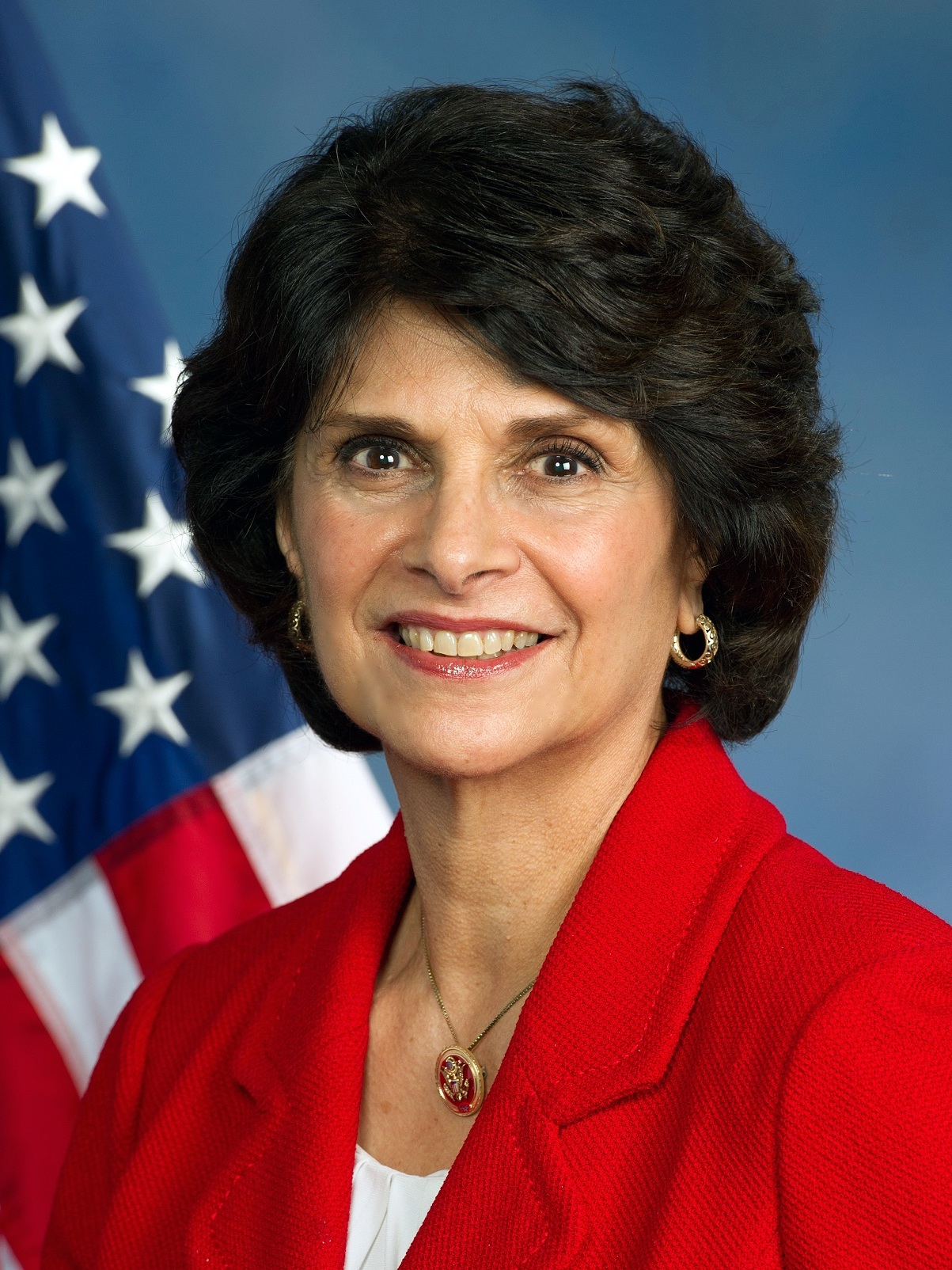

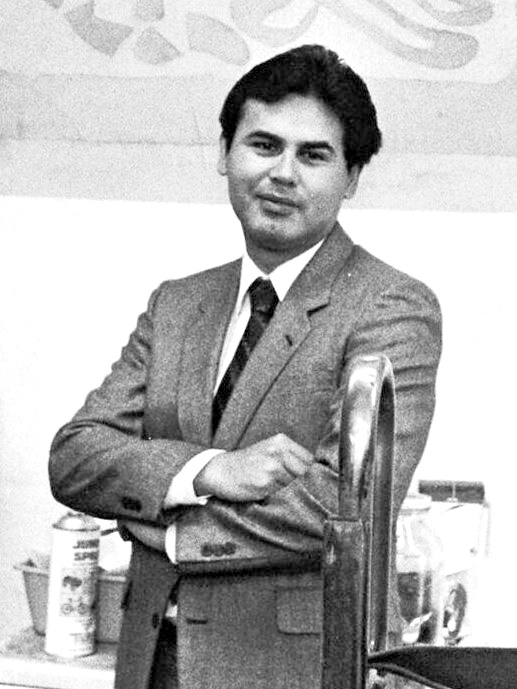
Candidate	Lucille Roybal-Allard	David Sanchez
Party	Democratic	Democratic
Popular vote	73,940	51,613
Percentage	58.9%	41.1%
U.S. Representative before election
Lucille Roybal-Allard
Democratic
Elected U.S. Representative
Lucille Roybal-Allard
Democratic

The 40th district is based in central Los Angeles County and includes Downey and East Los Angeles. Democrat Lucille Roybal-Allard, who represented the 34th district from 2003 to 2013 and the 33rd district from 1993 to 2003, ran for re-election here.

=== Primary election ===
==== Democratic candidates ====
===== Advanced to general =====
- Lucille Roybal-Allard, incumbent U.S. representative
- David Sanchez, civil rights activist

===== Declined =====
- Linda Sánchez, incumbent U.S. representative for the 39th district

==== Republican candidates ====
No Republicans filed.

==== Campaign ====
Roybal-Allard received the endorsement of the California Democratic Party in February 2012.

==== Endorsements ====
Lucille Roybal-Allard (D)

Labor unions

- AFL-CIO

==== Results ====
Nonpartisan blanket primary results
Party	Candidate	Votes	%
Democratic	Lucille Roybal-Allard (incumbent)	16,596	65.4
Democratic	David Sanchez	8,777	34.6
Total votes		25,373	100.0

=== General election ===
==== Endorsements ====
Lucille Roybal-Allard (D)

Labor unions

- AFL-CIO
- International Brotherhood of Boilermakers
- National Association of Letter Carriers

Organizations

- Human Rights Campaign
- National Organization for Women
- Sierra Club

==== Predictions ====
Source	Ranking	As of
The Cook Political Report	Safe D	November 5, 2012
Rothenberg	Safe D	November 2, 2012
Roll Call	Safe D	November 4, 2012
Sabato's Crystal Ball	Safe D	November 5, 2012
NY Times	Safe D	November 4, 2012
RCP	Safe D	November 4, 2012
The Hill	Safe D	November 4, 2012

==== Results ====
California's 40th congressional district election, 2012
Party	Candidate	Votes	%
Democratic	Lucille Roybal-Allard (incumbent)	73,940	58.9
Democratic	David Sanchez	51,613	41.1
Total votes		125,553	100.0
Democratic hold			

== District 41 ==
2012 California's 41st congressional district election
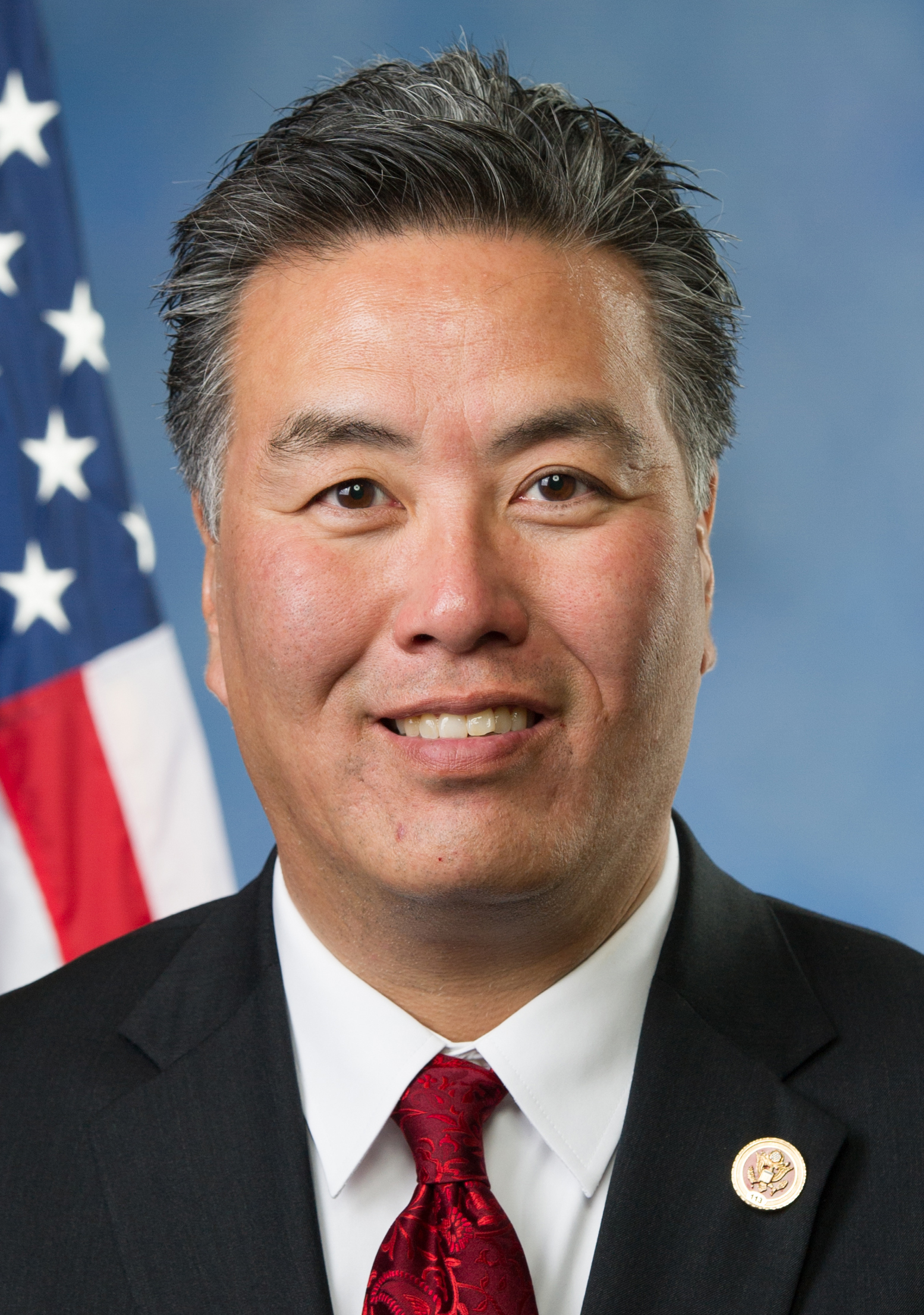

Candidate	Mark Takano	John Tavaglione
Party	Democratic	Republican
Popular vote	103,578	72,074
Percentage	59.0%	41.0%
- County results Takano: 50–60%
U.S. Representative before election
(None)
New district
Elected U.S. Representative
Mark Takano
Democratic

The 41st district is based in the Inland Empire and includes Moreno Valley, Perris, and Riverside. This new district had no incumbent.

=== Primary election ===
==== Democratic candidates ====
===== Advanced to general =====
- Mark Takano, member of the Riverside Community College District Board of Trustees

===== Eliminated in primary =====
- Anna Nevenic, nurse

==== Republican candidates ====
===== Advanced to general =====
- John Tavaglione, Riverside County supervisor

===== Eliminated in primary =====
- George Pearne
- Vince Sawyer, Oath Keeper

===== Declined =====
- Jeff Miller, state assembly member

==== Campaign ====
Takano was endorsed by the California Democratic Party in February 2012. Tavaglione received the endorsement of the California Republican Party in March 2012.

==== Endorsements ====
Mark Takano (D)

Labor unions

- AFL-CIO

==== Results ====
Nonpartisan blanket primary results
Party	Candidate	Votes	%
Republican	John Tavaglione	25,379	44.6
Democratic	Mark Takano	20,860	36.7
Democratic	Anna Nevenic	4,991	8.8
Republican	Vince Sawyer	4,723	8.3
Republican	George Pearne	956	1.7
Total votes		56,909	100.0

=== General election ===
==== Endorsements ====
Mark Takano (D)

Labor unions

- AFL-CIO
- International Brotherhood of Boilermakers
- National Association of Letter Carriers

Organizations

- Democracy for America
- Democratic Congressional Campaign Committee "Red to Blue" Program
- Human Rights Campaign
- Progressive Change Campaign Committee
- Sierra Club
John Tavaglione (R)

Organizations

- National Republican Congressional Committee "Young Guns" Program
- NRA Political Victory Fund
- United States Chamber of Commerce

==== Polling ====
Poll source	Date(s) administered	Sample size	Margin of error	Mark Takano (D)	John Tavaglione (R)	Undecided
EMC Research (D-Takano)	August 8–12, 2012	500 (LV)	± 4.5%	42%	38%	20%

==== Predictions ====
Source	Ranking	As of
The Cook Political Report	Lean D (flip)	November 5, 2012
Rothenberg	Lean D (flip)	November 2, 2012
Roll Call	Lean D (flip)	November 4, 2012
Sabato's Crystal Ball	Lean D (flip)	November 5, 2012
NY Times	Tossup	November 4, 2012
RCP	Lean D (flip)	November 4, 2012
The Hill	Lean D (flip)	November 4, 2012

==== Results ====
California's 41st congressional district election, 2012
Party	Candidate	Votes	%
Democratic	Mark Takano	103,578	59.0
Republican	John Tavaglione	72,074	41.0
Majority		31,504	18.0
Total votes		175,652	100.0
Democratic win (new seat)			

== District 42 ==
2012 California's 42nd congressional district election
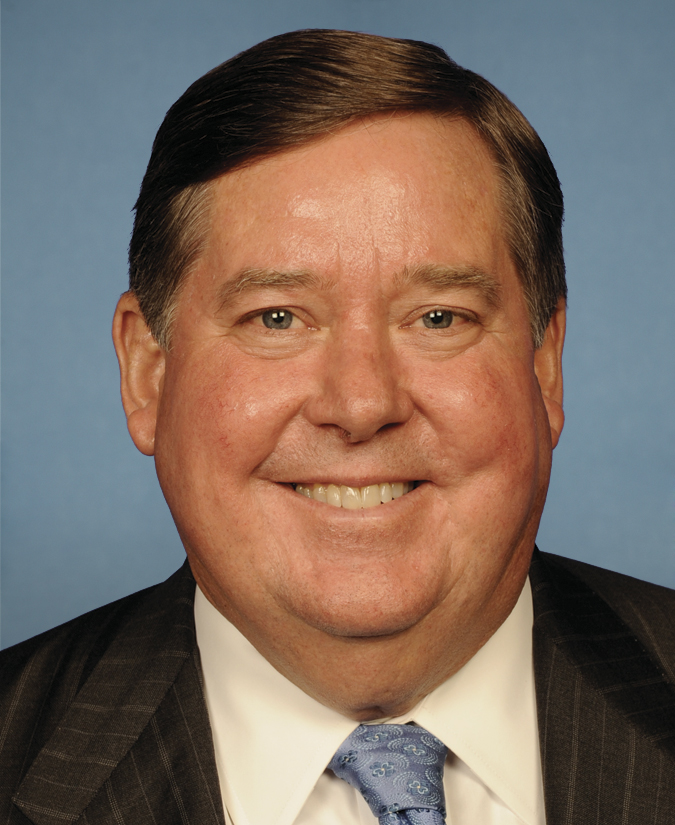

Candidate	Ken Calvert	Michael Williamson
Party	Republican	Democratic
Popular vote	130,245	84,702
Percentage	60.6%	39.4%
- County results Calvert: 60–70%
U.S. Representative before election
Ken Calvert
Republican
Elected U.S. Representative
Ken Calvert
Republican

The 42nd district is based in the Inland Empire and includes Corona and Murrieta. Republican Ken Calvert, who represented the 44th district from 2003 to 2013 and the 43rd district from 1993 to 2003, ran for re-election here.

=== Primary election ===
==== Republican candidates ====
===== Advanced to general =====
- Ken Calvert, incumbent U.S. representative

===== Eliminated in primary =====
- Eva Johnson, former division director, Western Municipal Water District
- Clayton Thibodeau, author and entrepreneur

==== Democratic candidates ====
===== Advanced to general =====
- Michael Williamson, attorney

===== Eliminated in primary =====
- Cliff Smith

==== Campaign ====
Calvert was endorsed by the California Republican Party in March 2012.

==== Endorsements ====
Clayton Thibodeau (R)

Organizations

- Republican Liberty Caucus

==== Results ====
Nonpartisan blanket primary results
Party	Candidate	Votes	%
Republican	Ken Calvert (incumbent)	35,392	51.3
Democratic	Michael Williamson	9,860	14.3
Democratic	Cliff Smith	7,377	10.7
Republican	Clayton Thibodeau	6,374	9.2
Republican	Eva Johnson	5,678	8.2
No party preference	Curt Novak	4,254	6.2
Total votes		68,935	100.0

=== General election ===
==== Endorsements ====
Ken Calvert (R)

Organizations

- National Right to Life Committee
- NRA Political Victory Fund
- United States Chamber of Commerce

==== Predictions ====
Source	Ranking	As of
The Cook Political Report	Safe R	November 5, 2012
Rothenberg	Safe R	November 2, 2012
Roll Call	Safe R	November 4, 2012
Sabato's Crystal Ball	Safe R	November 5, 2012
NY Times	Safe R	November 4, 2012
RCP	Safe R	November 4, 2012
The Hill	Safe R	November 4, 2012

==== Results ====
California's 42nd congressional district election, 2012
Party	Candidate	Votes	%
Republican	Ken Calvert (incumbent)	130,245	60.6
Democratic	Michael Williamson	84,702	39.4
Total votes		214,947	100.0
Republican hold			

== District 43 ==
2012 California's 43rd congressional district election
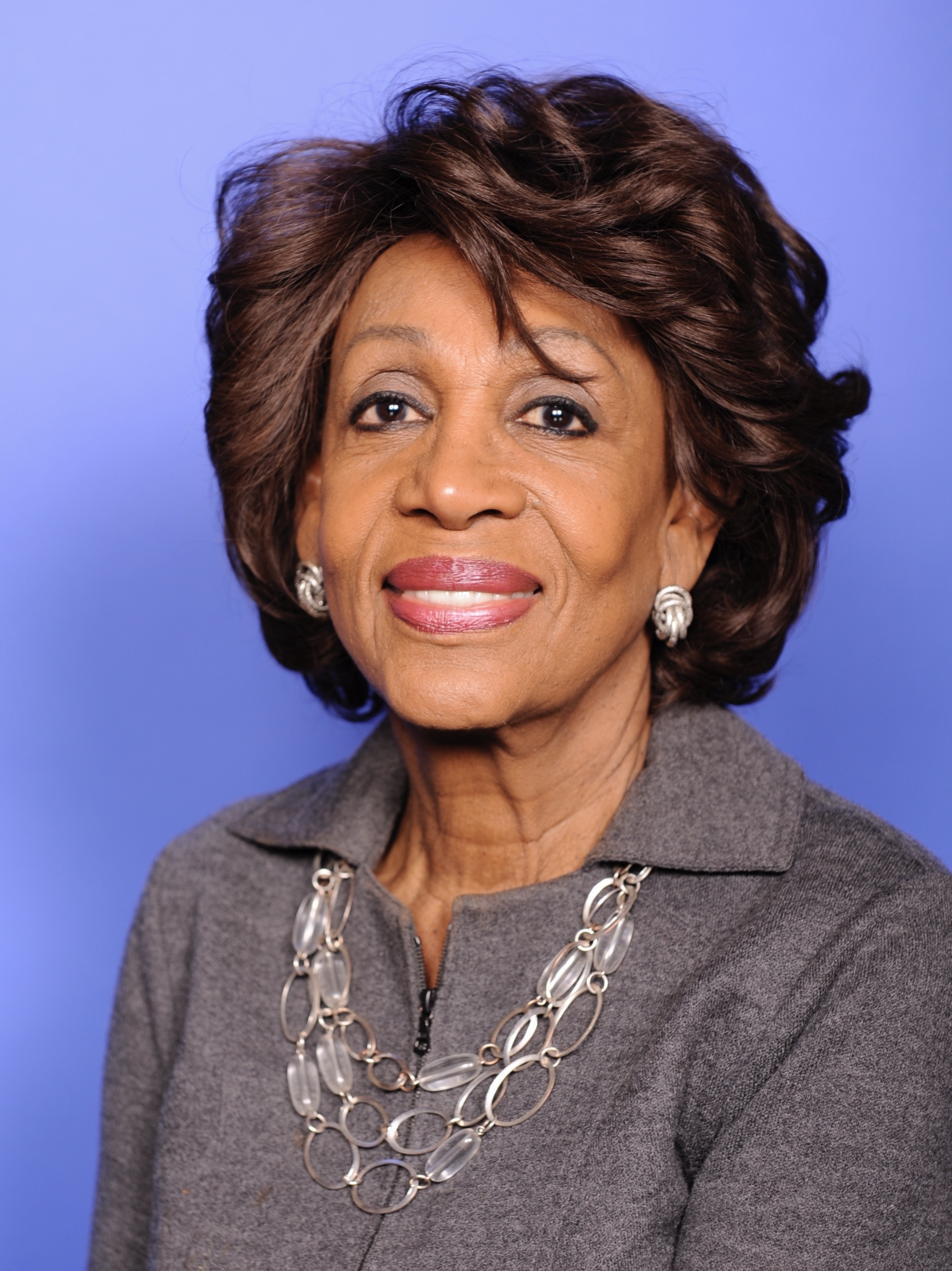

Candidate	Maxine Waters	Bob Flores
Party	Democratic	Democratic
Popular vote	143,123	57,771
Percentage	71.2%	28.8%
U.S. Representative before election
Maxine Waters
Democratic
Elected U.S. Representative
Maxine Waters
Democratic

The 43rd district is based in South Los Angeles and includes Hawthorne and Inglewood. Democrat Maxine Waters, who represented the 35th district from 1993 to 2013 and the 29th district from 1991 to 1993, ran for re-election here.

=== Primary election ===
==== Democratic candidates ====
===== Advanced to general =====
- Bob Flores, self-employed communications manager
- Maxine Waters, incumbent U.S. representative

==== Republican candidates ====
===== Withdrawn =====
- Marco Antonio Leal

==== Campaign ====
Waters received the endorsement of the California Democratic Party in February 2012.

==== Endorsements ====
Maxine Waters (D)

Labor unions

- AFL-CIO

==== Results ====
Nonpartisan blanket primary results
Party	Candidate	Votes	%
Democratic	Maxine Waters (incumbent)	36,062	65.4
Democratic	Bob Flores	19,061	34.6
Total votes		55,123	100.0

=== General election ===
==== Endorsements ====
Maxine Waters (D)

Labor unions

- AFL-CIO
- International Brotherhood of Boilermakers
- National Association of Letter Carriers

Organizations

- Human Rights Campaign
- National Organization for Women
- Sierra Club

==== Predictions ====
Source	Ranking	As of
The Cook Political Report	Safe D	November 5, 2012
Rothenberg	Safe D	November 2, 2012
Roll Call	Safe D	November 4, 2012
Sabato's Crystal Ball	Safe D	November 5, 2012
NY Times	Safe D	November 4, 2012
RCP	Safe D	November 4, 2012
The Hill	Safe D	November 4, 2012

==== Results ====
California's 43rd congressional district election, 2012
Party	Candidate	Votes	%
Democratic	Maxine Waters (incumbent)	143,123	71.2
Democratic	Bob Flores	57,771	28.8
Total votes		200,894	100.0
Democratic hold			

== District 44 ==
2012 California's 44th congressional district election
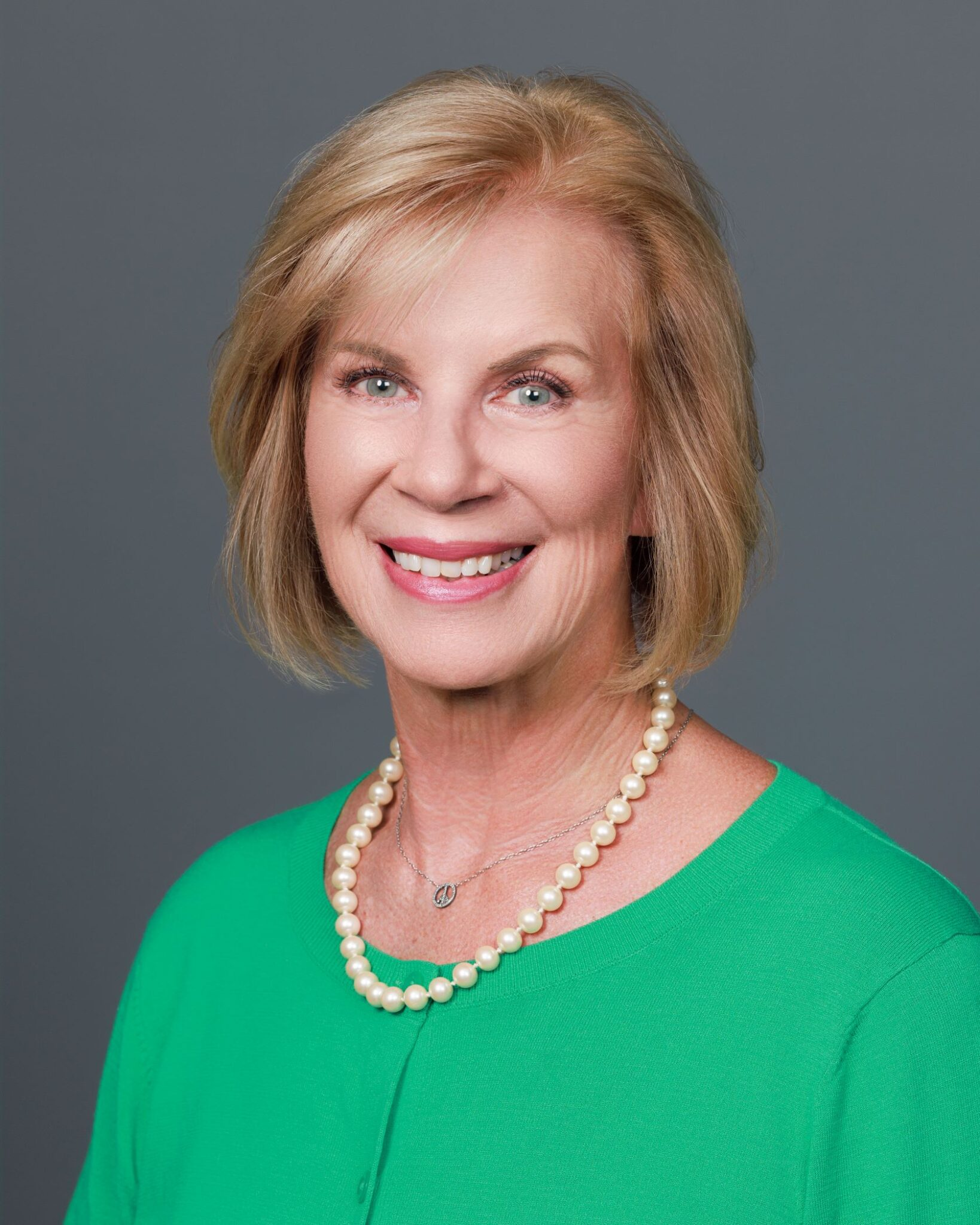

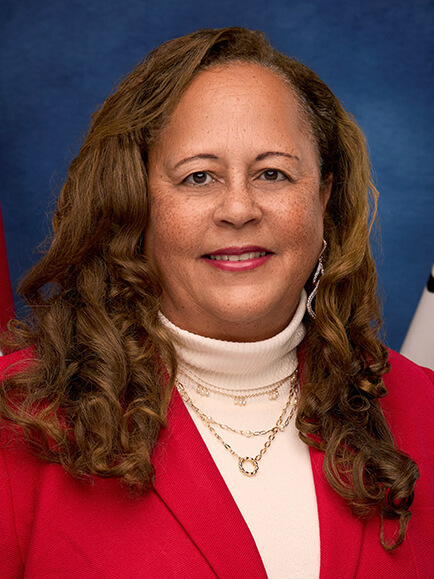
Nominee	Janice Hahn	Laura Richardson
Party	Democratic	Democratic
Popular vote	99,909	65,989
Percentage	60.2%	39.8%
U.S. Representative before election
Janice Hahn
Democratic
Elected U.S. Representative
Janice Hahn
Democratic

The 44th district is based in south Los Angeles County and includes Carson, Compton, and San Pedro. Democrat Janice Hahn, who represented the 36th district from 2011 to 2013, ran for re-election against fellow Democrat Laura Richardson, who represented the 37th district from 2007 to 2013.

=== Primary election ===
==== Democratic candidates ====
===== Advanced to general =====
- Janice Hahn, incumbent U.S. representative for the 36th district
- Laura Richardson, incumbent U.S. representative for the 37th district

===== Declined =====
- Isadore Hall, state assembly member

==== Republican candidates ====
===== Withdrawn =====
- John Lauro

==== Campaign ====
In February 2012, Hahn became the officially endorsed candidate of the California Democratic Party.

==== Endorsements ====
Janice Hahn (D)

Labor unions

- AFL-CIO

==== Results ====
Nonpartisan blanket primary results
Party	Candidate	Votes	%
Democratic	Janice Hahn (incumbent)	24,843	60.1
Democratic	Laura Richardson (incumbent)	16,523	39.9
Total votes		41,366	100.0

=== General election ===
==== Endorsements ====
Janice Hahn (D)

Labor unions

- AFL-CIO
- International Brotherhood of Boilermakers

Organizations

- National Organization for Women
- Sierra Club

==== Polling ====
Poll source	Date(s) administered	Sample size	Margin of error	Janice Hahn (D)	Laura Richardson (D)	Undecided
Fairbank, Maslin, Maullin, Metz & Associates (D-Hahn)	September 26–29, 2012	350 (LV)	± 5.3%	42%	27%	30%
SurveyUSA	September 20–23, 2012	613 (LV)	± 4.0%	43%	33%	24%

==== Predictions ====
Source	Ranking	As of
The Cook Political Report	Safe D	November 5, 2012
Rothenberg	Safe D	November 2, 2012
Roll Call	Safe D	November 4, 2012
Sabato's Crystal Ball	Safe D	November 5, 2012
NY Times	Safe D	November 4, 2012
RCP	Safe D	November 4, 2012
The Hill	Safe D	November 4, 2012

==== Results ====
California's 44th congressional district primary election, 2012
Party	Candidate	Votes	%
Democratic	Janice Hahn (incumbent)	99,909	60.2
Democratic	Laura Richardson (incumbent)	65,989	39.8
Total votes		165,898	100.0
Democratic hold			

==== Results ====
General election results
Party	Candidate	Votes	%
Democratic	Janice Hahn (incumbent)	99,909	60.2
Democratic	Laura Richardson (incumbent)	65,989	39.8
Total votes		165,898	100.0
Democratic hold			

== District 45 ==
2012 California's 45th congressional district election
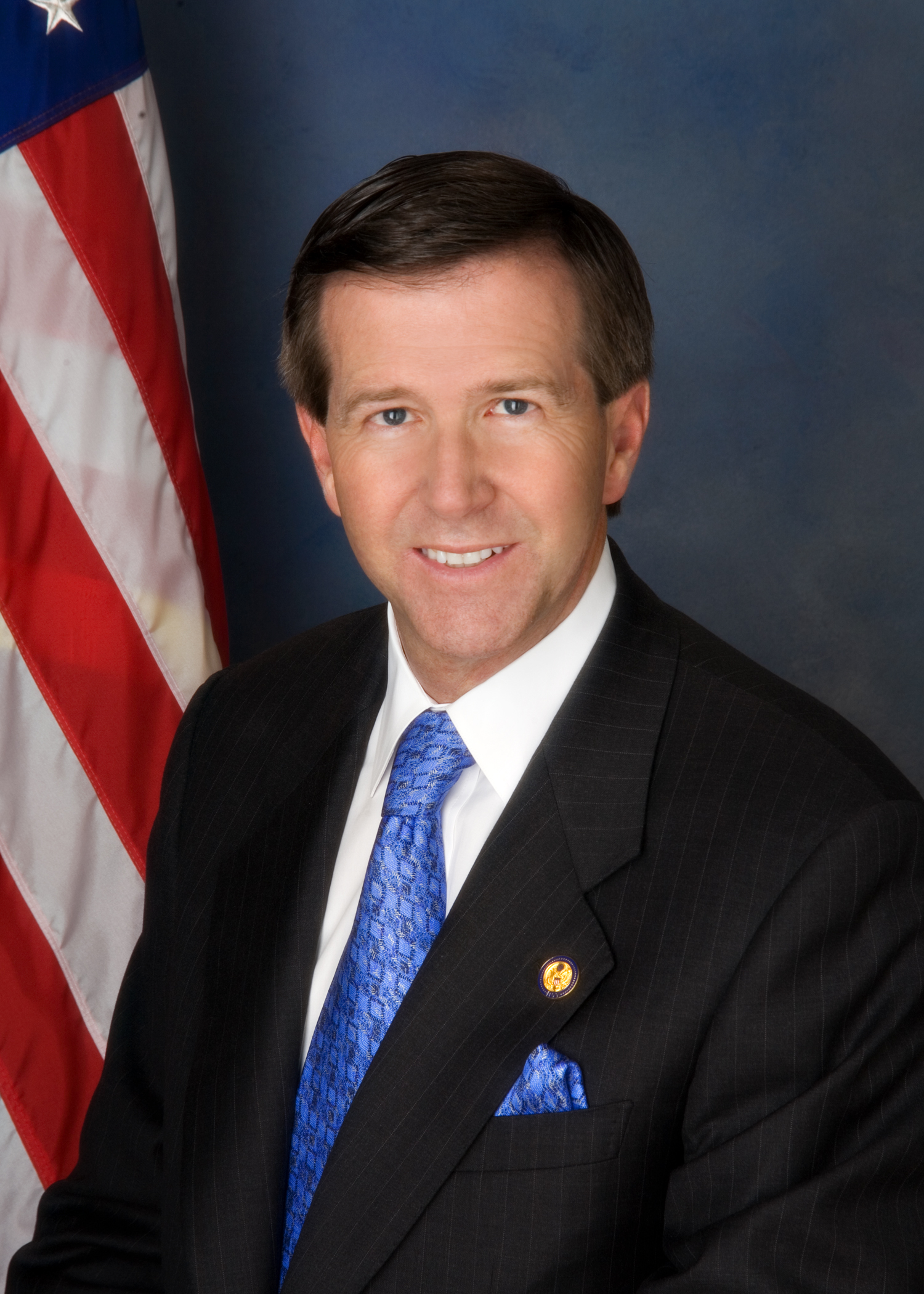

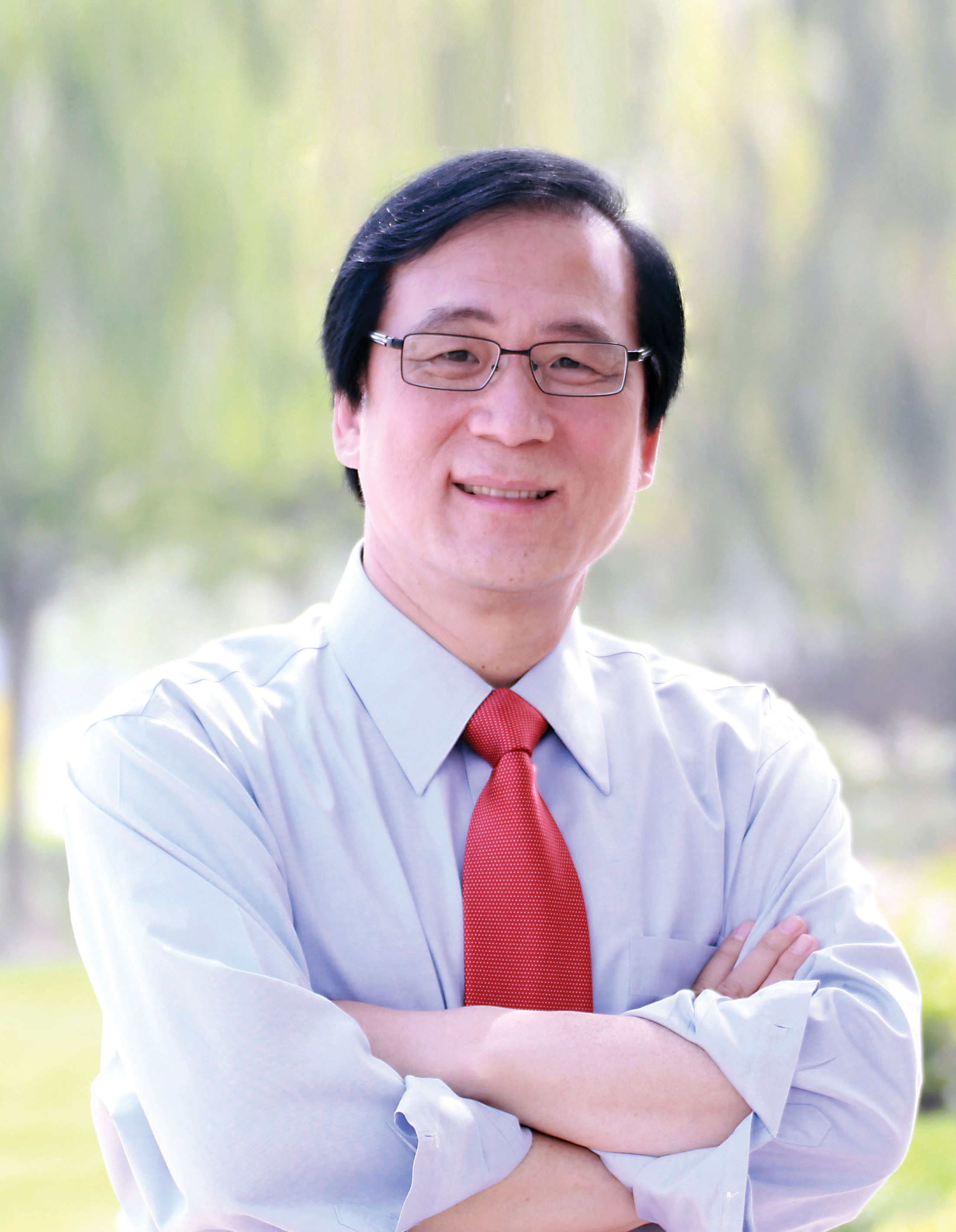
Candidate	John Campbell	Sukhee Kang
Party	Republican	Democratic
Popular vote	171,417	121,814
Percentage	58.5%	41.5%
- County results Campbell: 50–60%
U.S. Representative before election
John Campbell
Republican
Elected U.S. Representative
John Campbell
Republican

The 45th district is based in inland Orange County and includes Irvine and Mission Viejo. Republican John Campbell, who represented the 48th district from 2005 to 2013, ran for re-election here.

=== Primary election ===
==== Republican candidates ====
===== Advanced to general =====
- John Campbell, incumbent U.S. representative

===== Eliminated in primary =====
- John Webb, small businessman

==== Democratic candidates ====
===== Advanced to general =====
- Sukhee Kang, mayor of Irvine

==== Campaign ====
Kang was endorsed by the California Democratic Party in February 2012. Campbell received the endorsement of the California Republican Party in March 2012.

==== Endorsements ====
Sukhee Kang (D)

Labor unions

- AFL-CIO

==== Results ====
Nonpartisan blanket primary results
Party	Candidate	Votes	%
Republican	John Campbell (incumbent)	54,346	51.0
Democratic	Sukhee Kang	35,182	33.0
Republican	John Webb	17,014	16.0
Total votes		106,542	100.0

=== General election ===
==== Endorsements ====
John Campbell (R)

Organizations

- National Right to Life Committee
- NRA Political Victory Fund
- United States Chamber of Commerce
Sukhee Kang (D)

Labor unions

- AFL-CIO
- International Brotherhood of Boilermakers

Organizations

- Sierra Club

==== Predictions ====
Source	Ranking	As of
The Cook Political Report	Safe R	November 5, 2012
Rothenberg	Safe R	November 2, 2012
Roll Call	Safe R	November 4, 2012
Sabato's Crystal Ball	Safe R	November 5, 2012
NY Times	Safe R	November 4, 2012
RCP	Safe R	November 4, 2012
The Hill	Safe R	November 4, 2012

==== Results ====
California's 45th congressional district election, 2012
Party	Candidate	Votes	%
Republican	John Campbell (incumbent)	171,417	58.5
Democratic	Sukhee Kang	121,814	41.5
Majority		49,603	17.0
Total votes		293,231	100.0
Republican hold			

== District 46 ==
2012 California's 46th congressional district election
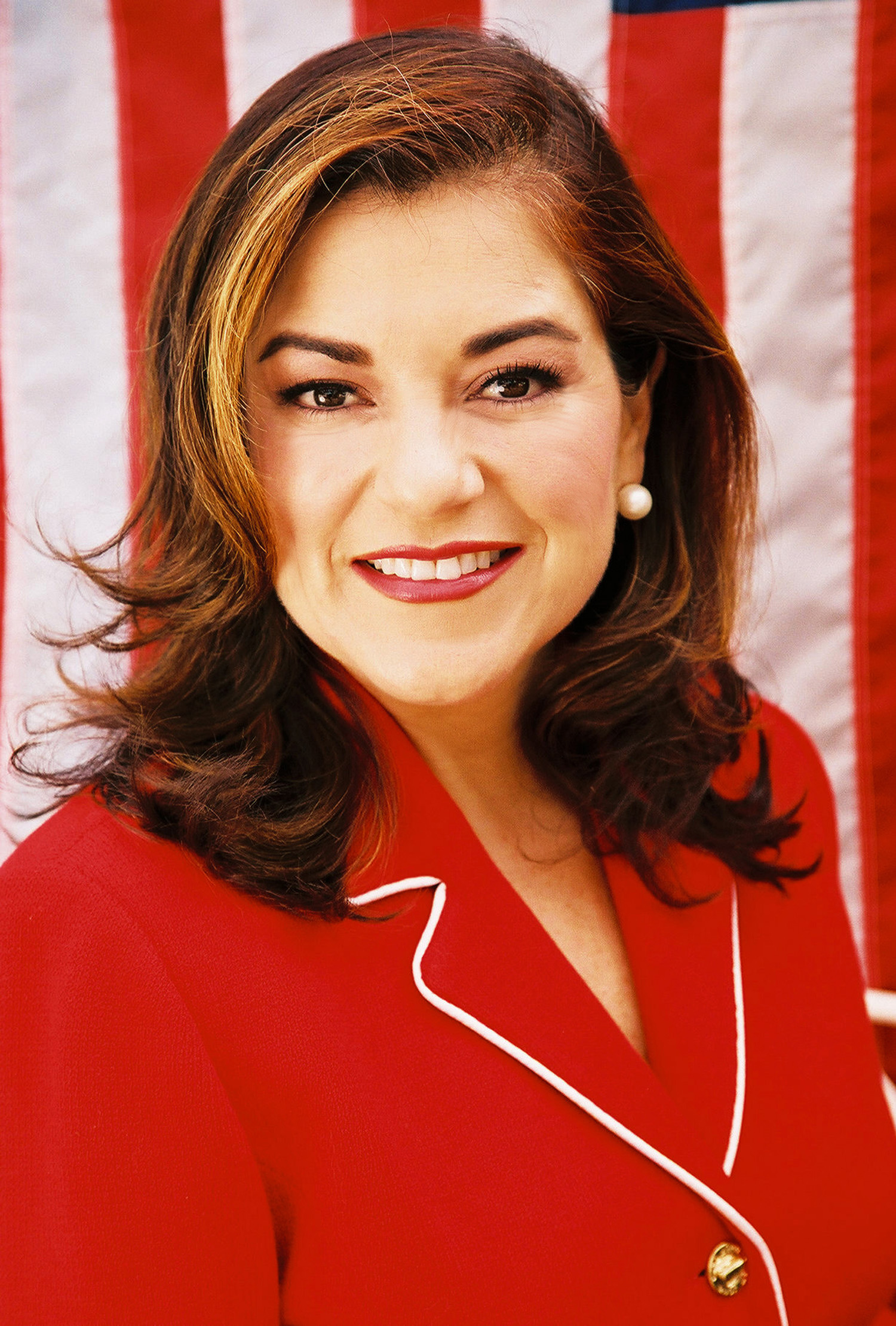

Candidate	Loretta Sanchez	Jerry Hayden
Party	Democratic	Republican
Popular vote	95,694	54,121
Percentage	63.9%	36.1%
- County results Sanchez: 60–70%
U.S. Representative before election
Loretta Sanchez
Democratic
Elected U.S. Representative
Loretta Sanchez
Democratic

The 46th district is based in central Orange County and includes Anaheim and Santa Ana. Democrat Loretta Sanchez, who represented the 47th district from 2003 to 2013 and the 46th district from 1997 to 2003, ran for re-election here.

=== Primary election ===
==== Democratic candidates ====
===== Advanced to general =====
- Loretta Sanchez, incumbent U.S. representative

==== Republican candidates ====
===== Advanced to general =====
- Jerry Hayden, independent businessman

===== Eliminated in primary =====
- John H. Cullum, accountant
- Pat Garcia, escrow company owner

==== Independent candidates ====
===== Eliminated in primary =====
- Jorge Rocha, tax accountant

==== Campaign ====
Sanchez received the endorsement of the California Democratic Party in February 2012. Hayden was endorsed by the California Republican Party in March 2012.

==== Endorsements ====
Loretta Sanchez (D)

Labor unions

- AFL-CIO

Organizations

- Blue Dog Coalition
- National Organization for Women
- Sierra Club

==== Results ====
California's 46th congressional district election, 2012
Primary election
Party	Candidate	Votes	%
Democratic	Loretta Sanchez (incumbent)	25,706	52.1
Republican	Jerry Hayden	14,571	29.5
Republican	John J. Cullum	5,251	10.6
No party preference	Jorge Rocha	1,969	4.0
Republican	Pat Garcia	1,852	3.8
Total votes		49,349	100.0

=== General election ===
==== Endorsements ====
Loretta Sanchez (D)

Labor unions

- AFL-CIO
- International Brotherhood of Boilermakers
- National Association of Letter Carriers

Organizations

- Blue Dog Coalition
- Human Rights Campaign
- National Organization for Women

==== Predictions ====
Source	Ranking	As of
The Cook Political Report	Safe D	November 5, 2012
Rothenberg	Safe D	November 2, 2012
Roll Call	Safe D	November 4, 2012
Sabato's Crystal Ball	Safe D	November 5, 2012
NY Times	Safe D	November 4, 2012
RCP	Safe D	November 4, 2012
The Hill	Safe D	November 4, 2012

==== Results ====
California's 46th congressional district election, 2012
Party	Candidate	Votes	%
Democratic	Loretta Sanchez (incumbent)	95,694	63.9
Republican	Jerry Hayden	54,121	36.1
Total votes		149,815	100.0
Democratic hold			

== District 47 ==
2012 California's 47th congressional district election
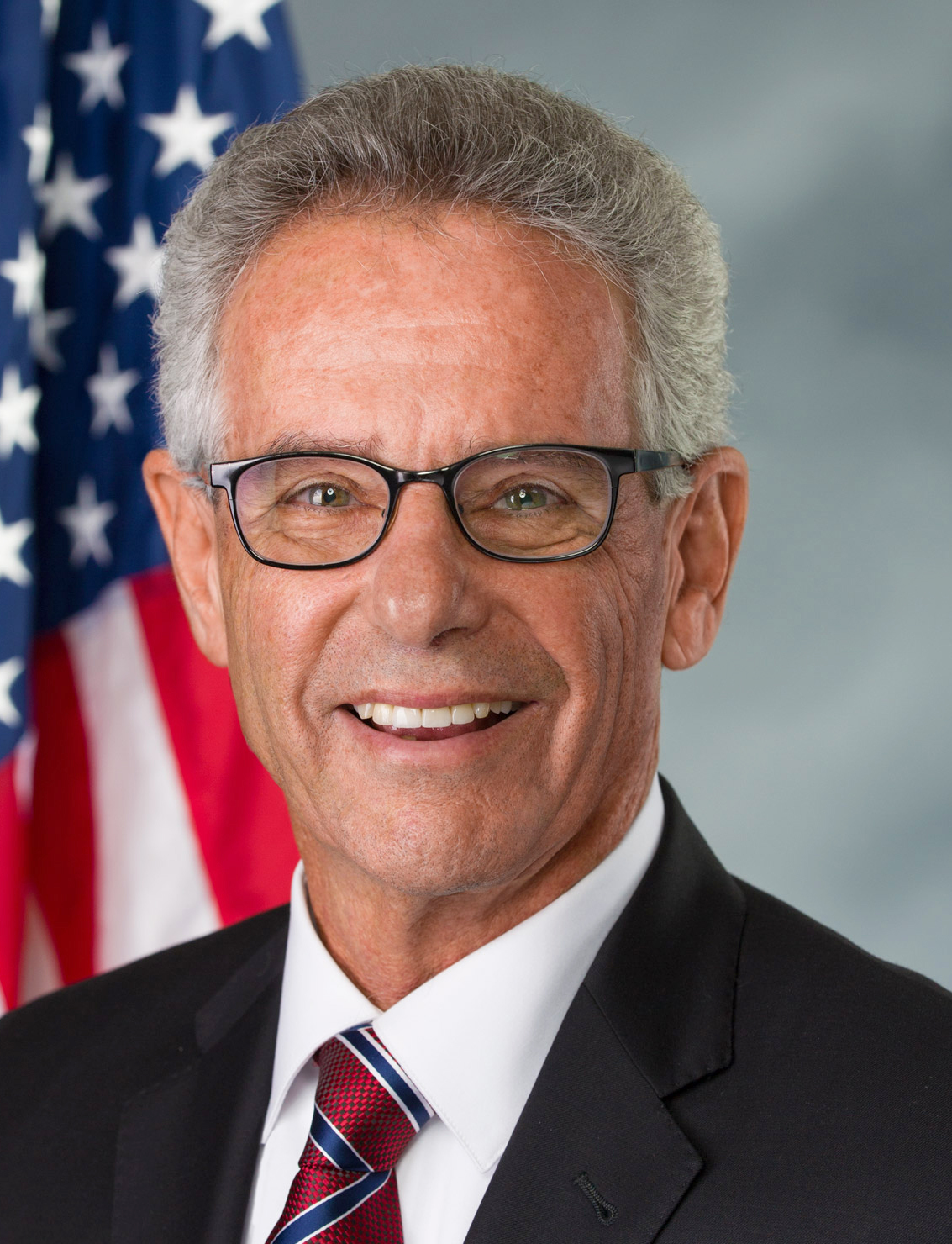

Candidate	Alan Lowenthal	Gary DeLong
Party	Democratic	Republican
Popular vote	130,093	99,919
Percentage	56.6%	43.4%
- County results Lowenthal: 60–70% Delong: 50–60%
U.S. Representative before election
(None)
New district
Elected U.S. Representative
Alan Lowenthal
Democratic

The 47th district includes Long Beach and parts of Orange County. This new district had no incumbent.

=== Primary election ===
==== Democratic candidates ====
===== Advanced to general =====
- Alan Lowenthal, state senator

===== Eliminated in primary =====
- Peter Mathews, professor
- Jay Shah
- Usha Shah

===== Declined =====
- Joe Dunn, former state senator
- Linda Sánchez, incumbent U.S. representative

==== Republican candidates ====
===== Advanced to general =====
- Gary DeLong, Long Beach City Council member

===== Eliminated in primary =====
- Steve Foley, conservative blogger, activist and campaign consultant
- Steven T. Kuykendall, former U.S. representative

===== Declined =====
- Troy Edgar, mayor of Los Alamitos and former member of the Los Alamitos City Council

==== Campaign ====
Lowenthal was endorsed by the California Democratic Party in February 2012. Delong received the endorsement of the California Republican Party in March 2012.

==== Endorsements ====
Alan Lowenthal (D)

Labor unions

- AFL-CIO

==== Results ====
Nonpartisan blanket primary results
Party	Candidate	Votes	%
Democratic	Alan Lowenthal	27,356	33.8
Republican	Gary DeLong	23,831	29.4
Republican	Steven T. Kuykendall	8,769	10.8
Democratic	Peter Mathews	7,951	9.8
Republican	Steve Foley	5,848	7.2
Republican	Sanford W. Kahn	2,563	3.2
Democratic	Usha Shah	2,350	2.9
Democratic	Jay Shah	2,273	2.8
Total votes		80,941	100.0

=== General election ===
==== Endorsements ====
Alan Lowenthal (D)

Labor unions

- AFL-CIO
- International Brotherhood of Boilermakers
- National Association of Letter Carriers

Organizations

- Democratic Congressional Campaign Committee "Red to Blue" Program
- Human Rights Campaign
- National Organization for Women
- Sierra Club
Gary DeLong (R)

Organizations

- GOProud
- National Republican Congressional Committee "Young Guns" Program
- NRA Political Victory Fund
- United States Chamber of Commerce

==== Polling ====
Poll source	Date(s) administered	Sample size	Margin of error	Alan Lowenthal (D)	Gary DeLong (R)	Undecided
Goodwin Simon Strategic Research	August 16–18, 2012	400 (LV)	± 5.0%	51%	31%	18%
DCCC (D)	July 18, 2012	379 (LV)	± 5.0%	47%	36%	17%
Probolsky Research (R-DeLong)	June 28–July 3, 2012	400 (LV)	± 4.9%	44%	41%	15%

==== Predictions ====
Source	Ranking	As of
The Cook Political Report	Likely D	November 5, 2012
Rothenberg	Likely D	November 2, 2012
Roll Call	Safe D	November 4, 2012
Sabato's Crystal Ball	Likely D	November 5, 2012
NY Times	Lean D	November 4, 2012
RCP	Likely D	November 4, 2012
The Hill	Likely D	November 4, 2012

==== Results ====
California's 47th congressional district election, 2012
Party	Candidate	Votes	%
Democratic	Alan Lowenthal	130,093	56.6
Republican	Gary DeLong	99,919	43.4
Majority		30,174	13.2
Total votes		230,012	100.0
Democratic win (new seat)			

== District 48 ==
2012 California's 48th congressional district election
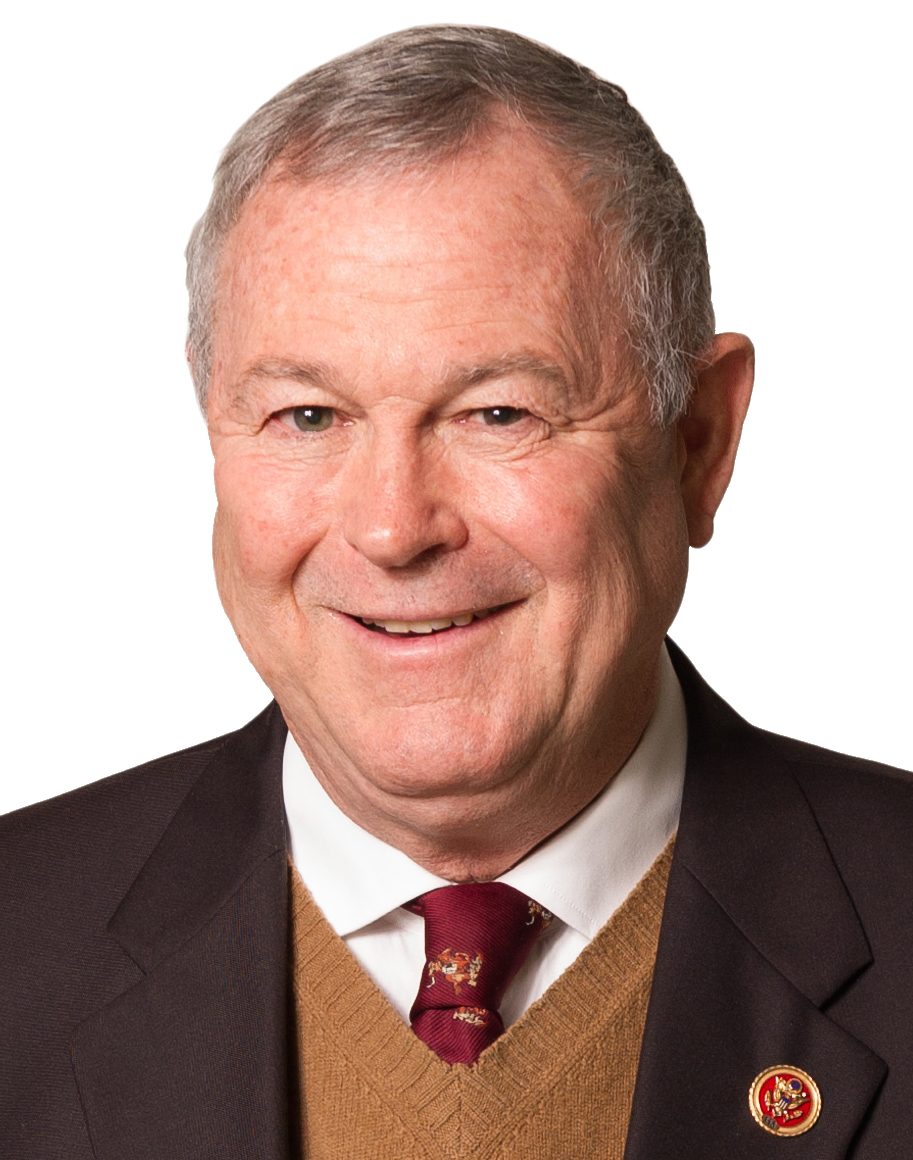

Candidate	Dana Rohrabacher	Ron Varasteh
Party	Republican	Democratic
Popular vote	177,144	113,358
Percentage	61.0%	39.0%
- County results Rohrabacher: 60–70%
U.S. Representative before election
Dana Rohrabacher
Republican
Elected U.S. Representative
Dana Rohrabacher
Republican

The 48th district is based in coastal Orange County and includes Huntington Beach. Republican Dana Rohrabacher, who represented the 46th district from 2003 to 2013 and the 42nd and 45th districts from 1989 to 1993 and 1993 to 2003 respectively, ran for re-election here.

=== Primary election ===
==== Republican candidates ====
===== Advanced to general =====
- Dana Rohrabacher, incumbent U.S. representative

==== Democratic candidates ====
===== Advanced to general =====
- Ron Varasteh, scientist and engineer

==== Independent candidates ====
===== Eliminated in primary =====
- Alan Schlar, marketing executive

==== Campaign ====
Rohrabacher was endorsed by the California Republican Party in March 2012.

==== Results ====
Nonpartisan blanket primary results
Party	Candidate	Votes	%
Republican	Dana Rohrabacher (incumbent)	73,302	66.3
Democratic	Ron Varasteh	31,912	28.9
No party preference	Alan Schlar	5,355	4.8
Total votes		110,569	100.0

=== General election ===
==== Endorsements ====
Dana Rohrabacher (R)

Organizations

- National Right to Life Committee
- NRA Political Victory Fund
- United States Chamber of Commerce

==== Predictions ====
Source	Ranking	As of
The Cook Political Report	Safe R	November 5, 2012
Rothenberg	Safe R	November 2, 2012
Roll Call	Safe R	November 4, 2012
Sabato's Crystal Ball	Safe R	November 5, 2012
NY Times	Safe R	November 4, 2012
RCP	Safe R	November 4, 2012
The Hill	Safe R	November 4, 2012

==== Results ====
California's 48th congressional district election, 2012
Party	Candidate	Votes	%
Republican	Dana Rohrabacher (incumbent)	177,144	61.0
Democratic	Ron Varasteh	113,358	39.0
Total votes		290,502	100.0
Republican hold			

== District 49 ==
2012 California's 49th congressional district election
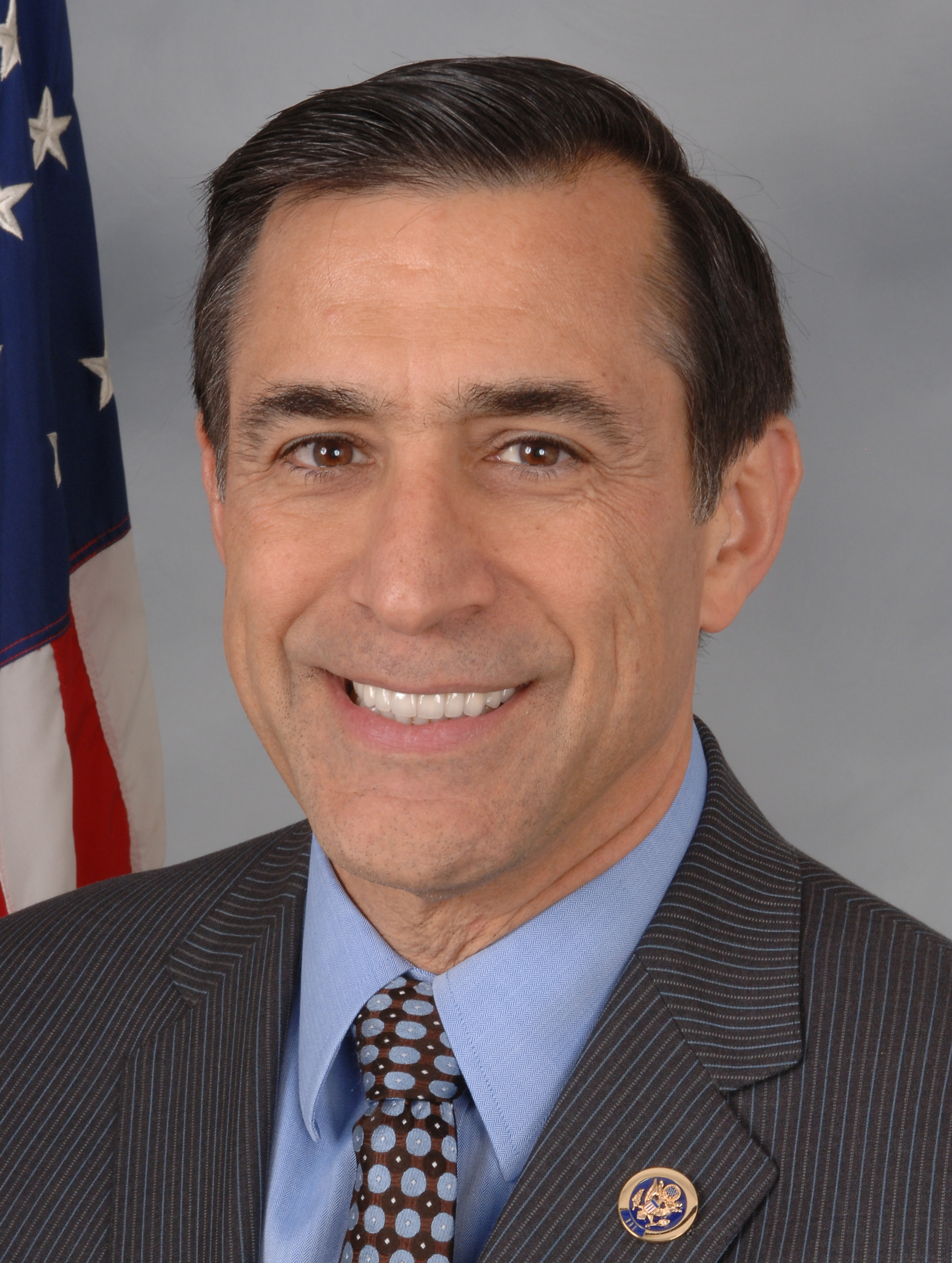

Candidate	Darrell Issa	Jerry Tetalman
Party	Republican	Democratic
Popular vote	159,725	114,893
Percentage	58.2%	41.8%
- County results Issa: 50–60% 60–70%
U.S. Representative before election
Darrell Issa
Republican
Elected U.S. Representative
Darrell Issa
Republican

The 49th district is based in northern San Diego County and includes Carlsbad and Oceanside. Republican Darrell Issa, who had represented the 49th district since 2003 and the 48th district from 2001 to 2003, ran for re-election.

=== Primary election ===
==== Republican candidates ====
===== Advanced to general =====
- Darrell Issa, incumbent U.S. representative

==== Democratic candidates ====
===== Advanced to general =====
- Jerry Tetalman, realtor

==== Independent candidates ====
===== Eliminated in primary =====
- Dick Eiden, retired attorney and poet
- Albin Novinec, U.S. Marine

==== Campaign ====
Tetalman received the endorsement of the California Democratic Party in February 2012. Issa was endorsed by the California Republican Party in March 2012.

==== Endorsements ====
Jerry Tetalman (D)

Labor unions

- AFL-CIO

==== Results ====
Nonpartisan blanket primary results
Party	Candidate	Votes	%
Republican	Darrell Issa (incumbent)	71,329	61.1
Democratic	Jerry Tetalman	35,816	30.7
No party preference	Dick Eiden	7,988	6.8
No party preference	Albin Novinec	1,626	1.4
Total votes		116,759	100.0

=== General election ===
==== Endorsements ====
Darrell Issa (R)

Organizations

- National Right to Life Committee
- NRA Political Victory Fund
- United States Chamber of Commerce
Jerry Tetalman (D)

Labor unions

- AFL-CIO
- International Brotherhood of Boilermakers

==== Predictions ====
Source	Ranking	As of
The Cook Political Report	Safe R	November 5, 2012
Rothenberg	Safe R	November 2, 2012
Roll Call	Safe R	November 4, 2012
Sabato's Crystal Ball	Safe R	November 5, 2012
NY Times	Safe R	November 4, 2012
RCP	Safe R	November 4, 2012
The Hill	Safe R	November 4, 2012

==== Results ====
California's 49th congressional district election, 2012
Party	Candidate	Votes	%
Republican	Darrell Issa (incumbent)	159,725	58.2
Democratic	Jerry Tetalman	114,893	41.8
Majority		44,832	16.4
Total votes		274,618	100.0
Republican hold			

== District 50 ==
2012 California's 50th congressional district election
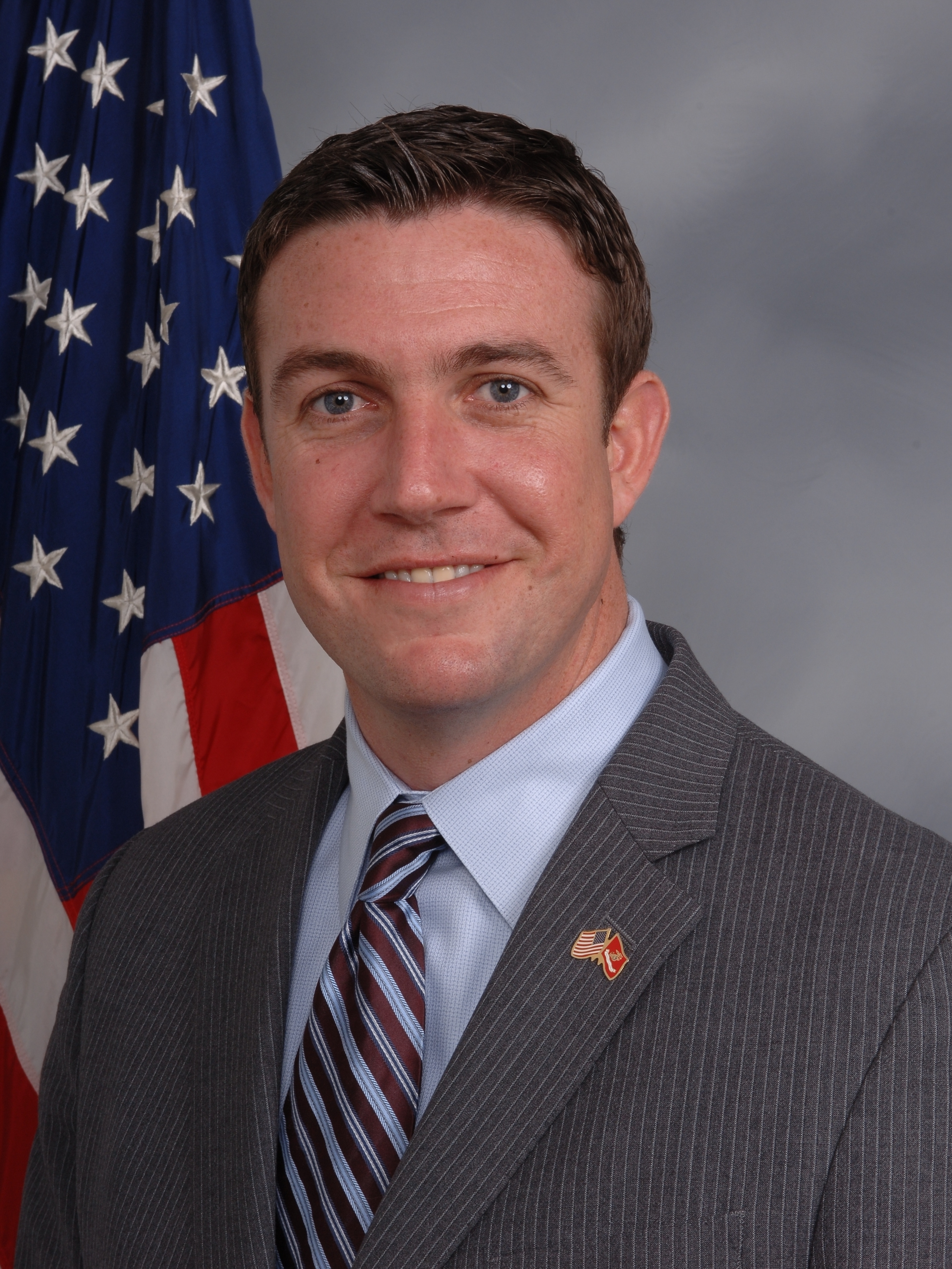

Candidate	Duncan D. Hunter	David B. Secor
Party	Republican	Democratic
Popular vote	174,838	83,455
Percentage	67.7%	32.3%
- County results Hunter: 60–70%
U.S. Representative before election
Duncan D. Hunter
Republican
Elected U.S. Representative
Duncan D. Hunter
Republican

The 50th district is based in inland San Diego County and includes Escondido and Santee. Republican Duncan D. Hunter, who represented the 52nd district from 2009 to 2013, ran for re-election here.

=== Primary election ===
==== Republican candidates ====
===== Advanced to general =====
- Duncan D. Hunter, incumbent U.S. representative

===== Eliminated in primary =====
- Terri Linnell, Tea Party activist and candidate for this seat in 2010

==== Democratic candidates ====
===== Advanced to general =====
- David Secor, retired clerk of the San Diego Superior Court

===== Eliminated in primary =====
- Connie Frankowiak, community activist and candidate for this seat in 2006 & 2010

==== Campaign ====
Hunter received the endorsement of the California Republican Party in March 2012.

==== Results ====
Nonpartisan blanket primary results
Party	Candidate	Votes	%
Republican	Duncan D. Hunter (incumbent)	76,818	67.4
Democratic	David B. Secor	19,142	16.8
Democratic	Connie Frankowiak	8,553	7.5
Libertarian	Michael Benoit	6,160	5.4
Republican	Terri Linnell	3,275	2.9
Total votes		113,948	100.0

=== General election ===
==== Endorsements ====
Duncan D. Hunter (R)

Labor unions

- International Brotherhood of Boilermakers

Organizations

- Campaign for Working Families
- National Right to Life Committee
- NRA Political Victory Fund
- United States Chamber of Commerce

==== Predictions ====
Source	Ranking	As of
The Cook Political Report	Safe R	November 5, 2012
Rothenberg	Safe R	November 2, 2012
Roll Call	Safe R	November 4, 2012
Sabato's Crystal Ball	Safe R	November 5, 2012
NY Times	Safe R	November 4, 2012
RCP	Safe R	November 4, 2012
The Hill	Safe R	November 4, 2012

==== Results ====
California's 50th congressional district election, 2012
Party	Candidate	Votes	%
Republican	Duncan D. Hunter (incumbent)	174,838	67.7
Democratic	David B. Secor	83,455	32.3
Total votes		258,293	100.0
Republican hold			

== District 51 ==
2012 California's 51st congressional district election
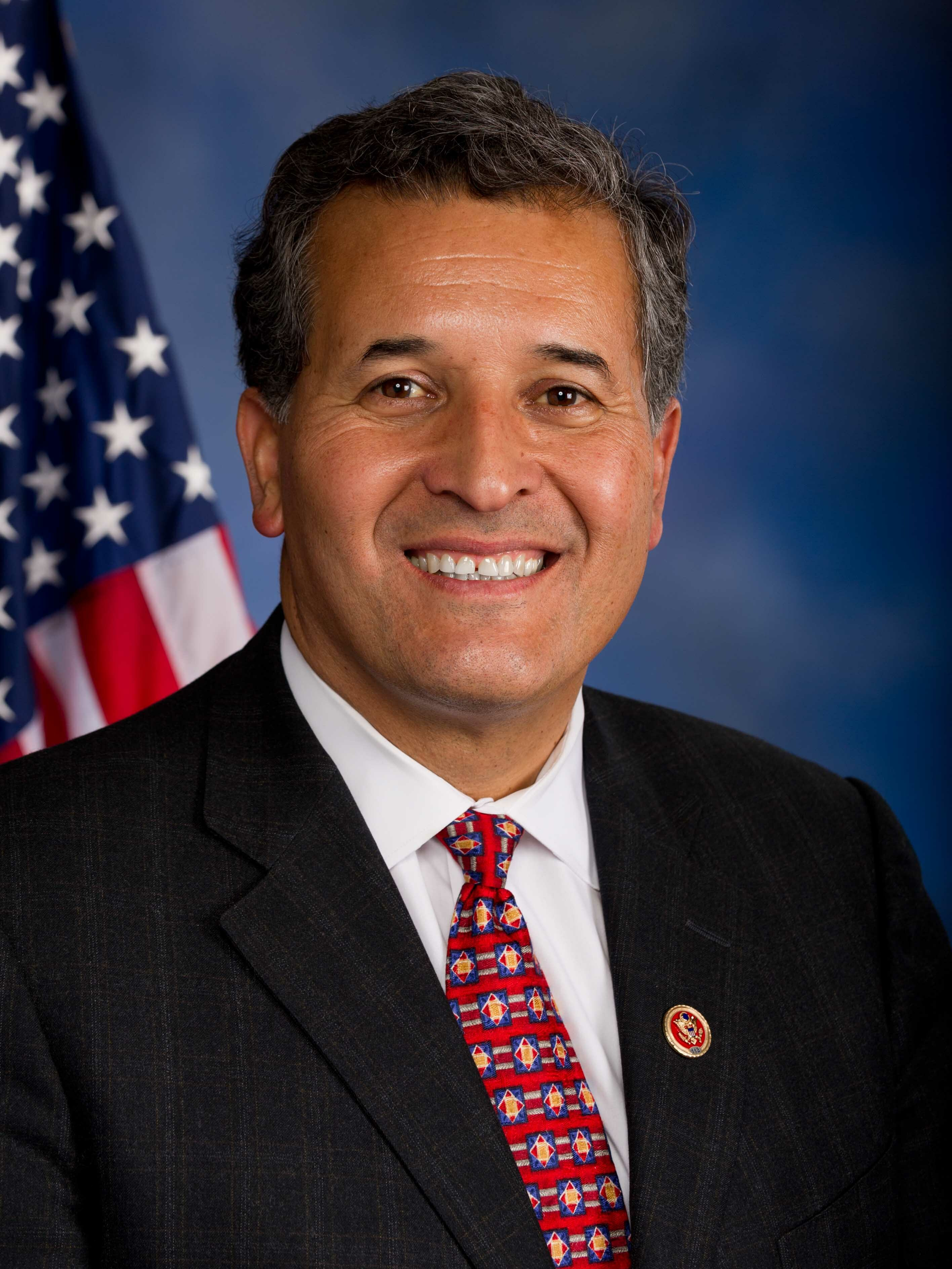

Candidate	Juan Vargas	Michael Crimmins
Party	Democratic	Republican
Popular vote	113,934	45,464
Percentage	71.5%	28.5%
- County results Vargas: 60–70% 70–80%
U.S. Representative before election
Bob Filner
Democratic
Elected U.S. Representative
Juan Vargas
Democratic

The new 51st district runs along the border with Mexico and includes Imperial County and San Diego. Democrat Bob Filner, who represented the 51st district from 2003 to 2013 and the 50th district from 1993 until 2003, retired to run for mayor of San Diego.

=== Primary election ===
==== Democratic candidates ====
===== Advanced to general =====
- Juan Vargas, state senator and candidate for this seat in 1992, 1996 & 2006

===== Eliminated in primary =====
- John Brooks, writer and retired federal employee
- Denise Moreno Ducheny, state senator
- Daniel Ramirez

===== Declined =====
- Bob Filner, incumbent U.S. representative

==== Republican candidates ====
===== Advanced to general =====
- Michael Crimmins, high school principal, retired Marine Corps major and nominee for 53rd district in 2008 & 2010

===== Eliminated in primary =====
- Xanthi Gionis, businesswoman and author
- Bernard Portley, computer scientist

==== Campaign ====
Vargas was endorsed by the California Democratic Party in February 2012. Gionis received the endorsement of the California Republican Party in March 2012.

Vargas was predicted to face fellow Democratic state senator Denise Moreno Ducheny in the general election, but he spent some of his funds on mailers to help Republican Michael Crimmins, who he preferred to face in the general election in this heavily Democratic seat. Vargas spent $40–50,000 helping Crimmins, at least eight times more than Crimmins spent himself. The effort was successful as Crimmins finished 2,909 votes ahead of Ducheny.

==== Endorsements ====
Juan Vargas (D)

Labor unions

- AFL-CIO

==== Results ====
Nonpartisan blanket primary results
Party	Candidate	Votes	%
Democratic	Juan Vargas	30,143	46.0
Republican	Michael Crimmins	13,016	19.9
Democratic	Denise Moreno Ducheny	10,107	15.4
Republican	Xanthi Gionis	4,487	6.8
Democratic	John Brooks	3,290	5.0
Democratic	Daniel C. "Danny" Ramirez	2,794	4.3
Republican	Bernard Portley	1,667	2.5
Total votes		65,504	100.0

=== General election ===
==== Endorsements ====
Juan Vargas (D)

Labor unions

- AFL-CIO
- International Brotherhood of Boilermakers
- National Association of Letter Carriers

Organizations

- Democratic Congressional Campaign Committee "Majority Makers" Program

==== Predictions ====
Source	Ranking	As of
The Cook Political Report	Safe D	November 5, 2012
Rothenberg	Safe D	November 2, 2012
Roll Call	Safe D	November 4, 2012
Sabato's Crystal Ball	Safe D	November 5, 2012
NY Times	Safe D	November 4, 2012
RCP	Safe D	November 4, 2012
The Hill	Safe D	November 4, 2012

==== Results ====
Vargas won the general election in a landslide.

California's 51st congressional district election, 2012
Party	Candidate	Votes	%
Democratic	Juan Vargas	113,934	71.5
Republican	Michael Crimmins	45,464	28.5
Total votes		159,398	100.0
Democratic hold			

== District 52 ==
2012 California's 52nd congressional district election
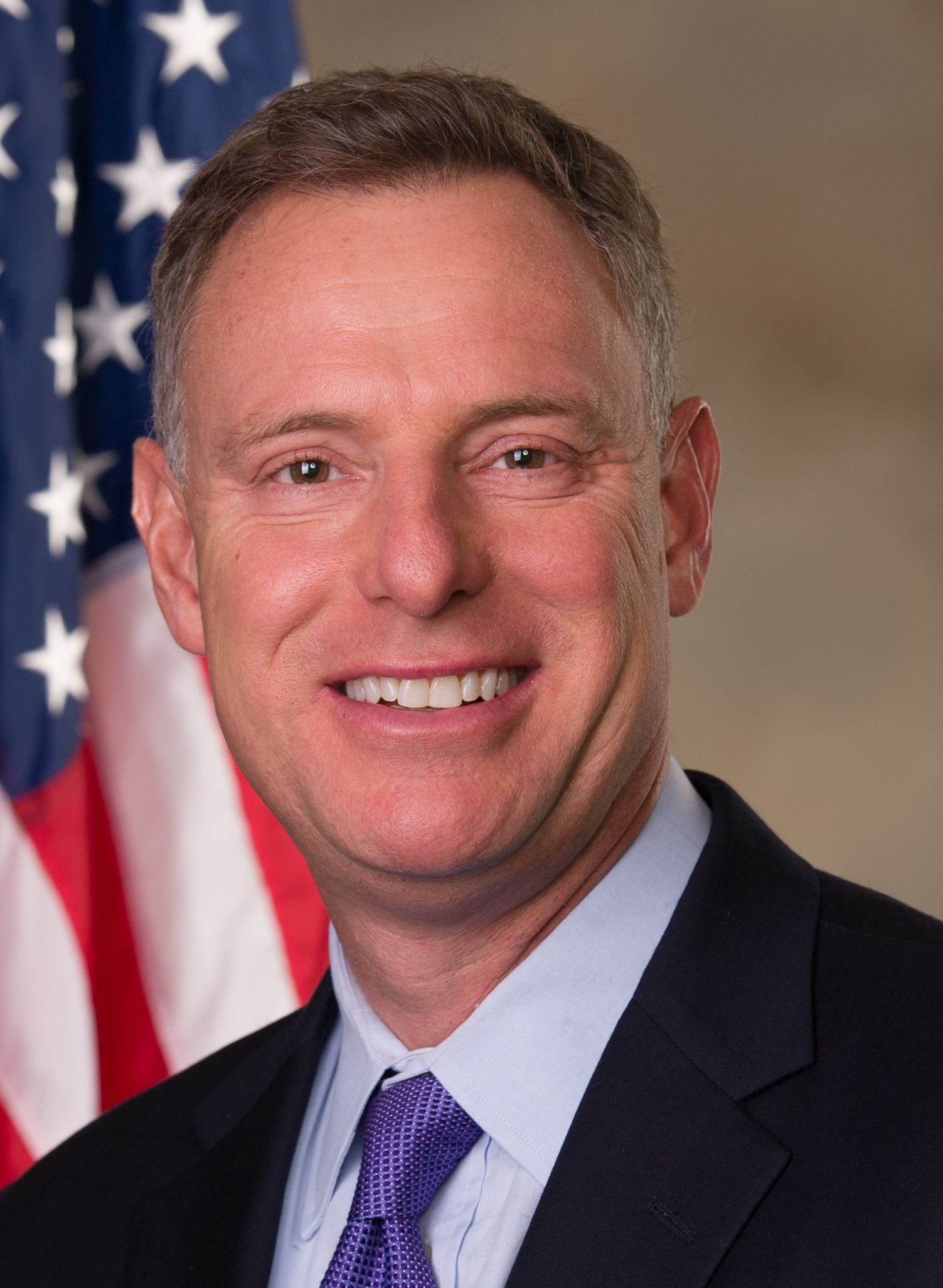

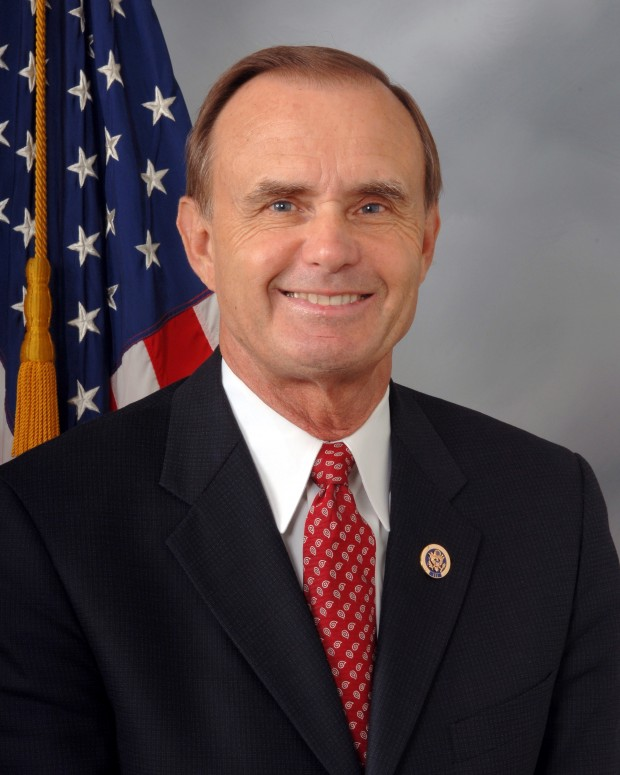
Candidate	Scott Peters	Brian Bilbray
Party	Democratic	Republican
Popular vote	151,451	144,495
Percentage	51.2%	48.8%
- County results Peters: 50–60%
U.S. Representative before election
Brian Bilbray
Republican
Elected U.S. Representative
Scott Peters
Democratic

The 52nd district is based in coastal San Diego and includes La Jolla and Poway. Republican Brian Bilbray, who represented the 50th district from 2006 to 2013 and previously served from 1995 until 2001, ran for re-election here.

=== Primary election ===
==== Republican candidates ====
===== Advanced to general =====
- Brian Bilbray, incumbent U.S. representative

===== Eliminated in primary =====
- Gene Hamilton Carswell, developer, builder and veteran
- Wayne Iverson, physician
- John Stahl, retired business executive and candidate for Florida's 22nd district in 1994
- John Subka, real estate investor

==== Democratic candidates ====
===== Advanced to general =====
- Scott Peters, chair of the Port of San Diego

===== Eliminated in primary =====
- Lori Saldaña, former state assembly member

===== Withdrawn =====
- Shirley Decourt-Park, business owner

===== Declined =====
- Bob Nascenzi, businessman

==== Campaign ====
At its February 2012 convention, the California Democratic Party declined to endorse a candidate for the 52nd district. Bilbray was endorsed by the California Republican Party in March 2012.

==== Endorsements ====
Scott Peters (D)

Labor unions

- AFL-CIO

==== Results ====
Nonpartisan blanket primary results
Party	Candidate	Votes	%
Republican	Brian Bilbray (incumbent)	61,930	41.0
Democratic	Scott Peters	34,106	22.6
Democratic	Lori Saldaña	33,387	22.1
No party preference	Jack Doyle	6,138	4.1
Republican	John K. Stahl	5,502	3.6
Republican	Wayne Iverson	4,476	3.0
Democratic	Shirley Decourt-Park	2,368	1.6
No party preference	Ehab T. Shehata	1,156	0.8
Republican	John L. Subka	1,091	0.7
Republican	Gene Hamilton Carswell	828	0.5
Total votes		150,982	100.0

=== General election ===
==== Endorsements ====
Brian Bilbray (R)

Organizations

- National Republican Congressional Committee "Patriot" Program
- NRA Political Victory Fund
- United States Chamber of Commerce
Scott Peters (D)

Labor unions

- AFL-CIO
- International Brotherhood of Boilermakers
- National Association of Letter Carriers

Organizations

- Democratic Congressional Campaign Committee "Red to Blue" Program
- Human Rights Campaign
- National Organization for Women
- Sierra Club

==== Debate ====
2012 California's 52nd congressional district debate
No.	Date	Host	Moderator	Link	Republican	Democratic
Key: P Participant A Absent N Not invited I Invited W Withdrawn						
Key: P Participant A Absent N Not invited I Invited W Withdrawn					Brian Bilbray	Scott Peters
1	Oct. 10, 2012	San Diego Union-Tribune	Michael Smolens		P	P

==== Polling ====
Poll source	Date(s) administered	Sample size	Margin of error	Brian Bilbray (R)	Scott Peters (D)	Undecided
SurveyUSA	October 28–30, 2012	628 (LV)	± 4.0%	46%	46%	8%
Grove Insight (D-Peters)	October 19–21, 2012	400 (LV)	± 4.9%	40%	45%	15%
Glover Park Group/University of San Diego/U-T San Diego	October 14–17, 2012	374 (LV)	± 5.0%	47%	38%	13%
Grove Insight (D-Peters)	July 16–18, 2012	400 (LV)	± 4.4%	40%	40%	19%

==== Predictions ====
Source	Ranking	As of
The Cook Political Report	Tossup	November 5, 2012
Rothenberg	Tossup	November 2, 2012
Roll Call	Tossup	November 4, 2012
Sabato's Crystal Ball	Lean D (flip)	November 5, 2012
NY Times	Tossup	November 4, 2012
RCP	Tossup	November 4, 2012
The Hill	Tossup	November 4, 2012

==== Results ====
California's 52nd congressional district election, 2012
Party	Candidate	Votes	%
Democratic	Scott Peters	151,451	51.2
Republican	Brian Bilbray (incumbent)	144,495	48.8
Majority		6,956	2.4
Total votes		295,946	100.0
Democratic gain from Republican			

== District 53 ==
2012 California's 53rd congressional district election
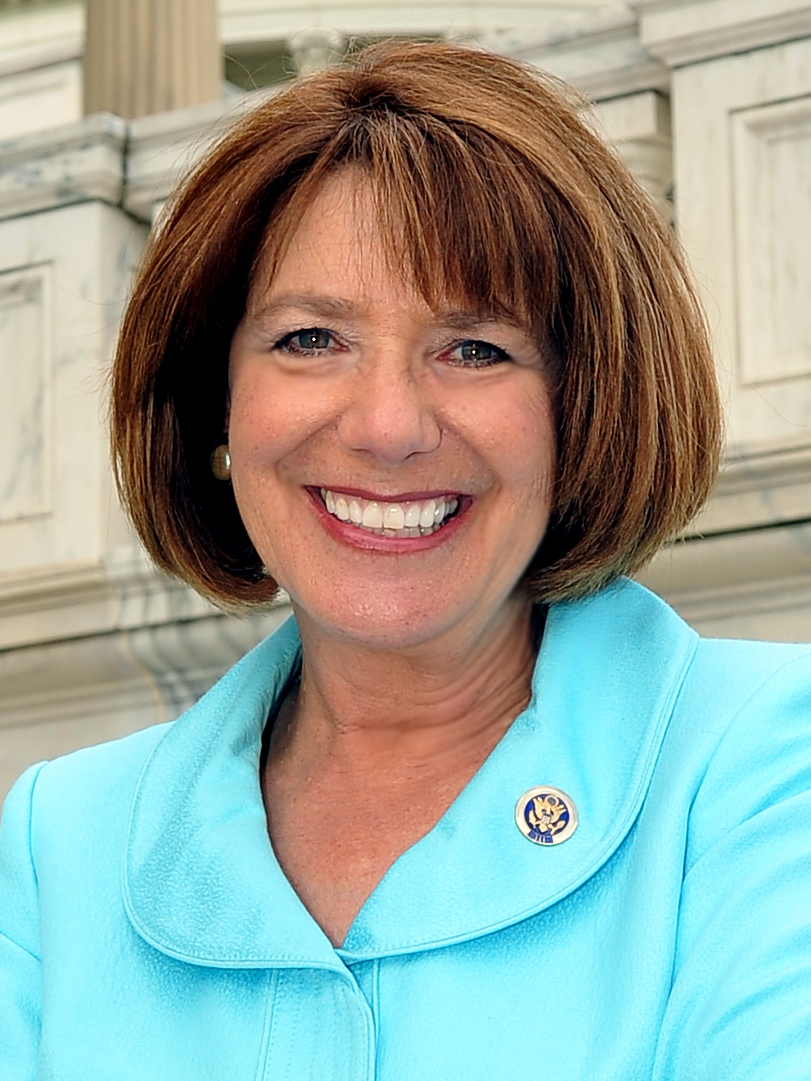

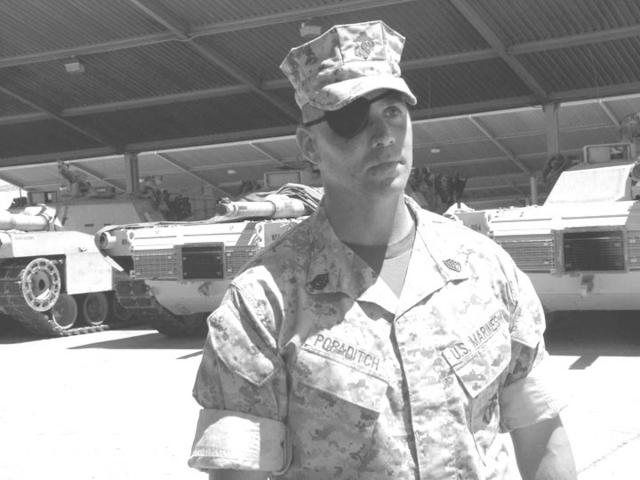
Candidate	Susan Davis	Nick Popaditch
Party	Democratic	Republican
Popular vote	164,825	103,482
Percentage	61.4%	38.6%
- County results Davis: 60–70%
U.S. Representative before election
Susan Davis
Democratic
Elected U.S. Representative
Susan Davis
Democratic

The 53rd district is based in Central San Diego and includes La Mesa and Lemon Grove. Democrat Susan Davis, who had represented the 53rd district since 2003 and previously represented the 49th district from 2001 to 2003, ran for re-election here.

=== Primary election ===
==== Democratic candidates ====
===== Advanced to general =====
- Susan Davis, incumbent U.S. representative

==== Republican candidates ====
===== Advanced to general =====
- Nick Popaditch, retired United States Marine Corps gunnery sergeant and nominee for the 51st district in 2010

==== Campaign ====
Davis received the endorsement of the California Democratic Party in February 2012.

==== Endorsements ====
Susan Davis (D)

Labor unions

- AFL-CIO

Organizations

- Sierra Club

==== Results ====
Nonpartisan blanket primary results
Party	Candidate	Votes	%
Democratic	Susan Davis (incumbent)	70,462	57.8
Republican	Nick Popaditch	51,423	42.2
Republican	Joel A. Marchese (write-in)	7	0.0
Republican	John R. Edwards (write-in)	3	0.0
Total votes		121,895	100.0

=== General election ===
==== Endorsements ====
Susan Davis (D)

Labor unions

- AFL-CIO
- International Brotherhood of Boilermakers
- National Association of Letter Carriers

Organizations

- Human Rights Campaign
- National Organization for Women
- Sierra Club
Nick Popaditch (R)

Organizations

- Iraq Veterans for Congress

==== Predictions ====
Source	Ranking	As of
The Cook Political Report	Safe D	November 5, 2012
Rothenberg	Safe D	November 2, 2012
Roll Call	Safe D	November 4, 2012
Sabato's Crystal Ball	Safe D	November 5, 2012
NY Times	Safe D	November 4, 2012
RCP	Safe D	November 4, 2012
The Hill	Safe D	November 4, 2012

==== Results ====
California's 53rd congressional district election, 2012
Party	Candidate	Votes	%
Democratic	Susan Davis (incumbent)	164,825	61.4
Republican	Nick Popaditch	103,482	38.6
Total votes		268,307	100.0
Democratic hold			
