= 2006 United States House of Representatives elections in California =

- November 7, 2006

All 53 California seats to the United States House of Representatives
| | Majority party | Minority party |
|---|---|---|
| Party | Democratic | Republican |
| Last election | 33 | 20 |
| Seats won | 34 | 19 |
| Seat change | ▲1 | ▼1 |
| Popular vote | 4,720,714 | 3,329,485 |
| Percentage | 53.05% | 37.41% |
| Swing | ▼0.49% | ▼5.87% |

Democratic hold Democratic gain
Republican hold
Democratic
40–50%
50–60%
60–70%
70–80%
80–90%
90–100%
Republican
40–50%
50–60%
60–70%
70–80%

The United States House of Representatives elections in California, 2006 were elections for California's delegation to the United States House of Representatives. The congressional elections in California occurred along with congressional elections nationwide and state elections on November 7, 2006. Only one of California's 53 congressional districts, the 11th, changed party control when Democrat Jerry McNerney defeated Republican Richard Pombo.

== Overview ==
United States House of Representatives elections in California, 2006
| Party | Votes | Percentage | Seats | +/– |
|---|---|---|---|---|
| Democratic | 4,720,714 | 53.05% | 34 | +1 |
| Republican | 3,329,485 | 37.41% | 19 | –1 |
| Libertarian | 170,711 | 1.92% | 0 | 0 |
| Green | 48,445 | 0.54% | 0 | 0 |
| Peace and Freedom | 27,467 | 0.31% | 0 | 0 |
| American Independent | 11,694 | 0.13% | 0 | 0 |
| Independent | 2,755 | 0.03% | 0 | 0 |
| Invalid or blank votes | 603,243 | 6.78% | — | — |
| Totals | 8,899,059 | 100.00% | 53 | — |

== District 1 ==
2006 California's 1st congressional district election
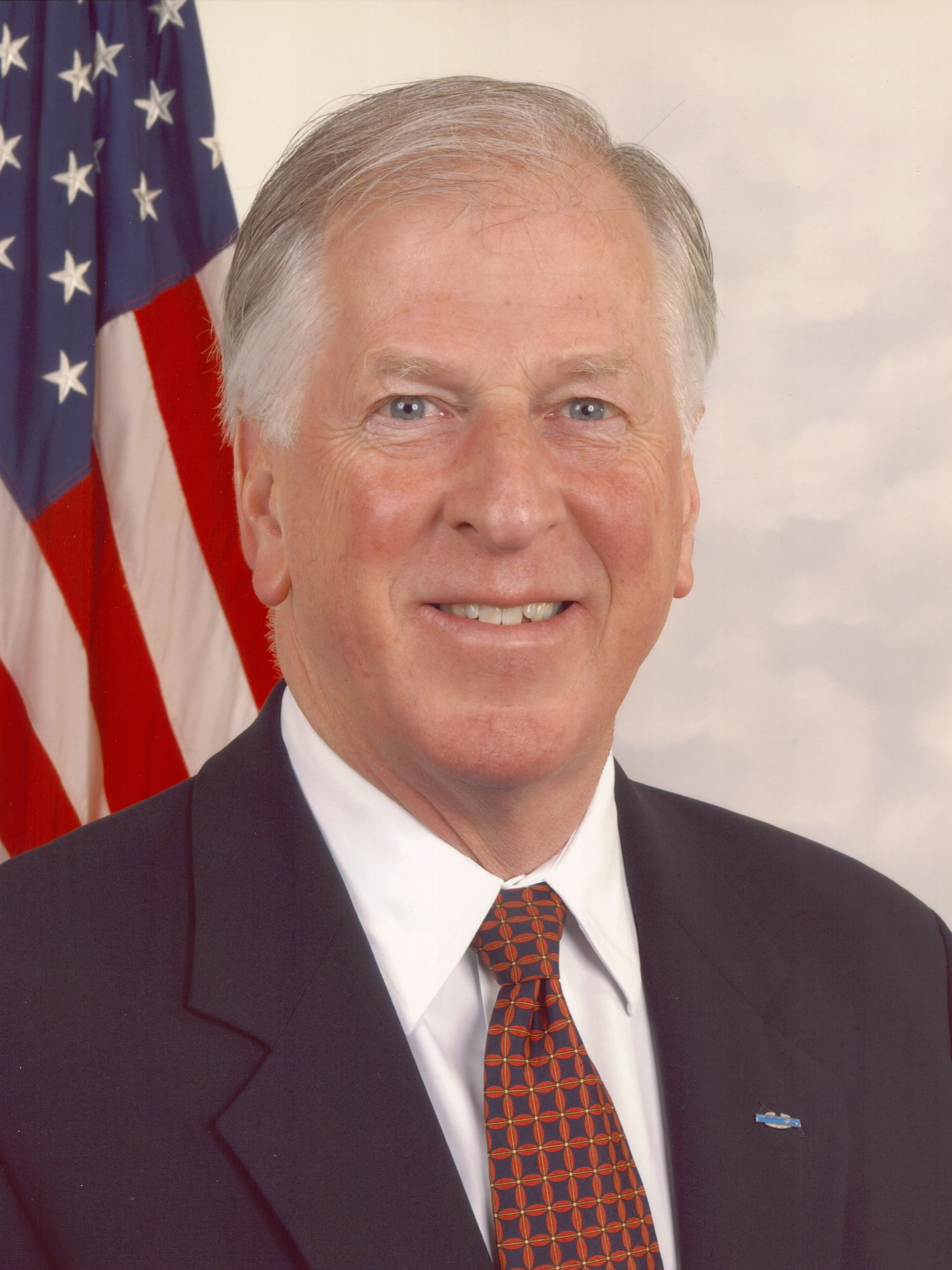

| Nominee | Mike Thompson | John Jones |
| Party | Democratic | Republican |
| Popular vote | 144,409 | 63,194 |
| Percentage | 66.2% | 29.0% |
- County results Thompson: 50–60% 60–70%
U.S. Representative before election
Mike Thompson
Democratic
Elected U.S. Representative
Mike Thompson
Democratic

=== Predictions ===
| Source | Ranking | As of |
|---|---|---|
| The Cook Political Report | Safe D | November 6, 2006 |
| Rothenberg | Safe D | November 6, 2006 |
| Sabato's Crystal Ball | Safe D | November 6, 2006 |
| Real Clear Politics | Safe D | November 7, 2006 |
| CQ Politics | Safe D | November 7, 2006 |

=== Results ===
California's 1st congressional district election, 2006
| Party | Candidate | Votes | % |
|---|---|---|---|
| Democratic | Mike Thompson (incumbent) | 144,409 | 66.23 |
| Republican | John Jones | 63,194 | 28.98 |
| Green | Pamela Elizondo | 6,899 | 3.16 |
| Peace and Freedom | Timothy Stock | 3,503 | 1.61 |
| Independent | Carol Wolman (write-in) | 39 | 0.02 |
| Total votes | | 218,044 | 100.00 |
| Turnout | | | |
| Democratic hold | | | |

== District 2 ==
2006 California's 2nd congressional district election
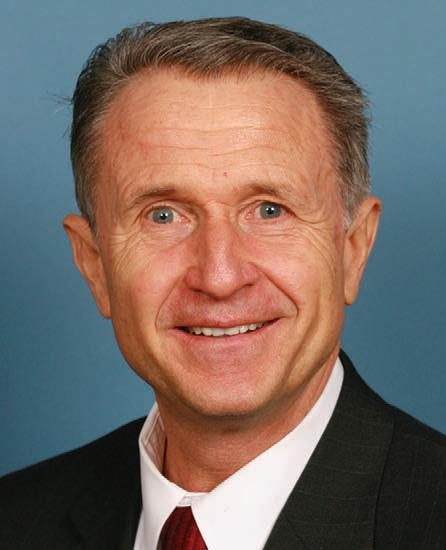

| Nominee | Wally Herger | Arjinderpal Sekhon |
| Party | Republican | Democratic |
| Popular vote | 134,911 | 68,234 |
| Percentage | 64.2% | 32.5% |
- County results Herger: 50–60% 60–70% 70–80%
U.S. Representative before election
Wally Herger
Republican
Elected U.S. Representative
Wally Herger
Republican

=== Predictions ===
| Source | Ranking | As of |
|---|---|---|
| The Cook Political Report | Safe R | November 6, 2006 |
| Rothenberg | Safe R | November 6, 2006 |
| Sabato's Crystal Ball | Safe R | November 6, 2006 |
| Real Clear Politics | Safe R | November 7, 2006 |
| CQ Politics | Safe R | November 7, 2006 |

=== Results ===
California's 2nd congressional district election, 2006
| Party | Candidate | Votes | % |
|---|---|---|---|
| Republican | Wally Herger (incumbent) | 134,911 | 64.18 |
| Democratic | Arjinderpal Sekhon | 68,234 | 32.46 |
| Libertarian | E. Kent Hinesley | 7,057 | 3.36 |
| Total votes | | 210,202 | 100.00 |
| Turnout | | | |
| Republican hold | | | |

== District 3 ==
2006 California's 3rd congressional district election
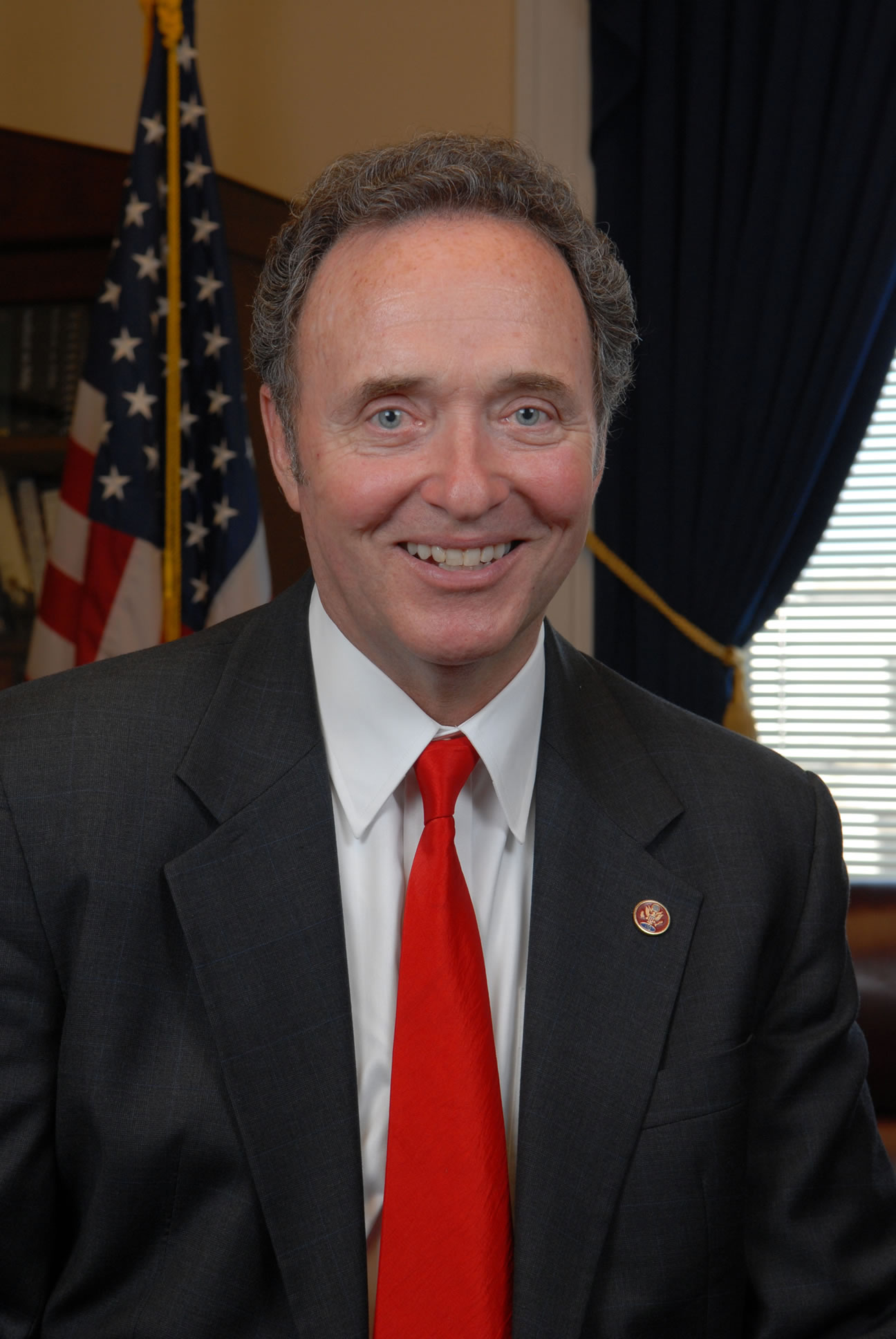

| Nominee | Dan Lungren | Bill Durston |
| Party | Republican | Democratic |
| Popular vote | 135,709 | 86,318 |
| Percentage | 59.5% | 37.8% |
- County results Lungren: 50–60% 60–70% Durston: 40–50%
U.S. Representative before election
Dan Lungren
Republican
Elected U.S. Representative
Dan Lungren
Republican

=== Predictions ===
| Source | Ranking | As of |
|---|---|---|
| The Cook Political Report | Safe R | November 6, 2006 |
| Rothenberg | Safe R | November 6, 2006 |
| Sabato's Crystal Ball | Safe R | November 6, 2006 |
| Real Clear Politics | Safe R | November 7, 2006 |
| CQ Politics | Safe R | November 7, 2006 |

=== Results ===
California's 3rd congressional district election, 2006
| Party | Candidate | Votes | % |
|---|---|---|---|
| Republican | Dan Lungren (incumbent) | 135,709 | 59.48 |
| Democratic | Bill Durston | 86,318 | 37.83 |
| Libertarian | Douglas Tuma | 3,772 | 1.65 |
| Peace and Freedom | Michael Roskey | 2,370 | 1.04 |
| Total votes | | 228,169 | 100.00 |
| Turnout | | | |
| Republican hold | | | |

== District 4 ==
2006 California's 4th congressional district election
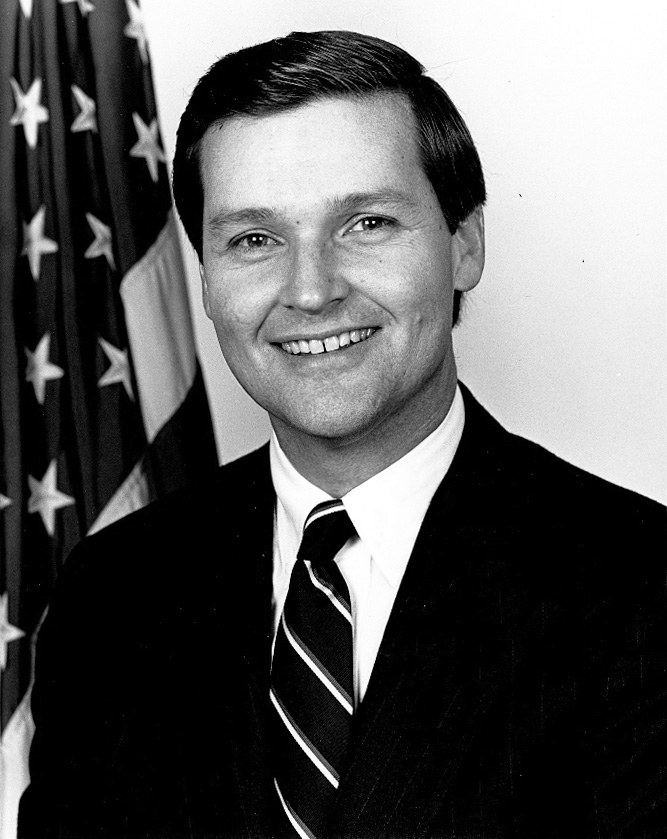

| Nominee | John Doolittle | Charles Brown | Dan Warren |
| Party | Republican | Democratic | Libertarian |
| Popular vote | 135,818 | 126,999 | 14,076 |
| Percentage | 49.0% | 45.9% | 5.1% |
- County results Doolittle: 40–50% 50–60% 60–70% Brown: 50–60%
U.S. Representative before election
John Doolittle
Republican
Elected U.S. Representative
John Doolittle
Republican

=== Endorsements ===
Charles Brown (D)

Individuals

- Wesley Clark, General, 2004 democratic presidential candidate

==== Predictions ====
| Source | Ranking | As of |
|---|---|---|
| The Cook Political Report | Lean R | November 6, 2006 |
| Rothenberg | Tilt R | November 6, 2006 |
| Sabato's Crystal Ball | Lean R | November 6, 2006 |
| Real Clear Politics | Lean R | November 7, 2006 |
| CQ Politics | Lean R | November 7, 2006 |

=== Results ===
California's 4th congressional district election, 2006
| Party | Candidate | Votes | % |
|---|---|---|---|
| Republican | John Doolittle (incumbent) | 135,818 | 49.05 |
| Democratic | Charles Brown | 126,999 | 45.87 |
| Libertarian | Dan Warren | 14,076 | 5.08 |
| Total votes | | 276,893 | 100.00 |
| Turnout | | | |
| Republican hold | | | |

== District 5 ==
2006 California's 5th congressional district election
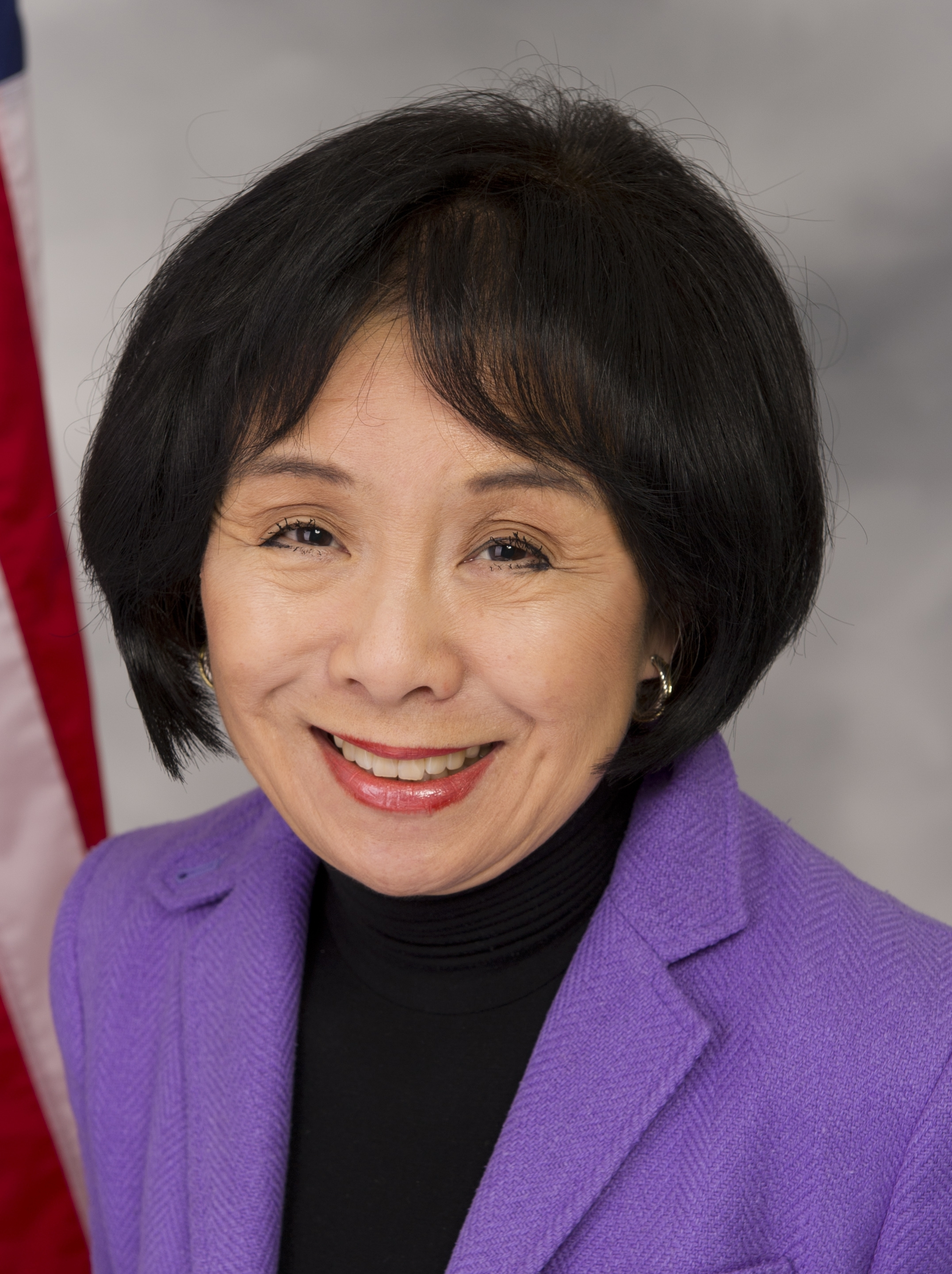

| Nominee | Doris Matsui | Xiaochin Yan |
| Party | Democratic | Republican |
| Popular vote | 105,676 | 35,106 |
| Percentage | 70.8% | 23.5% |
- County results Matsui: 70–80%
U.S. Representative before election
Doris Matsui
Democratic
Elected U.S. Representative
Doris Matsui
Democratic

=== Predictions ===
| Source | Ranking | As of |
|---|---|---|
| The Cook Political Report | Safe D | November 6, 2006 |
| Rothenberg | Safe D | November 6, 2006 |
| Sabato's Crystal Ball | Safe D | November 6, 2006 |
| Real Clear Politics | Safe D | November 7, 2006 |
| CQ Politics | Safe D | November 7, 2006 |

=== Results ===
California's 5th congressional district election, 2006
| Party | Candidate | Votes | % |
|---|---|---|---|
| Democratic | Doris Matsui (incumbent) | 105,676 | 70.80 |
| Republican | Xiaochin Yan | 35,106 | 23.52 |
| Green | Jeff Kravitz | 6,466 | 4.33 |
| Peace and Freedom | John Reiger | 2,018 | 1.35 |
| Total votes | | 149,266 | 100.00 |
| Turnout | | | |
| Democratic hold | | | |

== District 6 ==
2006 California's 6th congressional district election
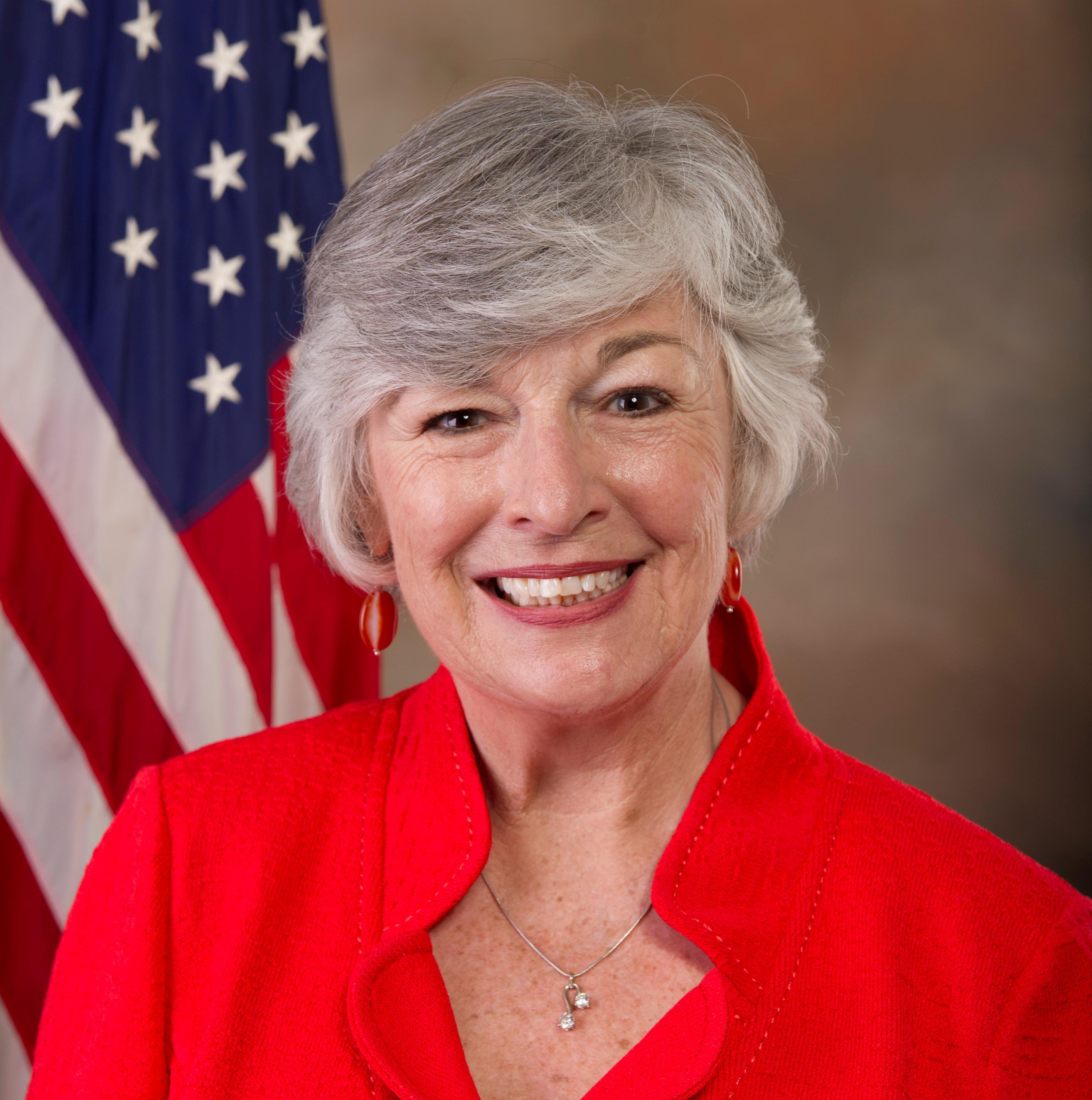

| Nominee | Lynn Woolsey | Todd Hooper |
| Party | Democratic | Republican |
| Popular vote | 173,190 | 64,405 |
| Percentage | 70.2% | 26.1% |
- County results Woolsey: 60–70% 70–80%
U.S. Representative before election
Lynn Woolsey
Democratic
Elected U.S. Representative
Lynn Woolsey
Democratic

=== Predictions ===
| Source | Ranking | As of |
|---|---|---|
| The Cook Political Report | Safe D | November 6, 2006 |
| Rothenberg | Safe D | November 6, 2006 |
| Sabato's Crystal Ball | Safe D | November 6, 2006 |
| Real Clear Politics | Safe D | November 7, 2006 |
| CQ Politics | Safe D | November 7, 2006 |

=== Results ===
California's 6th congressional district election, 2006
| Party | Candidate | Votes | % |
|---|---|---|---|
| Democratic | Lynn Woolsey (incumbent) | 173,190 | 70.22 |
| Republican | Todd Hooper | 64,405 | 26.11 |
| Libertarian | Richard Friesen | 9,028 | 3.66 |
| Republican | Michael Halliwell (write-in) | 5 | 0.00 |
| Total votes | | 246,628 | 100.00 |
| Turnout | | | |
| Democratic hold | | | |

== District 7 ==
2006 California's 7th congressional district election
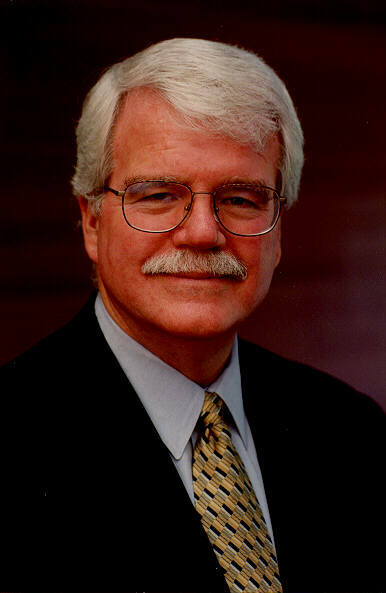

| Nominee | George Miller | Camden McConnell |
| Party | Democratic | Libertarian |
| Popular vote | 118,000 | 22,486 |
| Percentage | 84.0% | 16.0% |
- County results Miller: 80–90%
U.S. Representative before election
George Miller
Democratic
Elected U.S. Representative
George Miller
Democratic

=== Predictions ===
| Source | Ranking | As of |
|---|---|---|
| The Cook Political Report | Safe D | November 6, 2006 |
| Rothenberg | Safe D | November 6, 2006 |
| Sabato's Crystal Ball | Safe D | November 6, 2006 |
| Real Clear Politics | Safe D | November 7, 2006 |
| CQ Politics | Safe D | November 7, 2006 |

=== Results ===
California's 7th congressional district election, 2006
| Party | Candidate | Votes | % |
|---|---|---|---|
| Democratic | George Miller (incumbent) | 118,000 | 83.99 |
| Libertarian | Camden McConnell | 22,486 | 16.01 |
| Total votes | | 140,486 | 100.00 |
| Turnout | | | |
| Democratic hold | | | |

== District 8 ==
2006 California's 8th congressional district election
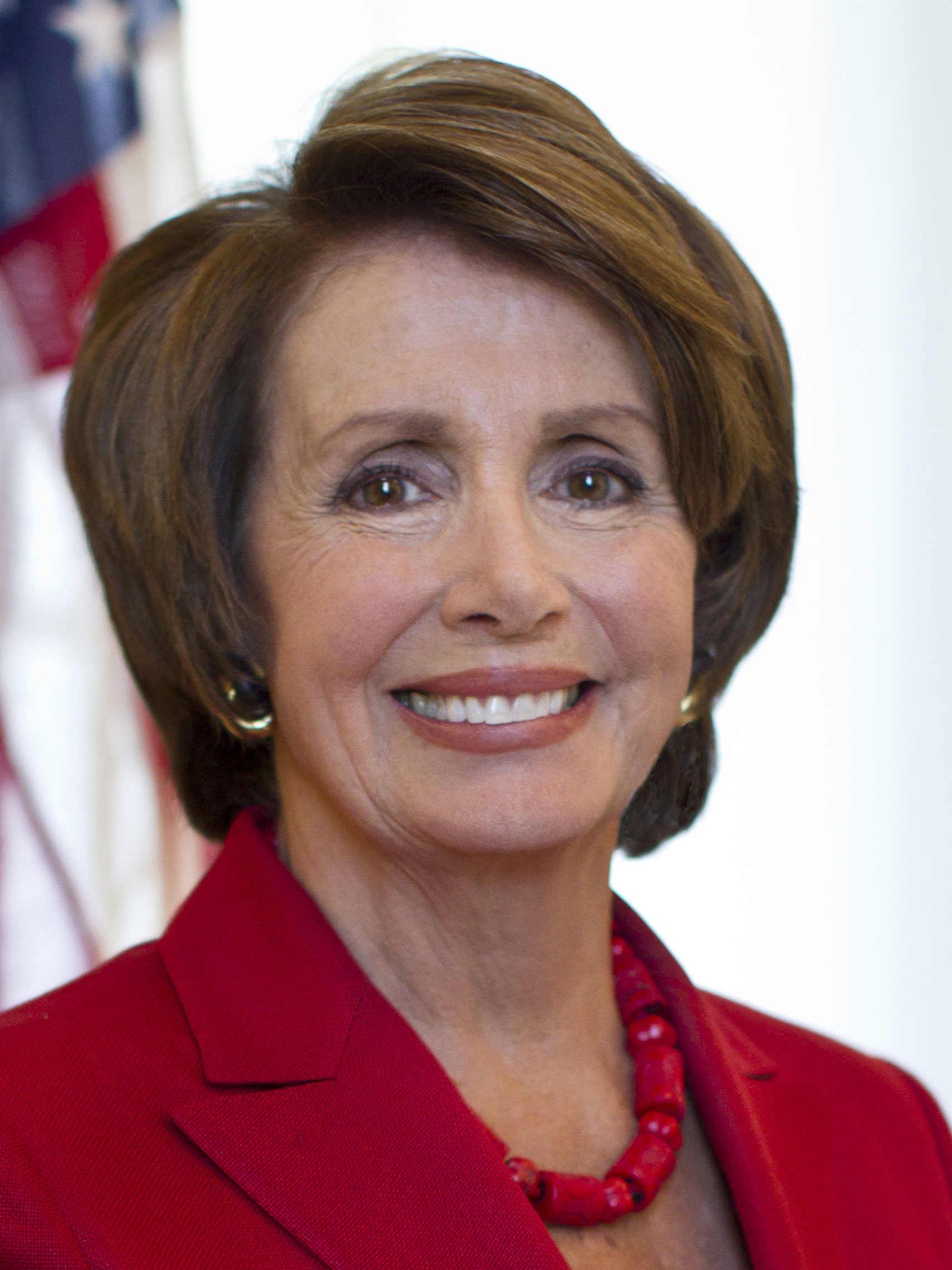

| Nominee | Nancy Pelosi | Mike DeNunzio | Krissy Keefer |
| Party | Democratic | Republican | Green |
| Popular vote | 148,435 | 19,800 | 13,653 |
| Percentage | 80.4% | 10.7% | 7.4% |
- County results Pelosi: 80–90%
U.S. Representative before election
Nancy Pelosi
Democratic
Elected U.S. Representative
Nancy Pelosi
Democratic

=== Predictions ===
| Source | Ranking | As of |
|---|---|---|
| The Cook Political Report | Safe D | November 6, 2006 |
| Rothenberg | Safe D | November 6, 2006 |
| Sabato's Crystal Ball | Safe D | November 6, 2006 |
| Real Clear Politics | Safe D | November 7, 2006 |
| CQ Politics | Safe D | November 7, 2006 |

=== Results ===
California's 8th congressional district election, 2006
| Party | Candidate | Votes | % |
|---|---|---|---|
| Democratic | Nancy Pelosi (incumbent) | 148,435 | 80.39 |
| Republican | Mike DeNunzio | 19,800 | 10.72 |
| Green | Krissy Keefer | 13,653 | 7.39 |
| Libertarian | Philip Berg | 2,751 | 1.49 |
| Total votes | | 184,639 | 100.00 |
| Turnout | | | |
| Democratic hold | | | |

== District 9 ==
2006 California's 9th congressional district election
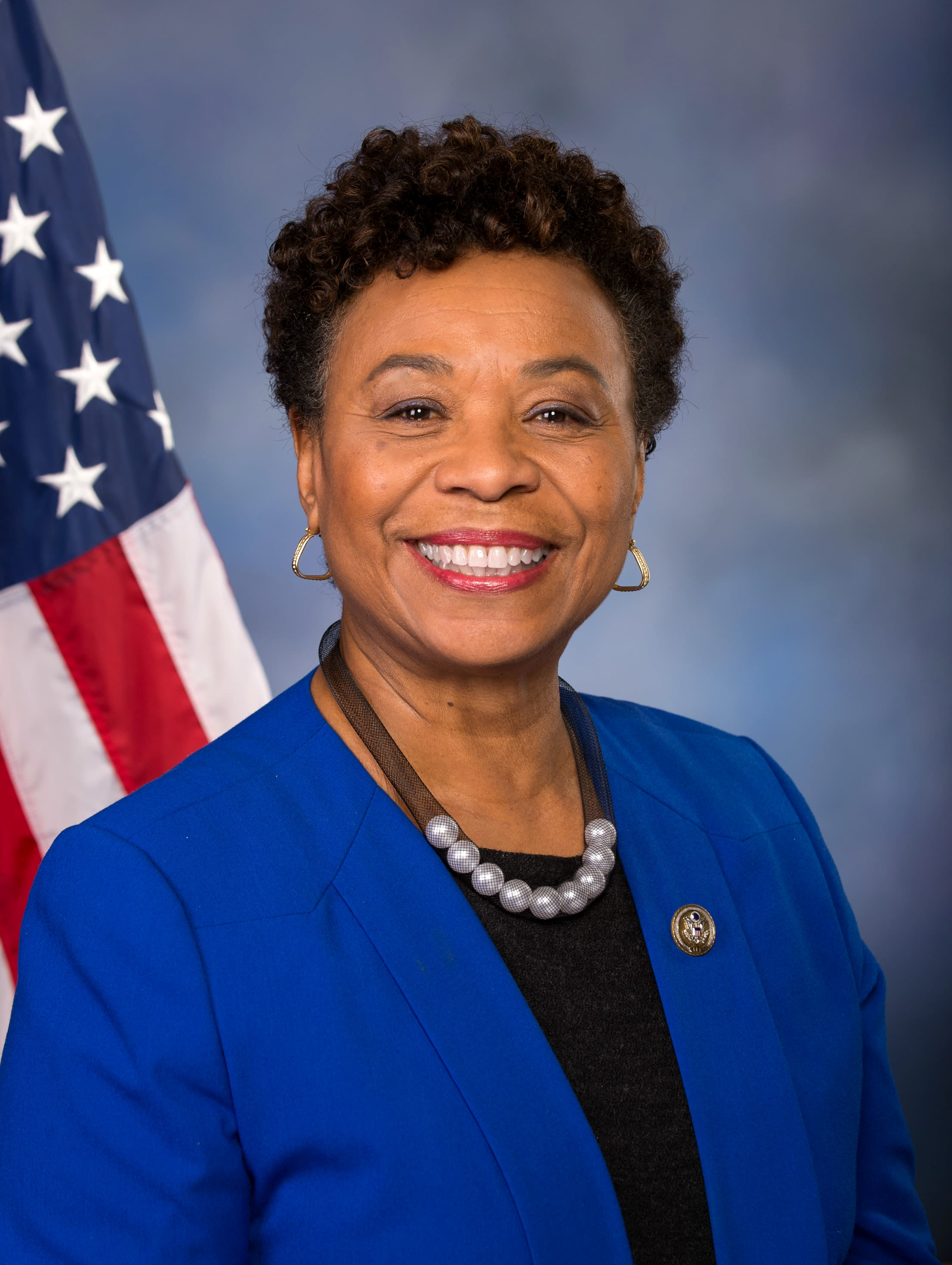

| Nominee | Barbara Lee | John denDulk |
| Party | Democratic | Republican |
| Popular vote | 167,245 | 20,786 |
| Percentage | 86.3% | 10.7% |
- County results Lee: 80–90%
U.S. Representative before election
Barbara Lee
Democratic
Elected U.S. Representative
Barbara Lee
Democratic

=== Predictions ===
| Source | Ranking | As of |
|---|---|---|
| The Cook Political Report | Safe D | November 6, 2006 |
| Rothenberg | Safe D | November 6, 2006 |
| Sabato's Crystal Ball | Safe D | November 6, 2006 |
| Real Clear Politics | Safe D | November 7, 2006 |
| CQ Politics | Safe D | November 7, 2006 |

=== Results ===
California's 9th congressional district election, 2006
| Party | Candidate | Votes | % |
|---|---|---|---|
| Democratic | Barbara Lee (incumbent) | 167,245 | 86.35 |
| Republican | John denDulk | 20,786 | 10.73 |
| Libertarian | James Eyer | 5,655 | 2.92 |
| Total votes | | 193,686 | 100.00 |
| Turnout | | | |
| Democratic hold | | | |

== District 10 ==
2006 California's 10th congressional district election
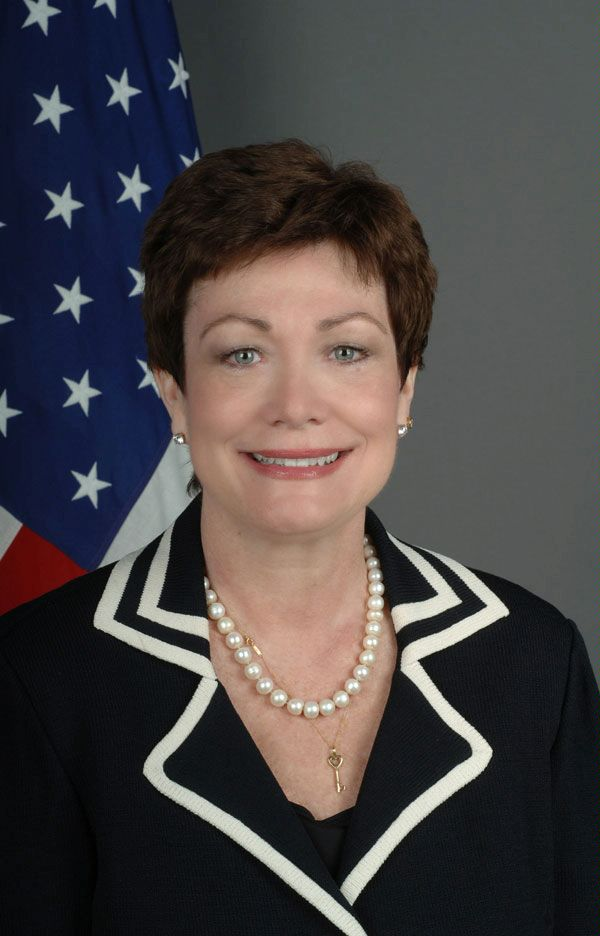

| Nominee | Ellen Tauscher | Darcy Linn |
| Party | Democratic | Republican |
| Popular vote | 130,859 | 66,069 |
| Percentage | 67.6% | 34.1% |
U.S. Representative before election
Ellen Tauscher
Democratic
Elected U.S. Representative
Ellen Tauscher
Democratic

=== Predictions ===
| Source | Ranking | As of |
|---|---|---|
| The Cook Political Report | Safe D | November 6, 2006 |
| Rothenberg | Safe D | November 6, 2006 |
| Sabato's Crystal Ball | Safe D | November 6, 2006 |
| Real Clear Politics | Safe D | November 7, 2006 |
| CQ Politics | Safe D | November 7, 2006 |

=== Results ===
California's 10th congressional district election, 2006
| Party | Candidate | Votes | % |
|---|---|---|---|
| Democratic | Ellen Tauscher (incumbent) | 130,859 | 67.56 |
| Republican | Darcy Linn | 66,069 | 34.11 |
| Republican | Jeff Ketelson (write-in) | 50 | 0.03 |
| Total votes | | 196,978 | 100.00 |
| Turnout | | | |
| Democratic hold | | | |

== District 11 ==
2006 California's 11th congressional district election
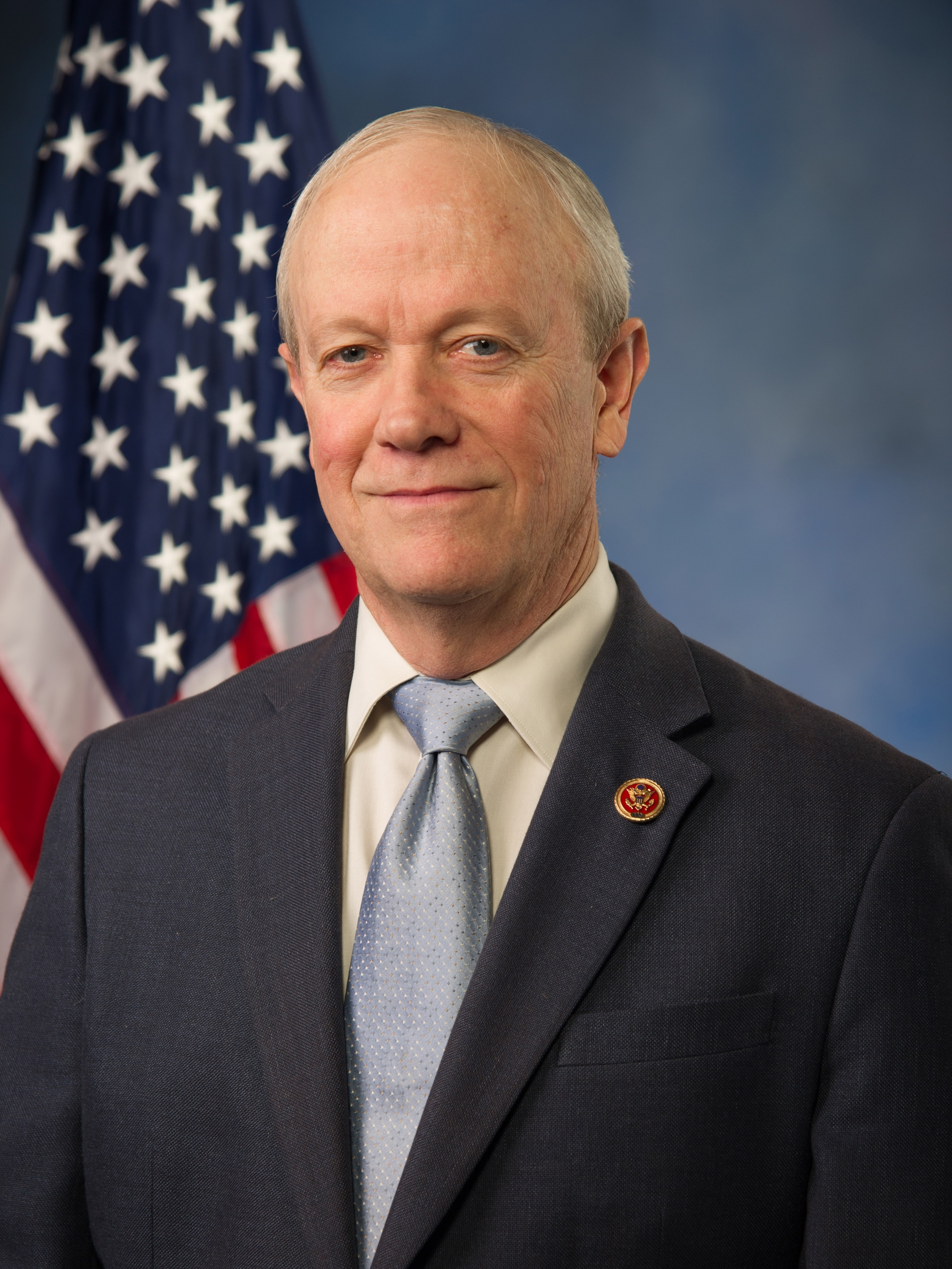

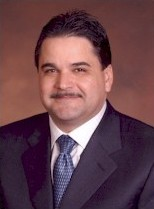
| Nominee | Jerry McNerney | Richard Pombo |
| Party | Democratic | Republican |
| Popular vote | 109,868 | 96,396 |
| Percentage | 53.3% | 46.7% |
- County results Mcnerney: 50–60% 60–70% Pombo: 50–60%
U.S. Representative before election
Richard Pombo
Republican
Elected U.S. Representative
Jerry McNerney
Democratic

=== Predictions ===
| Source | Ranking | As of |
|---|---|---|
| The Cook Political Report | Tossup | November 6, 2006 |
| Rothenberg | Tossup | November 6, 2006 |
| Sabato's Crystal Ball | Tilt D (flip) | November 6, 2006 |
| Real Clear Politics | Tossup | November 7, 2006 |
| CQ Politics | Lean R | November 7, 2006 |

=== Results ===
California's 11th congressional district election, 2006
| Party | Candidate | Votes | % |
|---|---|---|---|
| Democratic | Jerry McNerney | 109,868 | 53.27 |
| Republican | Richard Pombo (incumbent) | 96,396 | 46.73 |
| Total votes | | 206,264 | 100.00 |
| Turnout | | | |
| Democratic gain from Republican | | | |

== District 12 ==
2006 California's 12th congressional district election
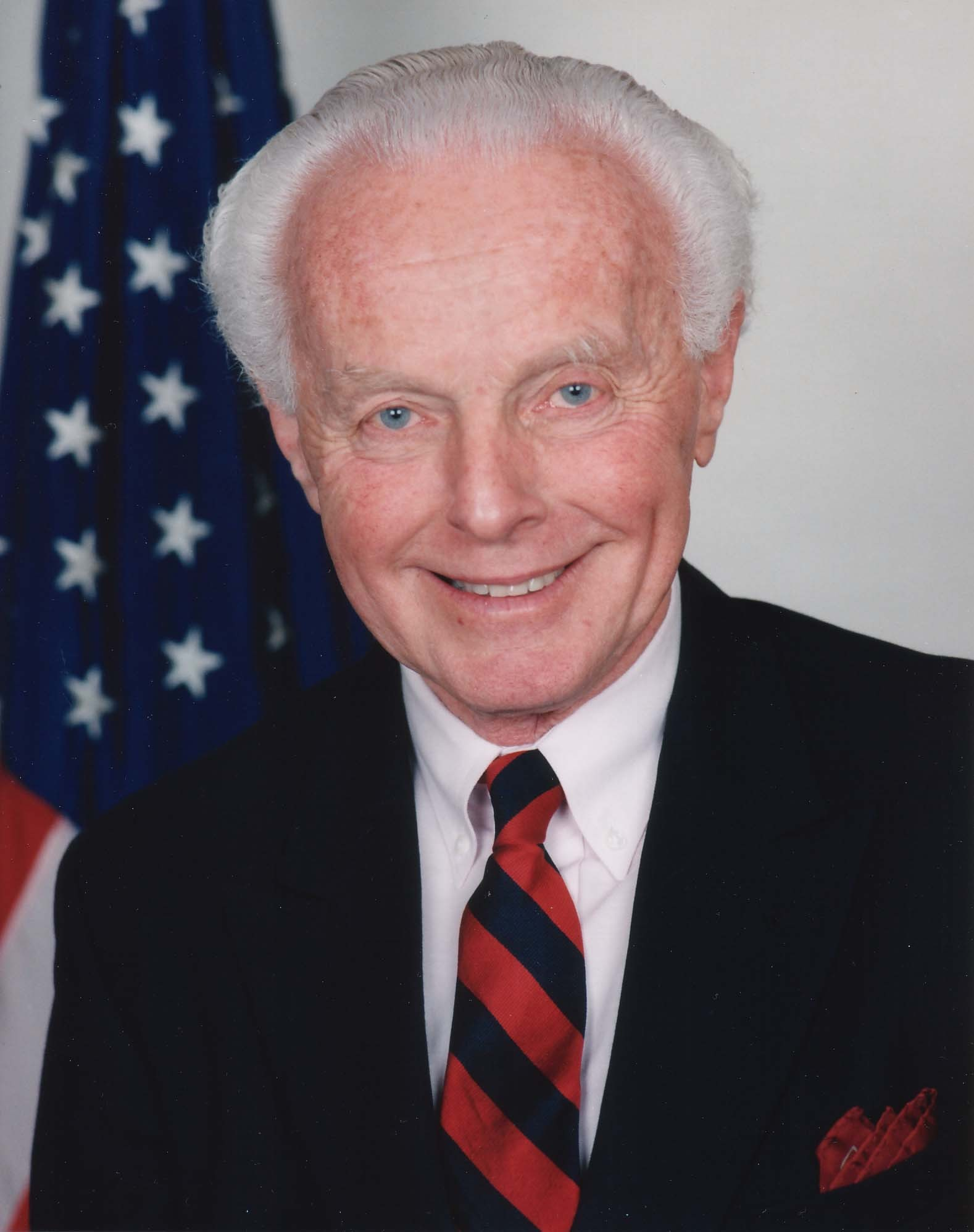

| Nominee | Tom Lantos | Mike Moloney |
| Party | Democratic | Republican |
| Popular vote | 138,650 | 43,674 |
| Percentage | 76.0% | 23.9% |
- County results Lantos: 70–80% 80–90%
U.S. Representative before election
Tom Lantos
Democratic
Elected U.S. Representative
Tom Lantos
Democratic

=== Predictions ===
| Source | Ranking | As of |
|---|---|---|
| The Cook Political Report | Safe D | November 6, 2006 |
| Rothenberg | Safe D | November 6, 2006 |
| Sabato's Crystal Ball | Safe D | November 6, 2006 |
| Real Clear Politics | Safe D | November 7, 2006 |
| CQ Politics | Safe D | November 7, 2006 |

=== Results ===
California's 12th congressional district election, 2006
| Party | Candidate | Votes | % |
|---|---|---|---|
| Democratic | Tom Lantos (incumbent) | 138,650 | 76.05 |
| Republican | Mike Moloney | 43,674 | 23.95 |
| Total votes | | 182,324 | 100.00 |
| Turnout | | | |
| Democratic hold | | | |

== District 13 ==
2006 California's 13th congressional district election
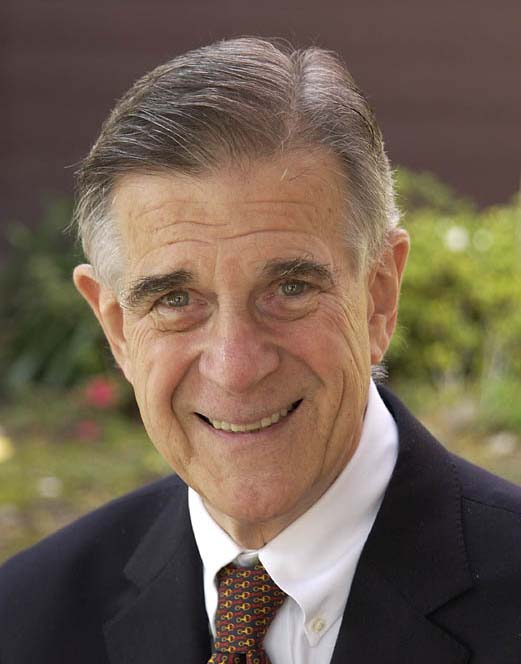

| Nominee | Pete Stark | George Bruno |
| Party | Democratic | Republican |
| Popular vote | 110,756 | 37,141 |
| Percentage | 74.9% | 25.1% |
- County results Stark: 70–80%
U.S. Representative before election
Pete Stark
Democratic
Elected U.S. Representative
Pete Stark
Democratic

=== Predictions ===
| Source | Ranking | As of |
|---|---|---|
| The Cook Political Report | Safe D | November 6, 2006 |
| Rothenberg | Safe D | November 6, 2006 |
| Sabato's Crystal Ball | Safe D | November 6, 2006 |
| Real Clear Politics | Safe D | November 7, 2006 |
| CQ Politics | Safe D | November 7, 2006 |

=== Results ===
California's 13th congressional district election, 2006
| Party | Candidate | Votes | % |
|---|---|---|---|
| Democratic | Pete Stark (incumbent) | 110,756 | 74.89 |
| Republican | George Bruno | 37,141 | 25.11 |
| Total votes | | 147,897 | 100.00 |
| Turnout | | | |
| Democratic hold | | | |

== District 14 ==
2006 California's 14th congressional district election
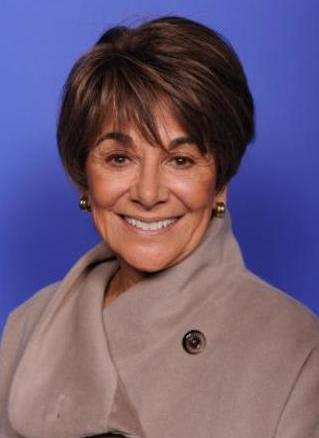

| Nominee | Anna Eshoo | Rob Smith |
| Party | Democratic | Republican |
| Popular vote | 141,153 | 48,097 |
| Percentage | 71.1% | 24.2% |
- County results Eshoo: 60–70% 70–80%
U.S. Representative before election
Anna Eshoo
Democratic
Elected U.S. Representative
Anna Eshoo
Democratic

=== Predictions ===
| Source | Ranking | As of |
|---|---|---|
| The Cook Political Report | Safe D | November 6, 2006 |
| Rothenberg | Safe D | November 6, 2006 |
| Sabato's Crystal Ball | Safe D | November 6, 2006 |
| Real Clear Politics | Safe D | November 7, 2006 |
| CQ Politics | Safe D | November 7, 2006 |

=== Results ===
California's 14th congressional district election, 2006
| Party | Candidate | Votes | % |
|---|---|---|---|
| Democratic | Anna Eshoo (incumbent) | 141,153 | 71.08 |
| Republican | Rob Smith | 48,097 | 24.22 |
| Libertarian | Brian Holtz | 4,692 | 2.36 |
| Green | Carol Brouillet | 4,633 | 2.33 |
| Total votes | | 198,575 | 100.00 |
| Turnout | | | |
| Democratic hold | | | |

== District 15 ==
2006 California's 15th congressional district election
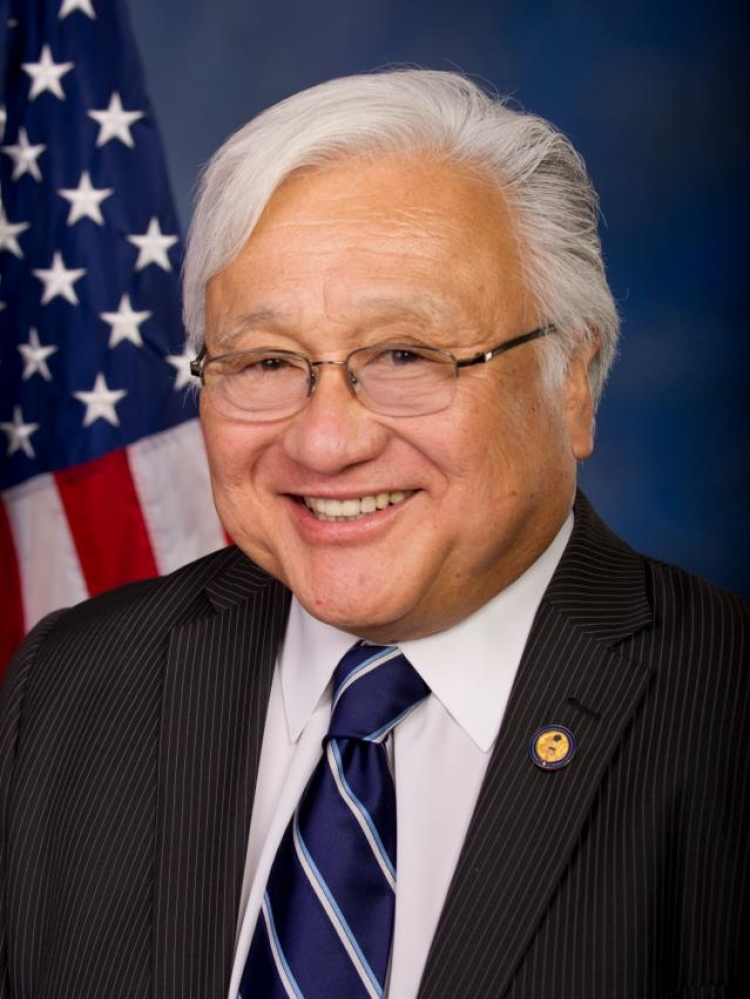

| Nominee | Mike Honda | Raymond Chukwu |
| Party | Democratic | Republican |
| Popular vote | 115,532 | 44,186 |
| Percentage | 72.3% | 27.7% |
- County results Honda: 70–80%
U.S. Representative before election
Mike Honda
Democratic
Elected U.S. Representative
Mike Honda
Democratic

=== Predictions ===
| Source | Ranking | As of |
|---|---|---|
| The Cook Political Report | Safe D | November 6, 2006 |
| Rothenberg | Safe D | November 6, 2006 |
| Sabato's Crystal Ball | Safe D | November 6, 2006 |
| Real Clear Politics | Safe D | November 7, 2006 |
| CQ Politics | Safe D | November 7, 2006 |

=== Results ===
California's 15th congressional district election, 2006
| Party | Candidate | Votes | % |
|---|---|---|---|
| Democratic | Mike Honda (incumbent) | 115,532 | 72.33 |
| Republican | Raymond Chukwu | 44,186 | 27.67 |
| Total votes | | 159,718 | 100.00 |
| Turnout | | | |
| Democratic hold | | | |

== District 16 ==
2006 California's 16th congressional district election
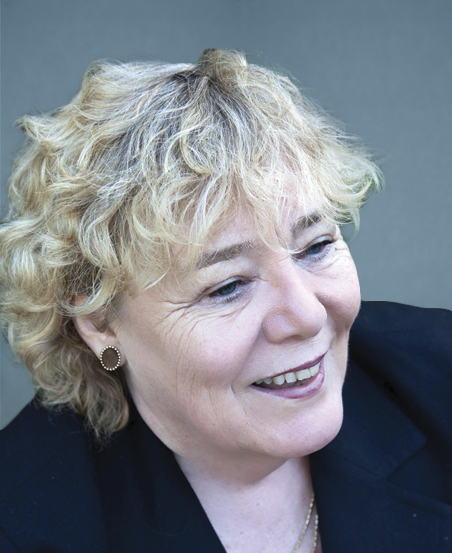

| Nominee | Zoe Lofgren | Charel Winston |
| Party | Democratic | Republican |
| Popular vote | 98,929 | 37,130 |
| Percentage | 72.7% | 27.3% |
- County results Lofgren: 70–80%
U.S. Representative before election
Zoe Lofgren
Democratic
Elected U.S. Representative
Zoe Lofgren
Democratic

=== Predictions ===
| Source | Ranking | As of |
|---|---|---|
| The Cook Political Report | Safe D | November 6, 2006 |
| Rothenberg | Safe D | November 6, 2006 |
| Sabato's Crystal Ball | Safe D | November 6, 2006 |
| Real Clear Politics | Safe D | November 7, 2006 |
| CQ Politics | Safe D | November 7, 2006 |

=== Results ===
California's 16th congressional district election, 2006
| Party | Candidate | Votes | % |
|---|---|---|---|
| Democratic | Zoe Lofgren (incumbent) | 98,929 | 72.71 |
| Republican | Charel Winston | 37,130 | 27.29 |
| Total votes | | 136,059 | 100.00 |
| Turnout | | | |
| Democratic hold | | | |

== District 17 ==
2006 California's 17th congressional district election
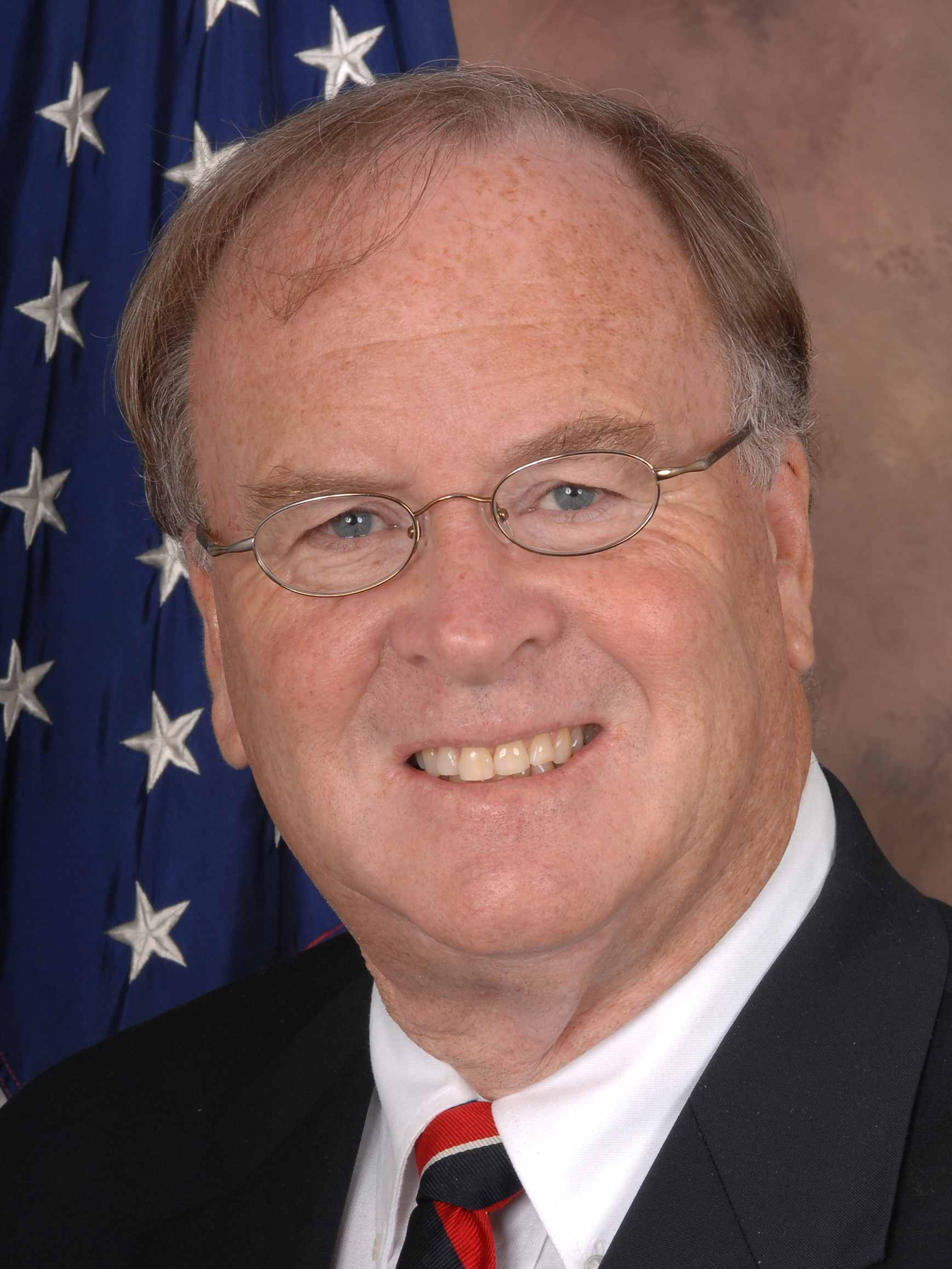

| Nominee | Sam Farr | Anthony De Maio |
| Party | Democratic | Republican |
| Popular vote | 120,750 | 35,932 |
| Percentage | 75.8% | 22.6% |
- County results Farr: 60–70% 70–80% 80–90%
U.S. Representative before election
Sam Farr
Democratic
Elected U.S. Representative
Sam Farr
Democratic

=== Predictions ===
| Source | Ranking | As of |
|---|---|---|
| The Cook Political Report | Safe D | November 6, 2006 |
| Rothenberg | Safe D | November 6, 2006 |
| Sabato's Crystal Ball | Safe D | November 6, 2006 |
| Real Clear Politics | Safe D | November 7, 2006 |
| CQ Politics | Safe D | November 7, 2006 |

=== Results ===
California's 17th congressional district election, 2006
| Party | Candidate | Votes | % |
|---|---|---|---|
| Democratic | Sam Farr (incumbent) | 120,750 | 75.80 |
| Republican | Anthony De Maio | 35,932 | 22.56 |
| Independent | Jeff Taylor (write-in) | 2,611 | 1.64 |
| Total votes | | 159,293 | 100.00 |
| Turnout | | | |
| Democratic hold | | | |

== District 18 ==
2006 California's 18th congressional district election
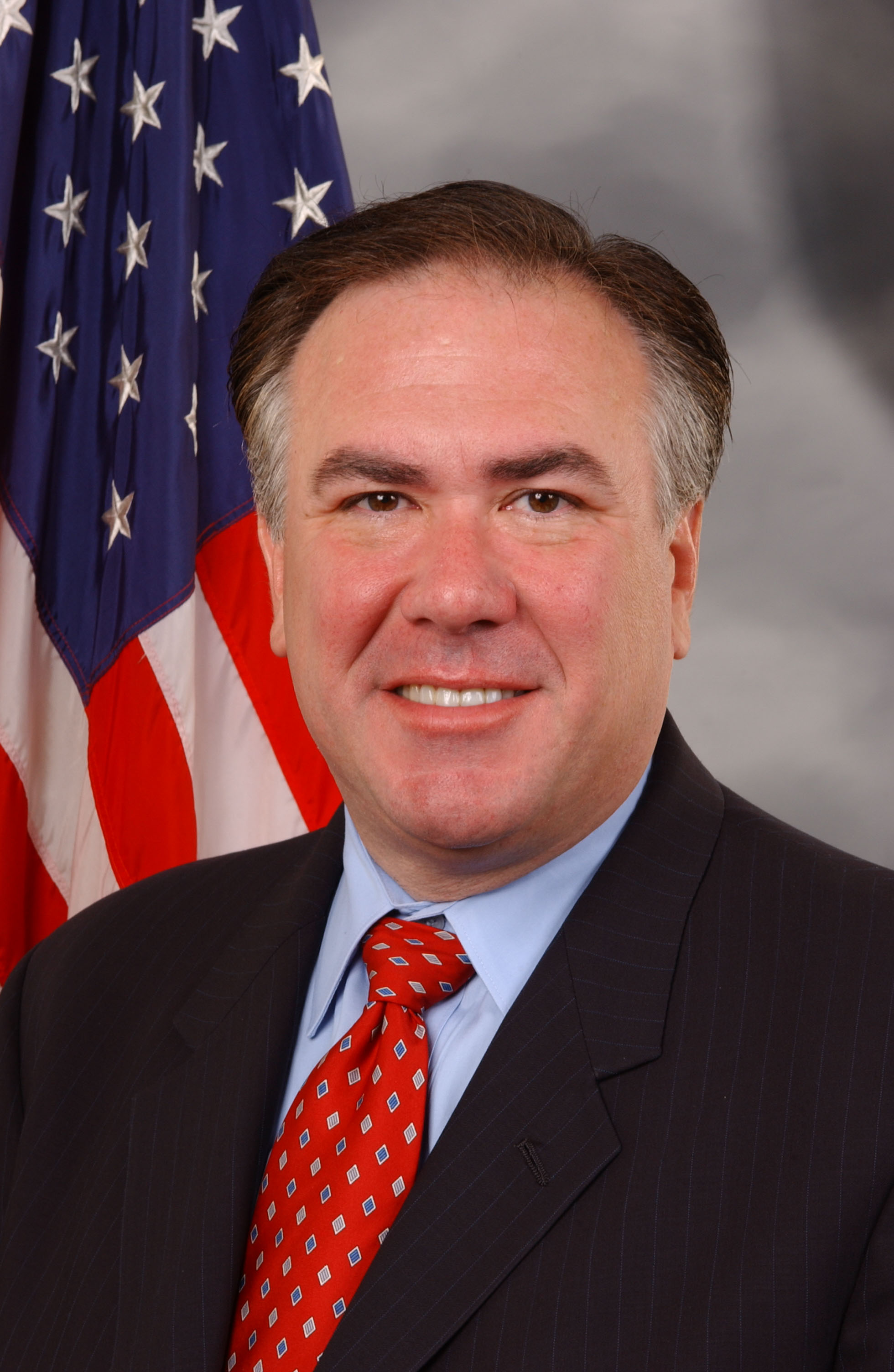

| Nominee | Dennis Cardoza | John Kanno |
| Party | Democratic | Republican |
| Popular vote | 71,182 | 37,531 |
| Percentage | 65.5% | 34.5% |
- County results Cardoza: 60–70% 70–80% Kanno: 50–60%
U.S. Representative before election
Dennis Cardoza
Democratic
Elected U.S. Representative
Dennis Cardoza
Democratic

=== Predictions ===
| Source | Ranking | As of |
|---|---|---|
| The Cook Political Report | Safe D | November 6, 2006 |
| Rothenberg | Safe D | November 6, 2006 |
| Sabato's Crystal Ball | Safe D | November 6, 2006 |
| Real Clear Politics | Safe D | November 7, 2006 |
| CQ Politics | Safe D | November 7, 2006 |

=== Results ===
California's 18th congressional district election, 2006
| Party | Candidate | Votes | % |
|---|---|---|---|
| Democratic | Dennis Cardoza (incumbent) | 71,182 | 65.48 |
| Republican | John Kanno | 37,531 | 34.52 |
| Total votes | | 108,713 | 100.00 |
| Turnout | | | |
| Democratic hold | | | |

== District 19 ==
2006 California's 19th congressional district election
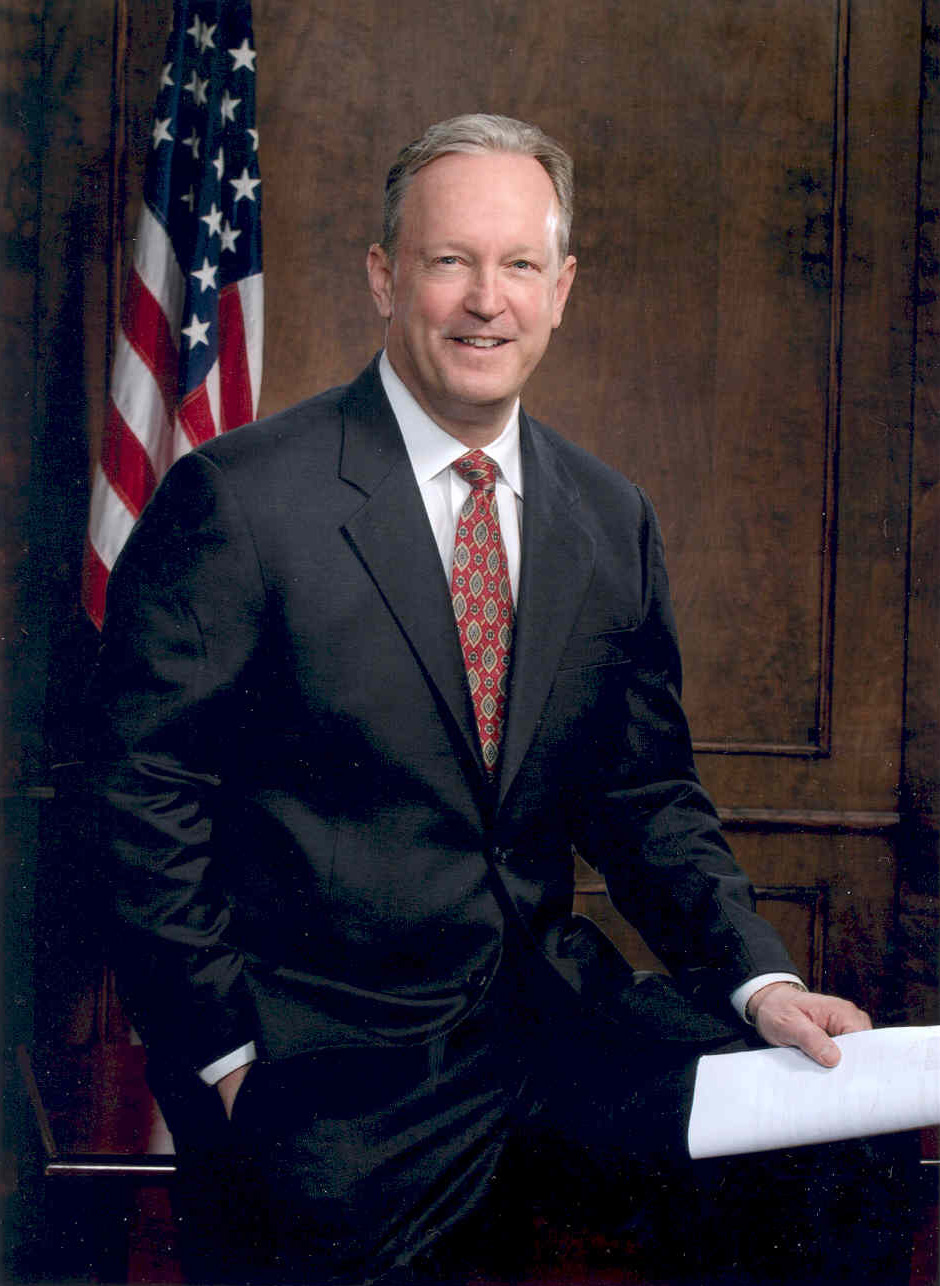

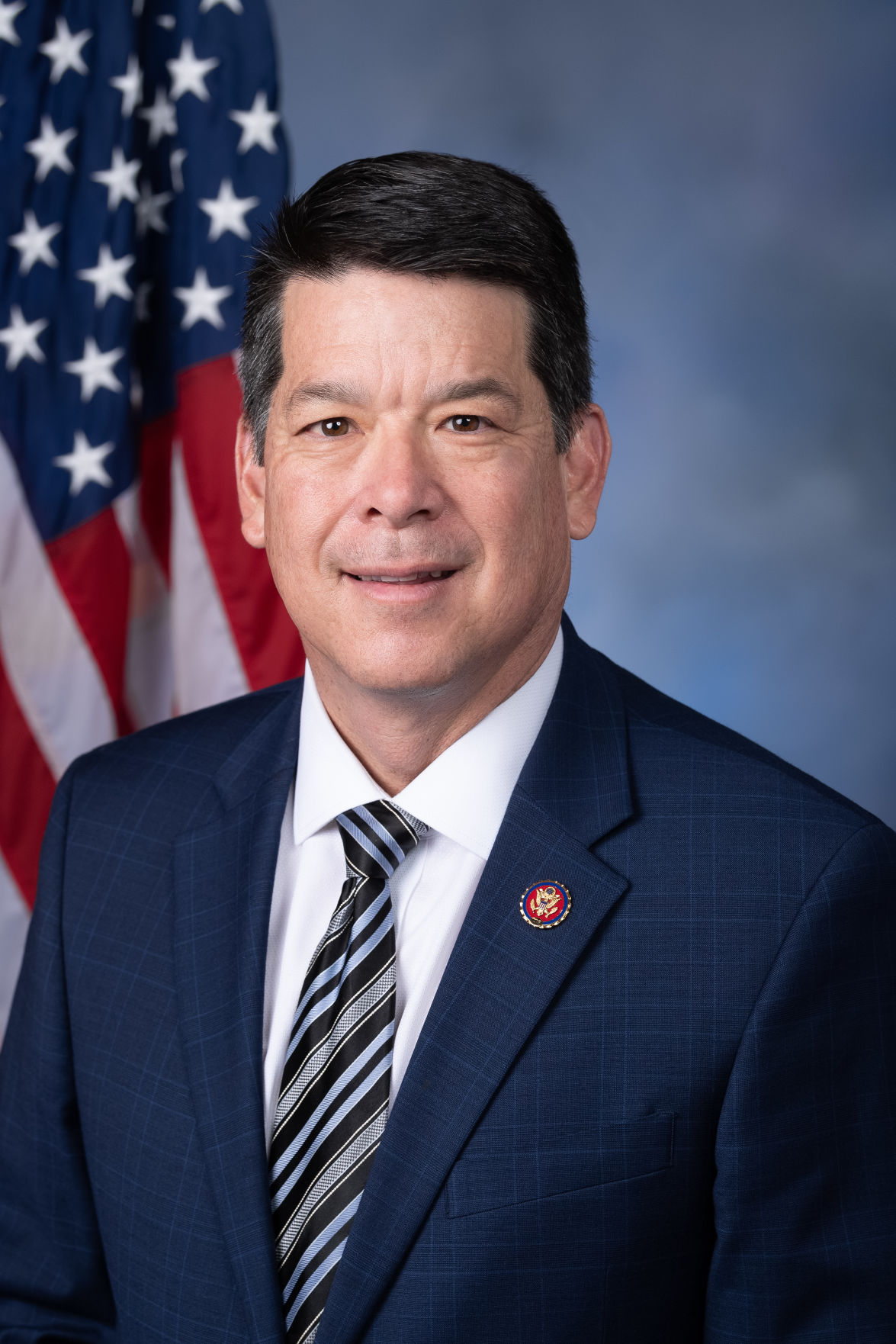
| Nominee | George Radanovich | TJ Cox |
| Party | Republican | Democratic |
| Popular vote | 110,246 | 71,748 |
| Percentage | 60.6% | 39.4% |
- County results Radanovich: 50–60% 60–70%
U.S. Representative before election
George Radanovich
Republican
Elected U.S. Representative
George Radanovich
Republican

=== Predictions ===
| Source | Ranking | As of |
|---|---|---|
| The Cook Political Report | Safe R | November 6, 2006 |
| Rothenberg | Safe R | November 6, 2006 |
| Sabato's Crystal Ball | Safe R | November 6, 2006 |
| Real Clear Politics | Safe R | November 7, 2006 |
| CQ Politics | Safe R | November 7, 2006 |

=== Results ===
California's 19th congressional district election, 2006
| Party | Candidate | Votes | % |
|---|---|---|---|
| Republican | George Radanovich (incumbent) | 110,246 | 60.58 |
| Democratic | TJ Cox | 71,748 | 39.42 |
| Total votes | | 181,994 | 100.00 |
| Republican hold | | | |

== District 20 ==
2006 California's 20th congressional district election
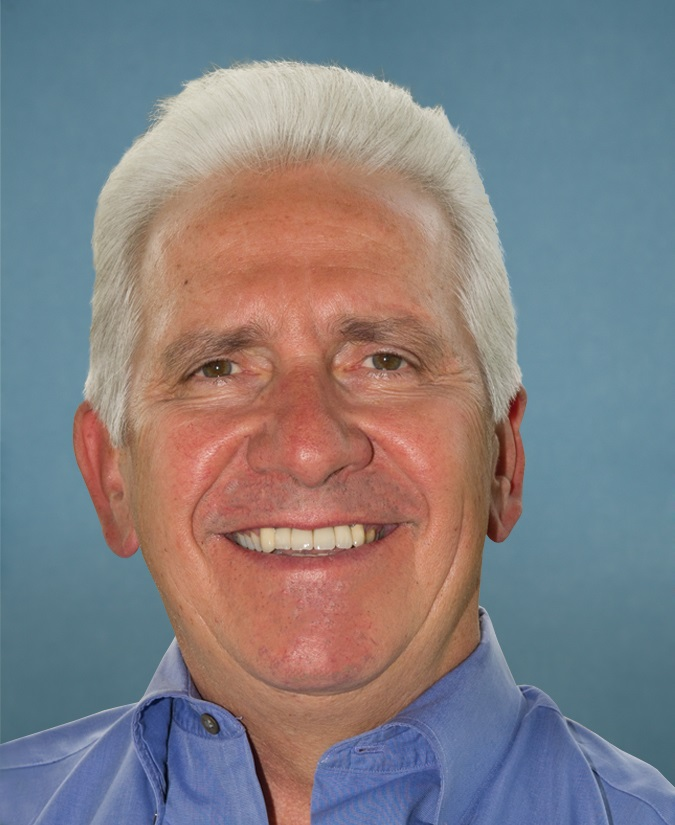
| Nominee | Jim Costa |
| Party | Democratic |
| Popular vote | 61,120 |
| Percentage | 100.0% |
U.S. Representative before election
Jim Costa
Democratic
Elected U.S. Representative
Jim Costa
Democratic

=== Predictions ===
| Source | Ranking | As of |
|---|---|---|
| The Cook Political Report | Safe D | November 6, 2006 |
| Rothenberg | Safe D | November 6, 2006 |
| Sabato's Crystal Ball | Safe D | November 6, 2006 |
| Real Clear Politics | Safe D | November 7, 2006 |
| CQ Politics | Safe D | November 7, 2006 |

=== Results ===
California's 20th congressional district election, 2006
| Party | Candidate | Votes | % |
|---|---|---|---|
| Democratic | Jim Costa (incumbent) | 61,120 | 100.00 |
| Total votes | | 61,120 | 100.00 |
| Turnout | | | |
| Democratic hold | | | |

== District 21 ==
2006 California's 21st congressional district election
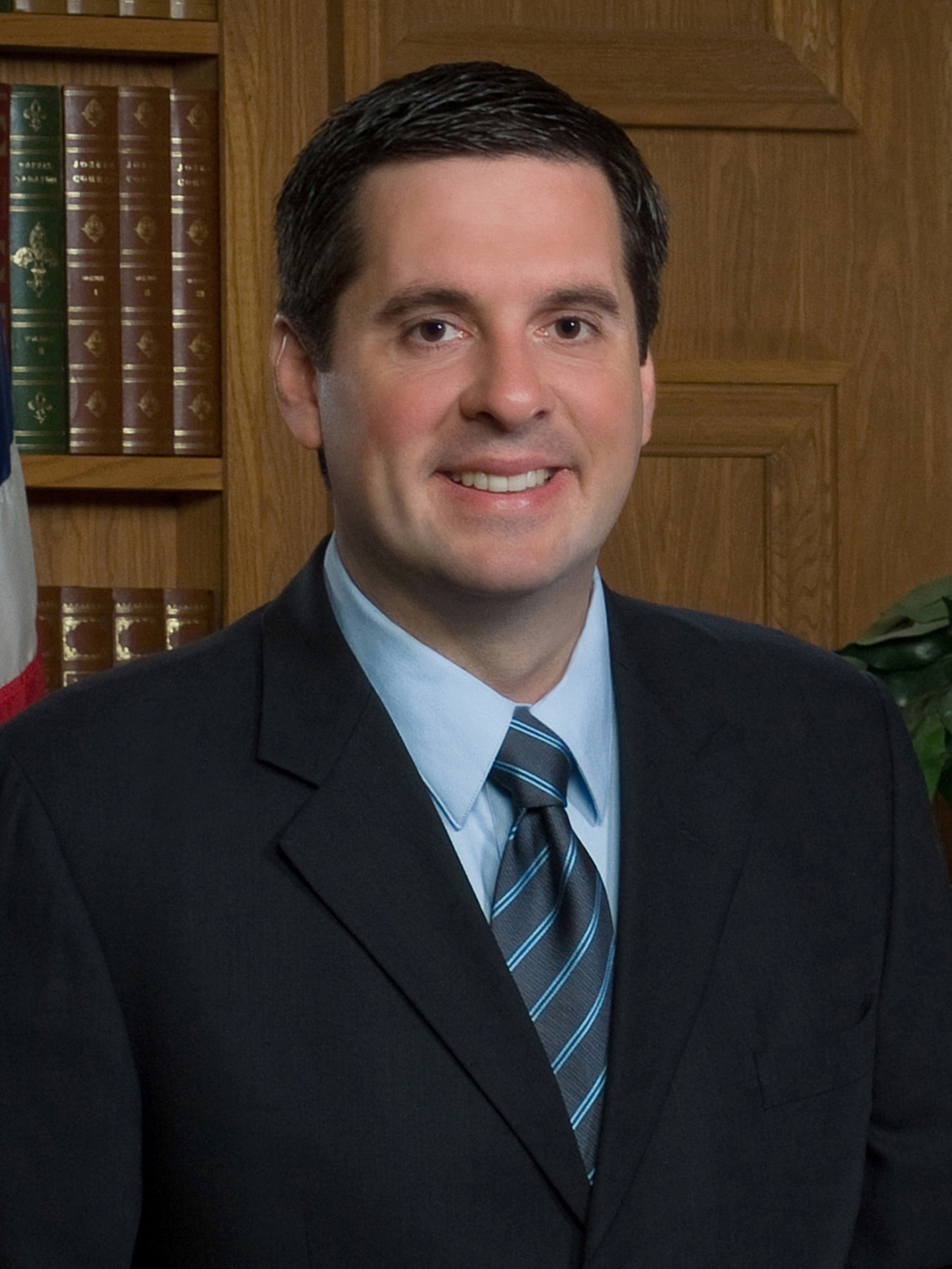

| Nominee | Devin Nunes | Steven Haze |
| Party | Republican | Democratic |
| Popular vote | 95,214 | 42,718 |
| Percentage | 66.7% | 29.9% |
- County results Nunes: 60–70%
U.S. Representative before election
Devin Nunes
Republican
Elected U.S. Representative
Devin Nunes
Republican

=== Predictions ===
| Source | Ranking | As of |
|---|---|---|
| The Cook Political Report | Safe R | November 6, 2006 |
| Rothenberg | Safe R | November 6, 2006 |
| Sabato's Crystal Ball | Safe R | November 6, 2006 |
| Real Clear Politics | Safe R | November 7, 2006 |
| CQ Politics | Safe R | November 7, 2006 |

=== Results ===
California's 21st congressional district election, 2006
| Party | Candidate | Votes | % |
|---|---|---|---|
| Republican | Devin Nunes (incumbent) | 95,214 | 66.74 |
| Democratic | Steven Haze | 42,718 | 29.94 |
| Green | John Miller | 4,729 | 3.31 |
| Total votes | | 142,661 | 100.00 |
| Turnout | | | |
| Republican hold | | | |

== District 22 ==
2006 California's 22nd congressional district election
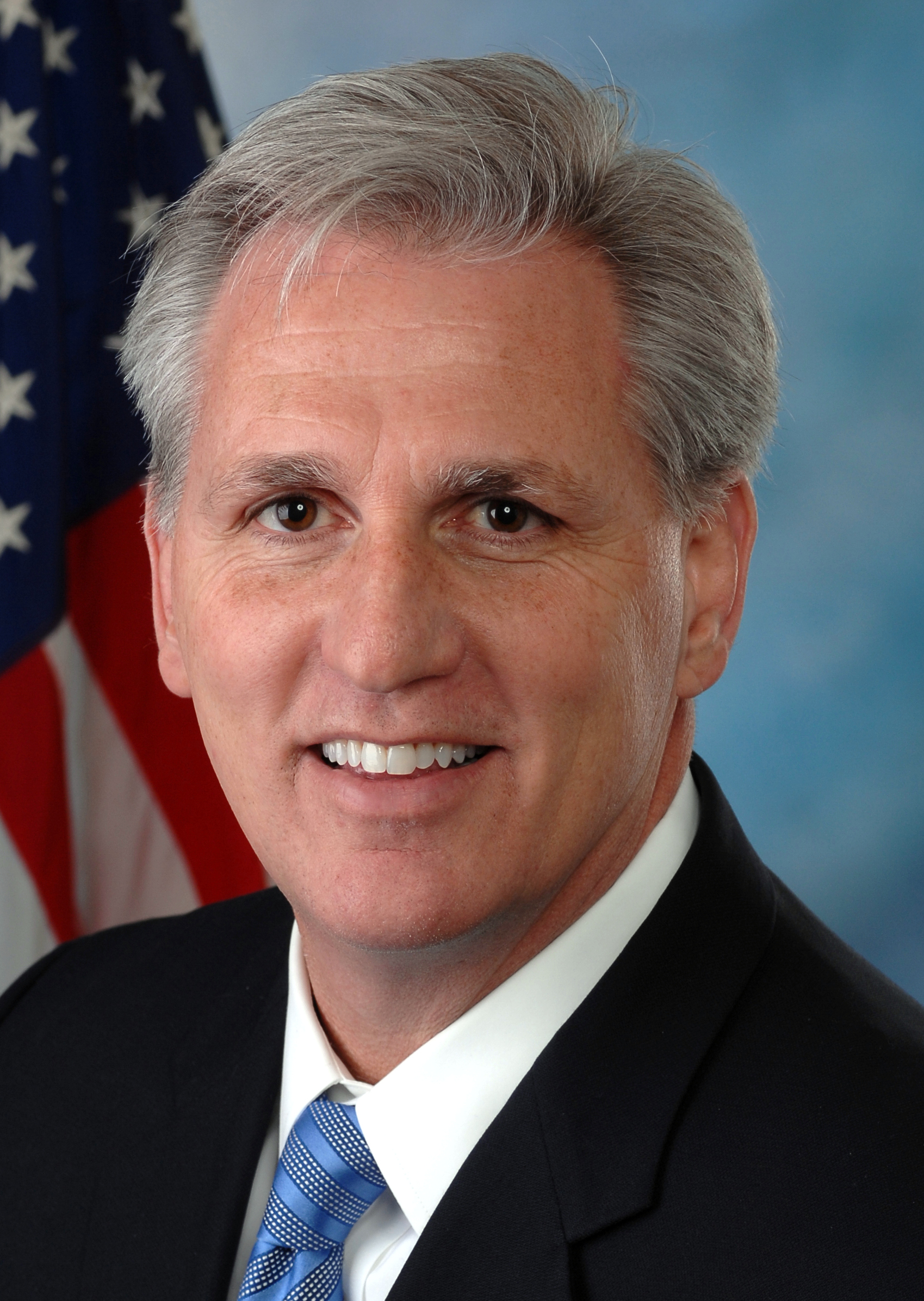

| Nominee | Kevin McCarthy | Sharon Beery |
| Party | Republican | Democratic |
| Popular vote | 133,278 | 55,226 |
| Percentage | 70.7% | 29.3% |
- County results Carthy: 60–70% 70–80%
U.S. Representative before election
Bill Thomas
Republican
Elected U.S. Representative
Kevin McCarthy
Republican

=== Predictions ===
| Source | Ranking | As of |
|---|---|---|
| The Cook Political Report | Safe R | November 6, 2006 |
| Rothenberg | Safe R | November 6, 2006 |
| Sabato's Crystal Ball | Safe R | November 6, 2006 |
| Real Clear Politics | Safe R | November 7, 2006 |
| CQ Politics | Safe R | November 7, 2006 |

=== Results ===
California's 22nd congressional district election, 2006
| Party | Candidate | Votes | % |
|---|---|---|---|
| Republican | Kevin McCarthy | 133,278 | 70.70 |
| Democratic | Sharon Beery | 55,226 | 29.30 |
| Total votes | | 188,504 | 100.00 |
| Turnout | | | |
| Republican hold | | | |

== District 23 ==
2006 California's 23rd congressional district election
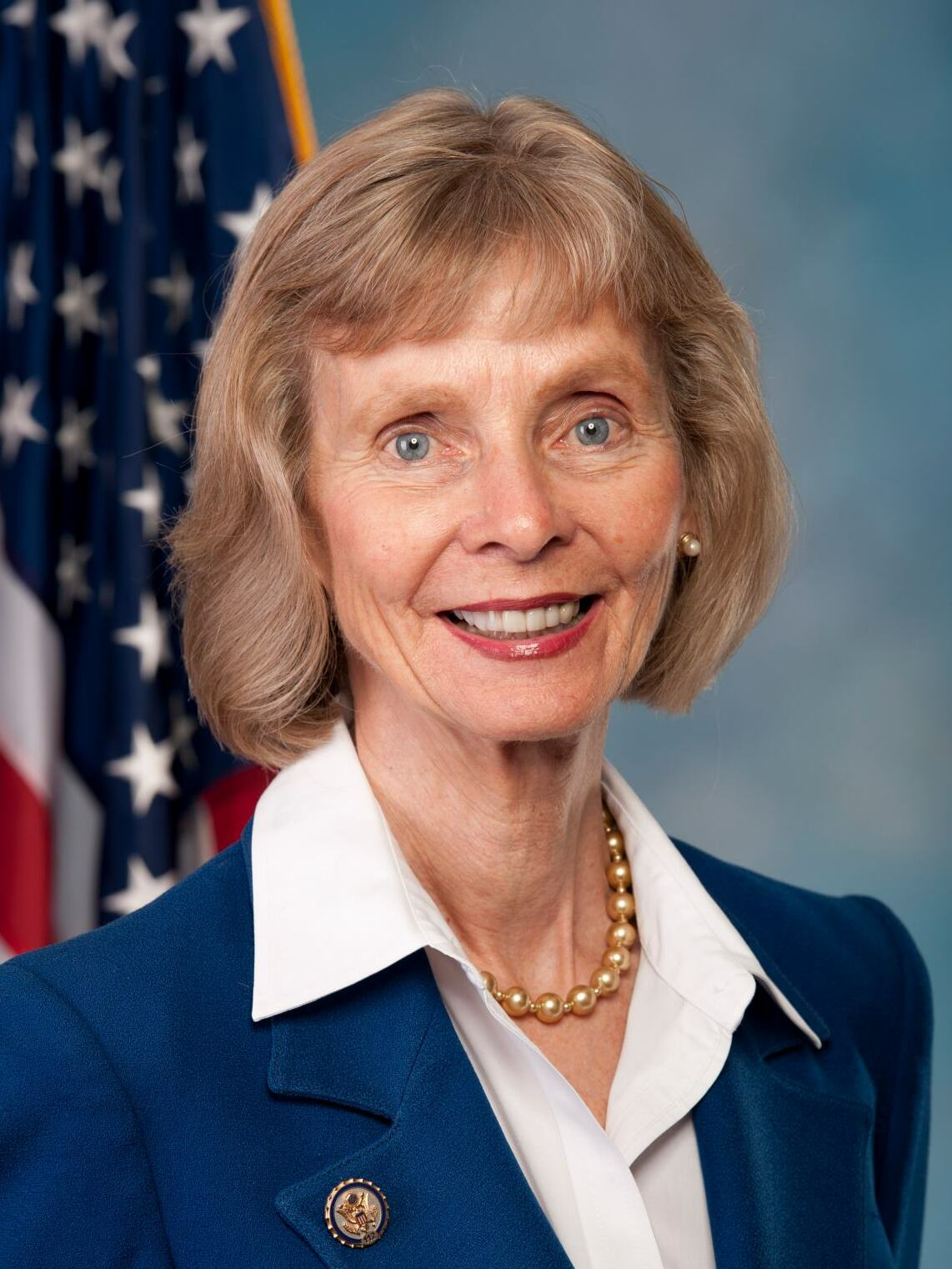

| Nominee | Lois Capps | Victor Tognazzini |
| Party | Democratic | Republican |
| Popular vote | 114,661 | 61,272 |
| Percentage | 65.2% | 34.8% |
- County results Capps: 60–70%
U.S. Representative before election
Lois Capps
Democratic
Elected U.S. Representative
Lois Capps
Democratic

=== Predictions ===
| Source | Ranking | As of |
|---|---|---|
| The Cook Political Report | Safe D | November 6, 2006 |
| Rothenberg | Safe D | November 6, 2006 |
| Sabato's Crystal Ball | Safe D | November 6, 2006 |
| Real Clear Politics | Safe D | November 7, 2006 |
| CQ Politics | Safe D | November 7, 2006 |

=== Results ===
California's 23rd congressional district election, 2006
| Party | Candidate | Votes | % |
|---|---|---|---|
| Democratic | Lois Capps (incumbent) | 114,661 | 65.17 |
| Republican | Victor Tognazzini | 61,272 | 34.82 |
| Independent | H. A. Gardner (write-in) | 18 | 0.01 |
| Total votes | | 175,951 | 100.00 |
| Turnout | | | |
| Democratic hold | | | |

== District 24 ==
2006 California's 24th congressional district election
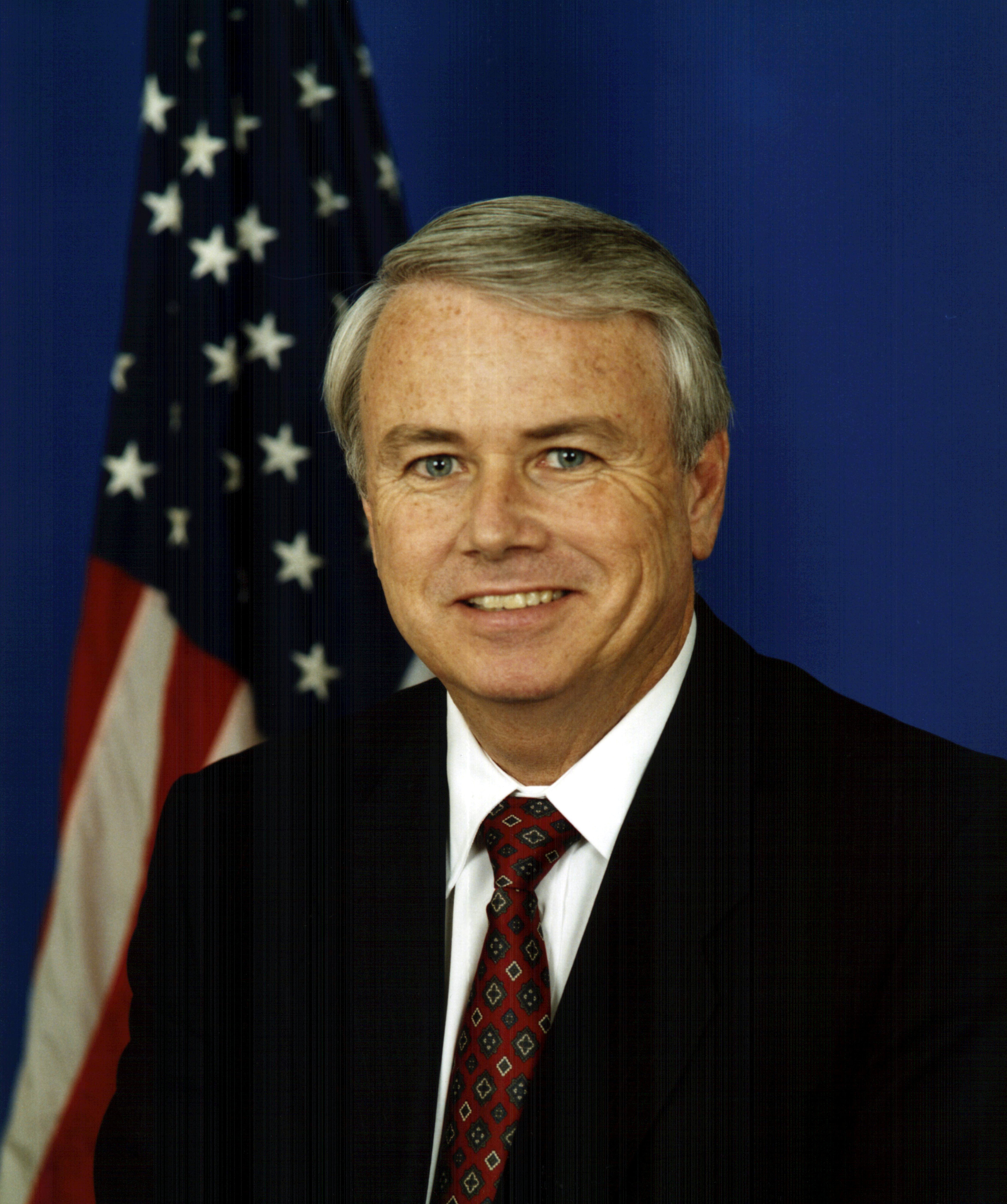

| Nominee | Elton Gallegly | Jill Martinez |
| Party | Republican | Democratic |
| Popular vote | 129,812 | 79,461 |
| Percentage | 62.0% | 38.0% |
- County results Gallegly: 60–70%
U.S. Representative before election
Elton Gallegly
Republican
Elected U.S. Representative
Elton Gallegly
Republican

=== Predictions ===
| Source | Ranking | As of |
|---|---|---|
| The Cook Political Report | Safe R | November 6, 2006 |
| Rothenberg | Safe R | November 6, 2006 |
| Sabato's Crystal Ball | Safe R | November 6, 2006 |
| Real Clear Politics | Safe R | November 7, 2006 |
| CQ Politics | Safe R | November 7, 2006 |

=== Results ===
California's 24th congressional district election, 2006
| Party | Candidate | Votes | % |
|---|---|---|---|
| Republican | Elton Gallegly (incumbent) | 129,812 | 62.02 |
| Democratic | Jill Martinez | 79,461 | 37.97 |
| Independent | Michael Stettler (write-in) | 16 | 0.01 |
| Independent | Henry Nicolle (write-in) | 3 | 0.00 |
| Total votes | | 209,292 | 100.00 |
| Turnout | | | |
| Republican hold | | | |

== District 25 ==
2006 California's 25th congressional district election
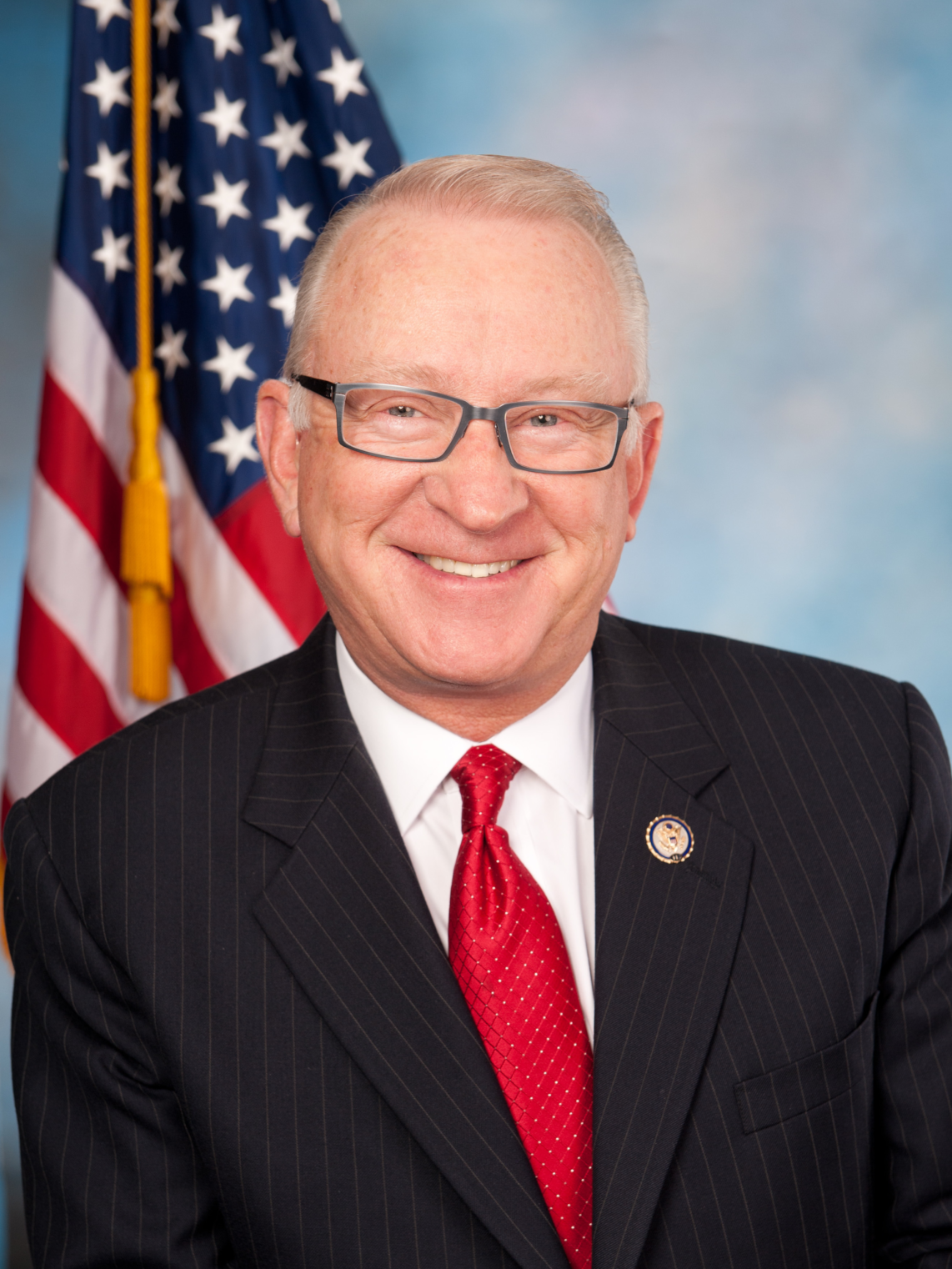

| Nominee | Howard McKeon | Robert Rodriguez |
| Party | Republican | Democratic |
| Popular vote | 93,987 | 55,913 |
| Percentage | 60.0% | 35.7% |
- County results Mckeon: 50–60% 60–70%
U.S. Representative before election
Howard McKeon
Republican
Elected U.S. Representative
Howard McKeon
Republican

=== Predictions ===
| Source | Ranking | As of |
|---|---|---|
| The Cook Political Report | Safe R | November 6, 2006 |
| Rothenberg | Safe R | November 6, 2006 |
| Sabato's Crystal Ball | Safe R | November 6, 2006 |
| Real Clear Politics | Safe R | November 7, 2006 |
| CQ Politics | Safe R | November 7, 2006 |

=== Results ===
California's 25th congressional district election, 2006
| Party | Candidate | Votes | % |
|---|---|---|---|
| Republican | Howard McKeon (incumbent) | 93,987 | 59.95 |
| Democratic | Robert Rodriguez | 55,913 | 35.66 |
| Libertarian | David Erickson | 6,873 | 4.38 |
| Total votes | | 156,773 | 100.00 |
| Turnout | | | |
| Republican hold | | | |

== District 26 ==
2006 California's 26th congressional district election
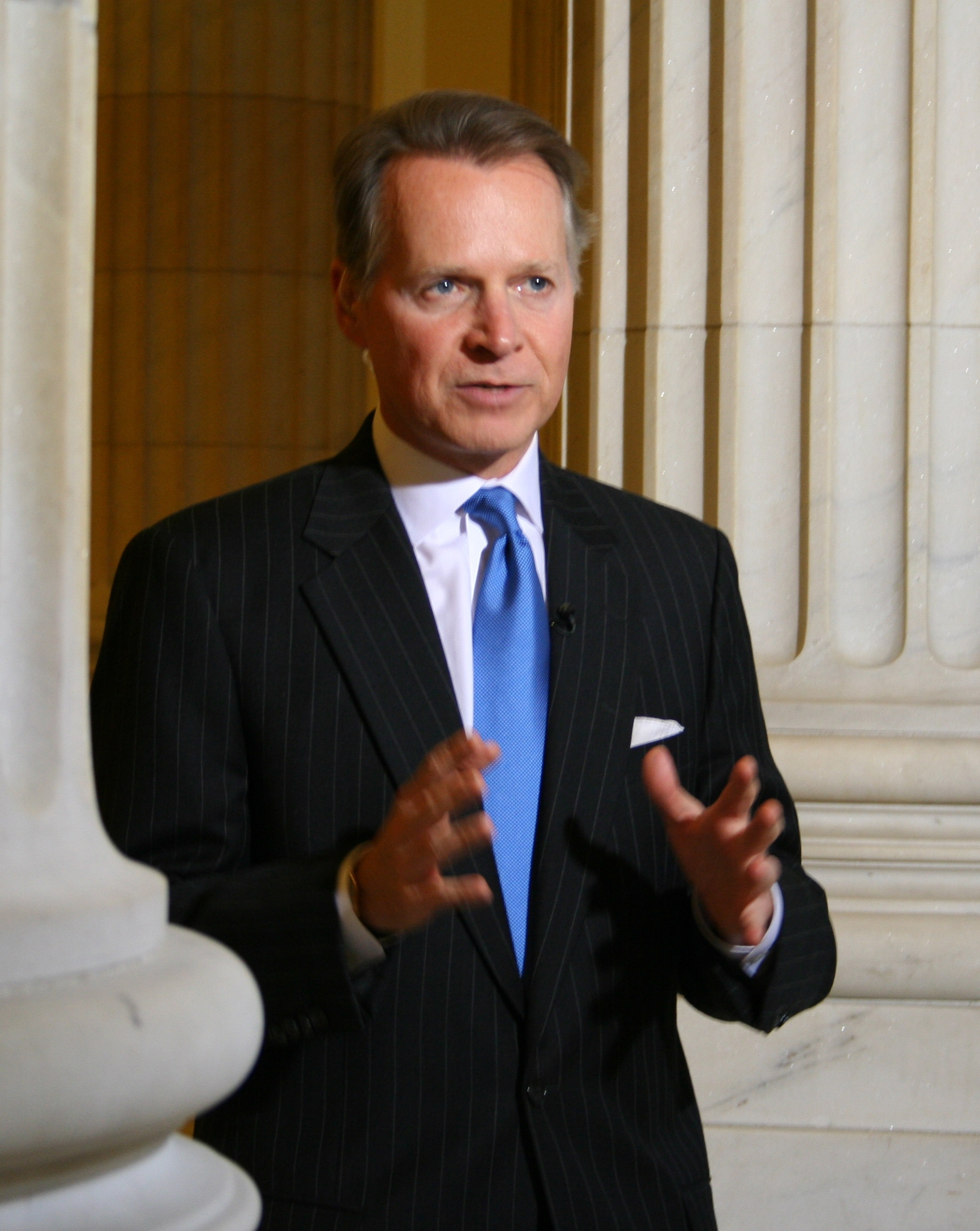

| Nominee | David Dreier | Cynthia Matthews |
| Party | Republican | Democratic |
| Popular vote | 102,028 | 67,878 |
| Percentage | 57.0% | 37.9% |
- County results Dreier: 50–60%
U.S. Representative before election
David Dreier
Republican
Elected U.S. Representative
David Dreier
Republican

=== Predictions ===
| Source | Ranking | As of |
|---|---|---|
| The Cook Political Report | Safe R | November 6, 2006 |
| Rothenberg | Safe R | November 6, 2006 |
| Sabato's Crystal Ball | Safe R | November 6, 2006 |
| Real Clear Politics | Safe R | November 7, 2006 |
| CQ Politics | Safe R | November 7, 2006 |

=== Results ===
California's 26th congressional district election, 2006
| Party | Candidate | Votes | % |
|---|---|---|---|
| Republican | David Dreier (incumbent) | 102,028 | 56.95 |
| Democratic | Cynthia Matthews | 67,878 | 37.89 |
| Libertarian | Ted Brown | 5,887 | 3.29 |
| American Independent | Elliott Graham | 3,351 | 1.87 |
| Total votes | | 179,144 | 100.00 |
| Turnout | | | |
| Republican hold | | | |

== District 27 ==
2006 California's 27th congressional district election
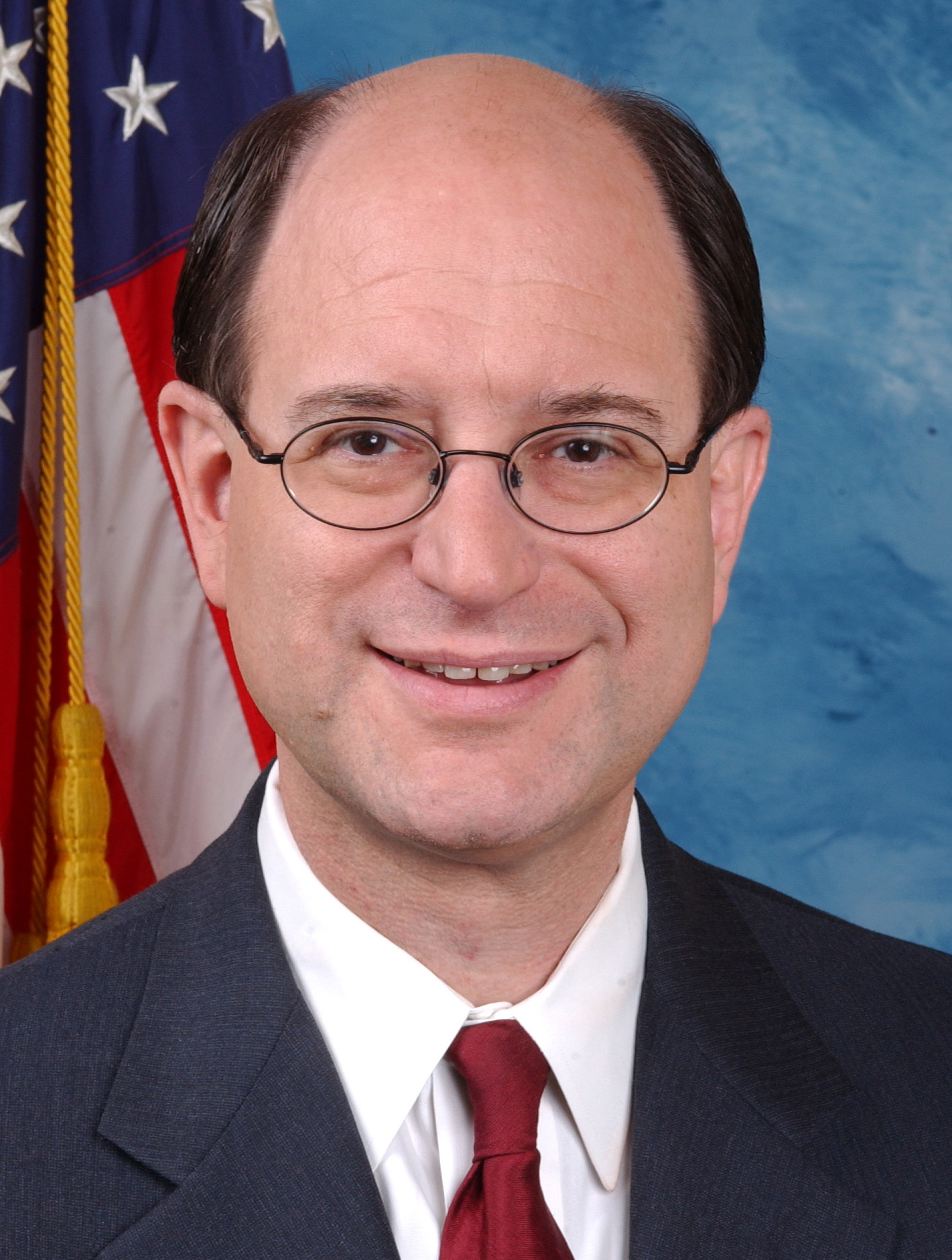

| Nominee | Brad Sherman | Peter Hankwitz |
| Party | Democratic | Republican |
| Popular vote | 92,650 | 42,074 |
| Percentage | 68.8% | 31.2% |
- County results Sherman: 60–70%
U.S. Representative before election
Brad Sherman
Democratic
Elected U.S. Representative
Brad Sherman
Democratic

=== Predictions ===
| Source | Ranking | As of |
|---|---|---|
| The Cook Political Report | Safe D | November 6, 2006 |
| Rothenberg | Safe D | November 6, 2006 |
| Sabato's Crystal Ball | Safe D | November 6, 2006 |
| Real Clear Politics | Safe D | November 7, 2006 |
| CQ Politics | Safe D | November 7, 2006 |

=== Results ===
California's 27th congressional district election, 2006
| Party | Candidate | Votes | % |
|---|---|---|---|
| Democratic | Brad Sherman (incumbent) | 92,650 | 68.77 |
| Republican | Peter Hankwitz | 42,074 | 31.23 |
| Total votes | | 134,724 | 100.00 |
| Turnout | | | |
| Democratic hold | | | |

== District 28 ==
2006 California's 28th congressional district election
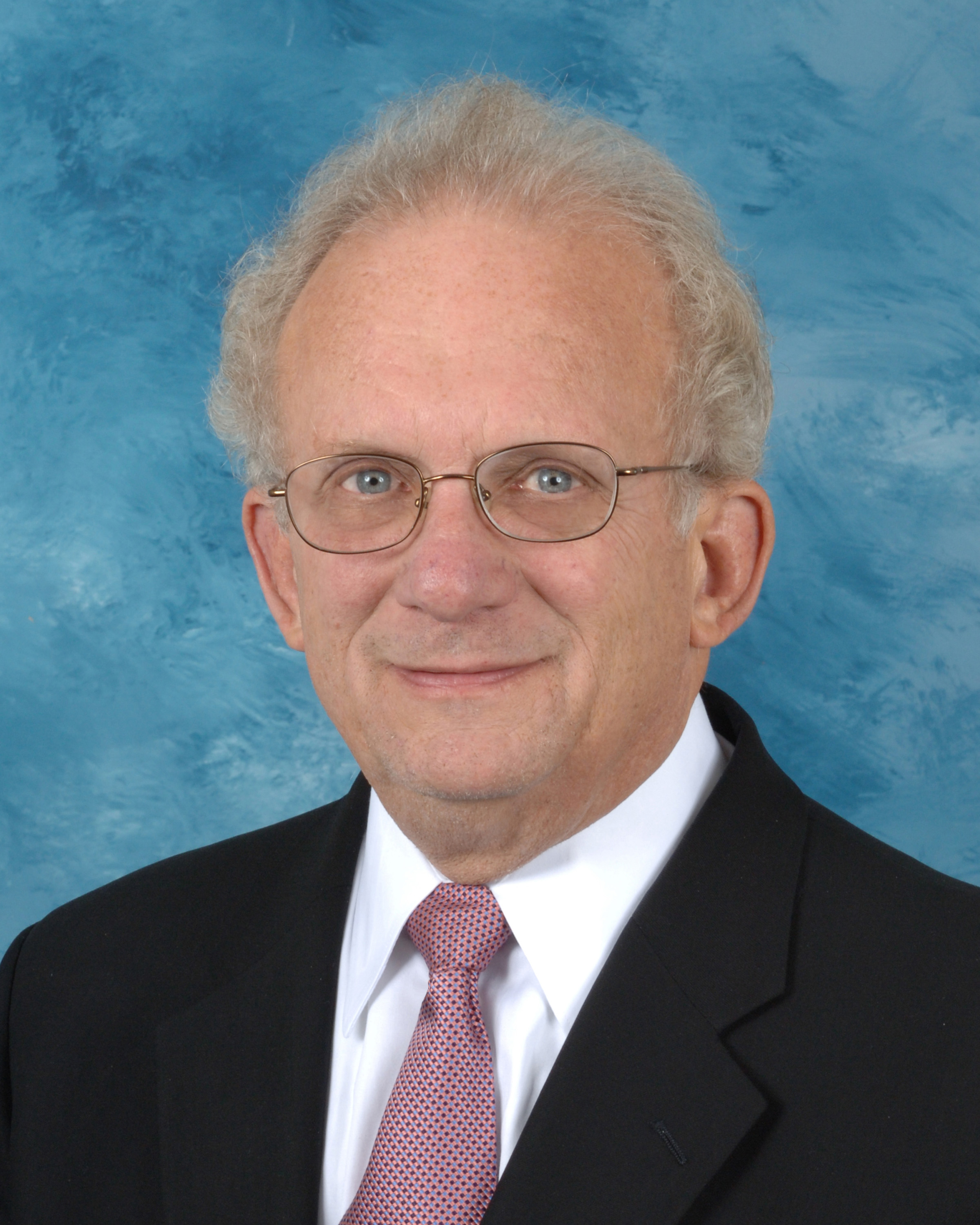

| Nominee | Howard Berman | Stanley Kesselman |
| Party | Democratic | Republican |
| Popular vote | 79,866 | 20,629 |
| Percentage | 73.9% | 19.1% |
- County results Berman: 70–80%
U.S. Representative before election
Howard Berman
Democratic
Elected U.S. Representative
Howard Berman
Democratic

=== Predictions ===
| Source | Ranking | As of |
|---|---|---|
| The Cook Political Report | Safe D | November 6, 2006 |
| Rothenberg | Safe D | November 6, 2006 |
| Sabato's Crystal Ball | Safe D | November 6, 2006 |
| Real Clear Politics | Safe D | November 7, 2006 |
| CQ Politics | Safe D | November 7, 2006 |

=== Results ===
California's 28th congressional district election, 2006
| Party | Candidate | Votes | % |
|---|---|---|---|
| Democratic | Howard Berman (incumbent) | 79,866 | 73.92 |
| Republican | Stanley Kesselman | 20,629 | 19.09 |
| Green | Byron De Lear | 3,868 | 3.58 |
| Libertarian | Kelley Ross | 3,679 | 3.41 |
| Total votes | | 108,042 | 100.00 |
| Turnout | | | |
| Democratic hold | | | |

== District 29 ==
2006 California's 29th congressional district election
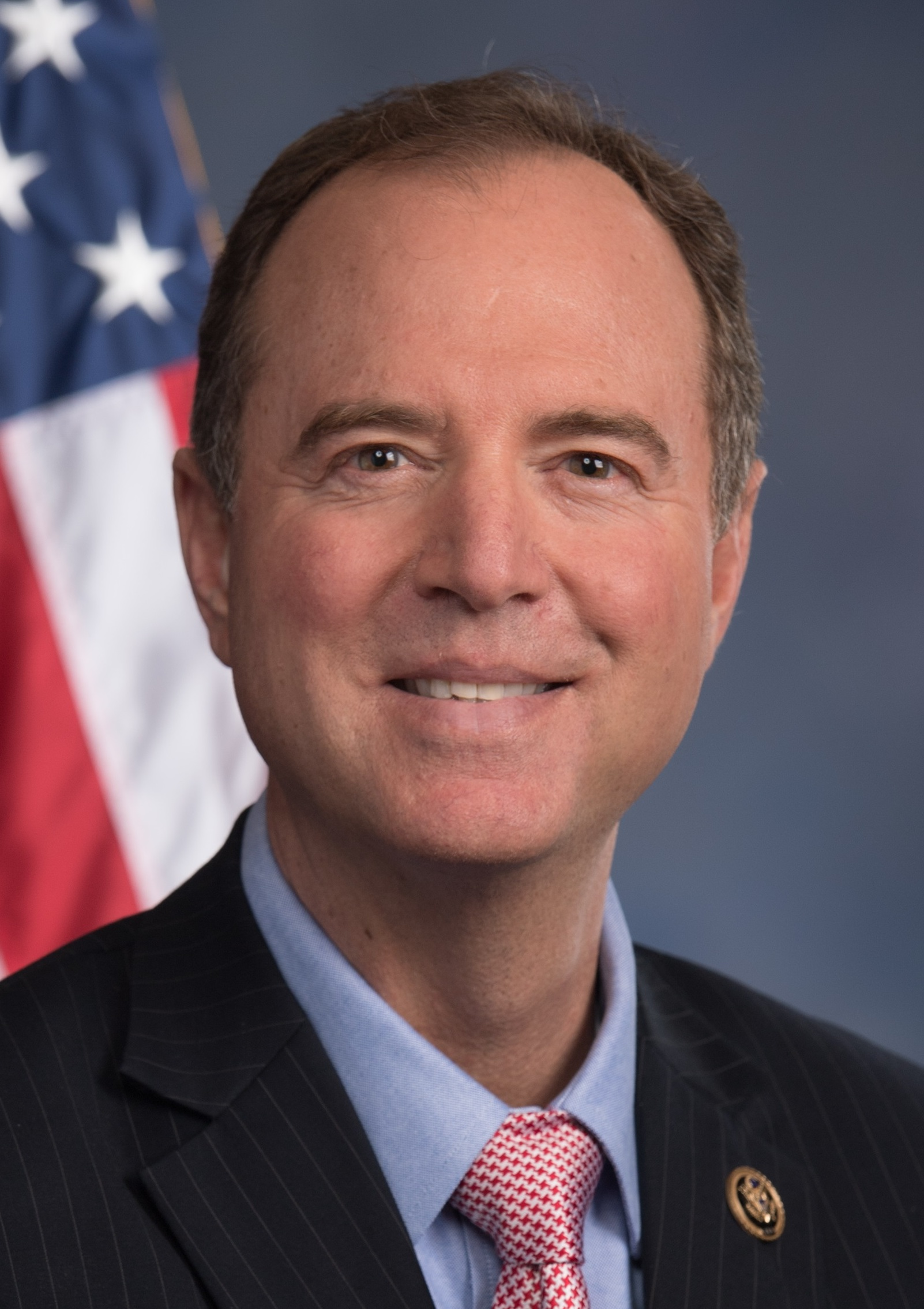

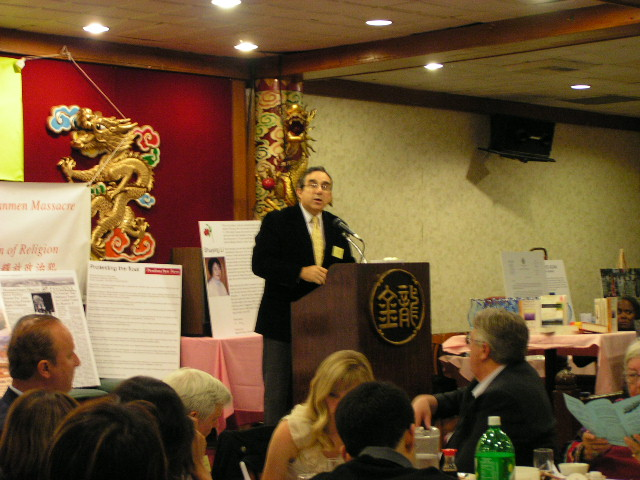
| Nominee | Adam Schiff | William Bodell | William Paparian |
| Party | Democratic | Republican | Green |
| Popular vote | 91,014 | 39,321 | 8,197 |
| Percentage | 63.5% | 27.4% | 5.7% |
- County results Schiff: 60–70%
U.S. Representative before election
Adam Schiff
Democratic
Elected U.S. Representative
Adam Schiff
Democratic

=== Predictions ===
| Source | Ranking | As of |
|---|---|---|
| The Cook Political Report | Safe D | November 6, 2006 |
| Rothenberg | Safe D | November 6, 2006 |
| Sabato's Crystal Ball | Safe D | November 6, 2006 |
| Real Clear Politics | Safe D | November 7, 2006 |
| CQ Politics | Safe D | November 7, 2006 |

=== Results ===
California's 29th congressional district election, 2006
| Party | Candidate | Votes | % |
|---|---|---|---|
| Democratic | Adam Schiff (incumbent) | 91,014 | 63.47 |
| Republican | William Bodell | 39,321 | 27.42 |
| Green | William Paparian | 8,197 | 5.72 |
| Peace and Freedom | Lynda Llamas | 2,599 | 1.81 |
| Libertarian | Jim Keller | 2,258 | 1.57 |
| Independent | John Burton (write-in) | 15 | 0.01 |
| Total votes | | 143,404 | 100.00 |
| Turnout | | | |
| Democratic hold | | | |

== District 30 ==
2006 California's 30th congressional district election
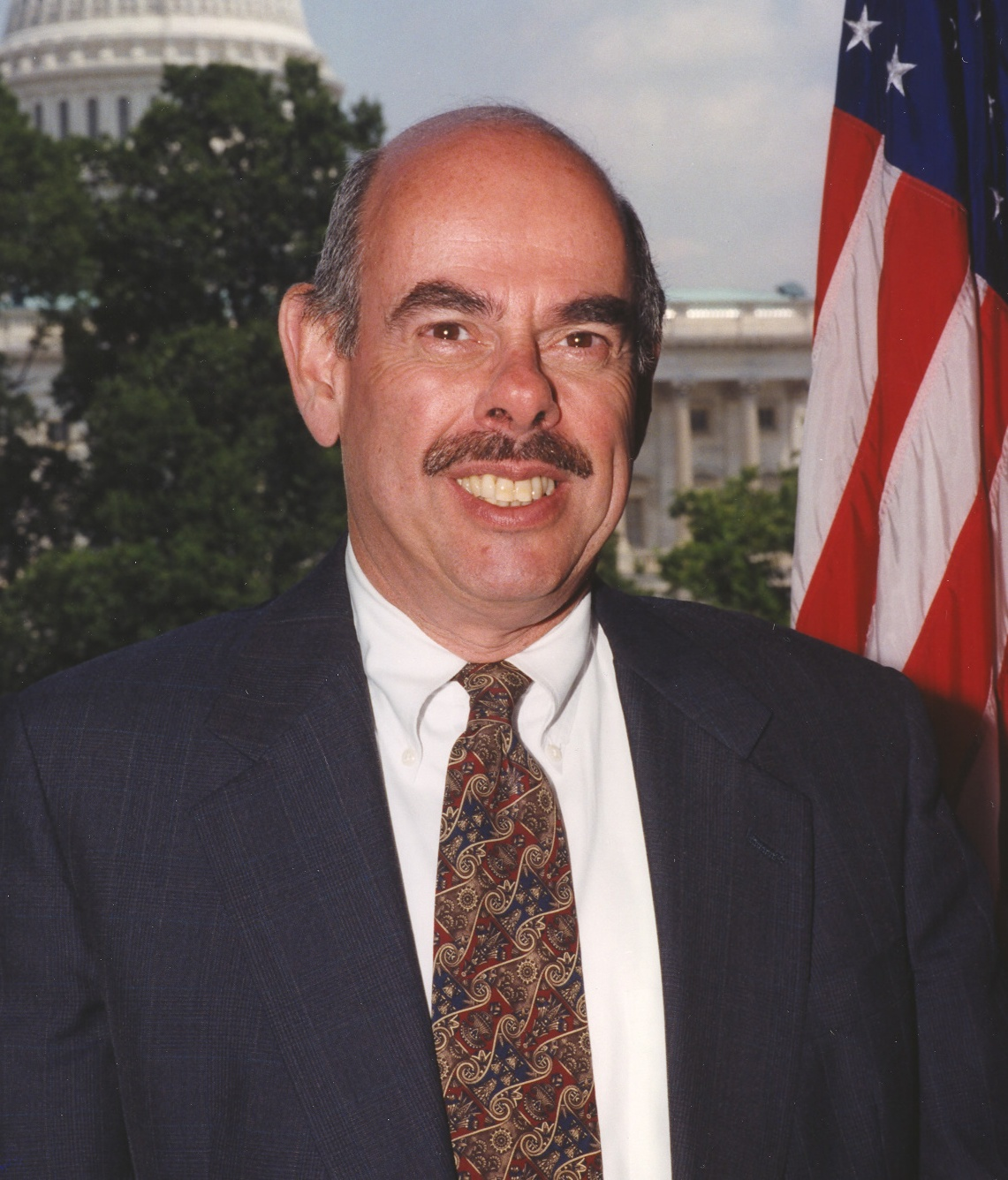

| Nominee | Henry Waxman | David Jones |
| Party | Democratic | Republican |
| Popular vote | 151,284 | 55,904 |
| Percentage | 71.5% | 26.4% |
- County results Waxman: 70–80%
U.S. Representative before election
Henry Waxman
Democratic
Elected U.S. Representative
Henry Waxman
Democratic

=== Predictions ===
| Source | Ranking | As of |
|---|---|---|
| The Cook Political Report | Safe D | November 6, 2006 |
| Rothenberg | Safe D | November 6, 2006 |
| Sabato's Crystal Ball | Safe D | November 6, 2006 |
| Real Clear Politics | Safe D | November 7, 2006 |
| CQ Politics | Safe D | November 7, 2006 |

=== Results ===
California's 30th congressional district election, 2006
| Party | Candidate | Votes | % |
|---|---|---|---|
| Democratic | Henry Waxman (incumbent) | 151,284 | 71.45 |
| Republican | David Jones | 55,904 | 26.40 |
| Peace and Freedom | Adele Cannon | 4,546 | 2.15 |
| Total votes | | 211,734 | 100.00 |
| Turnout | | | |
| Democratic hold | | | |

== District 31 ==
2006 California's 31st congressional district election
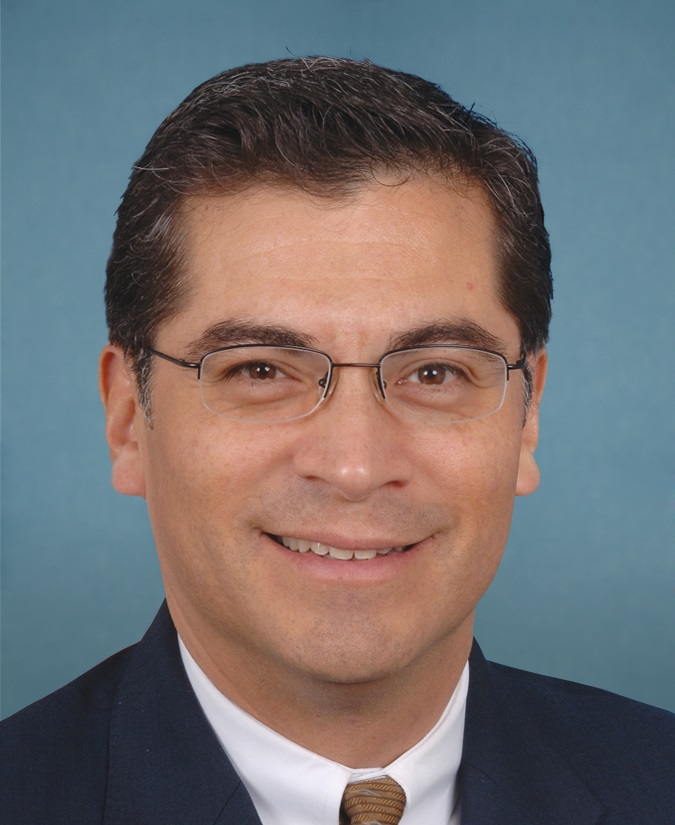
| Nominee | Xavier Becerra |
| Party | Democratic |
| Popular vote | 64,952 |
| Percentage | 100.0% |
U.S. Representative before election
Xavier Becerra
Democratic
Elected U.S. Representative
Xavier Becerra
Democratic

=== Predictions ===
| Source | Ranking | As of |
|---|---|---|
| The Cook Political Report | Safe D | November 6, 2006 |
| Rothenberg | Safe D | November 6, 2006 |
| Sabato's Crystal Ball | Safe D | November 6, 2006 |
| Real Clear Politics | Safe D | November 7, 2006 |
| CQ Politics | Safe D | November 7, 2006 |

=== Results ===
California's 31st congressional district election, 2006
| Party | Candidate | Votes | % |
|---|---|---|---|
| Democratic | Xavier Becerra (incumbent) | 64,952 | 100.00 |
| Total votes | | 64,952 | 100.00 |
| Turnout | | | |
| Democratic hold | | | |

== District 32 ==
2006 California's 32nd congressional district election
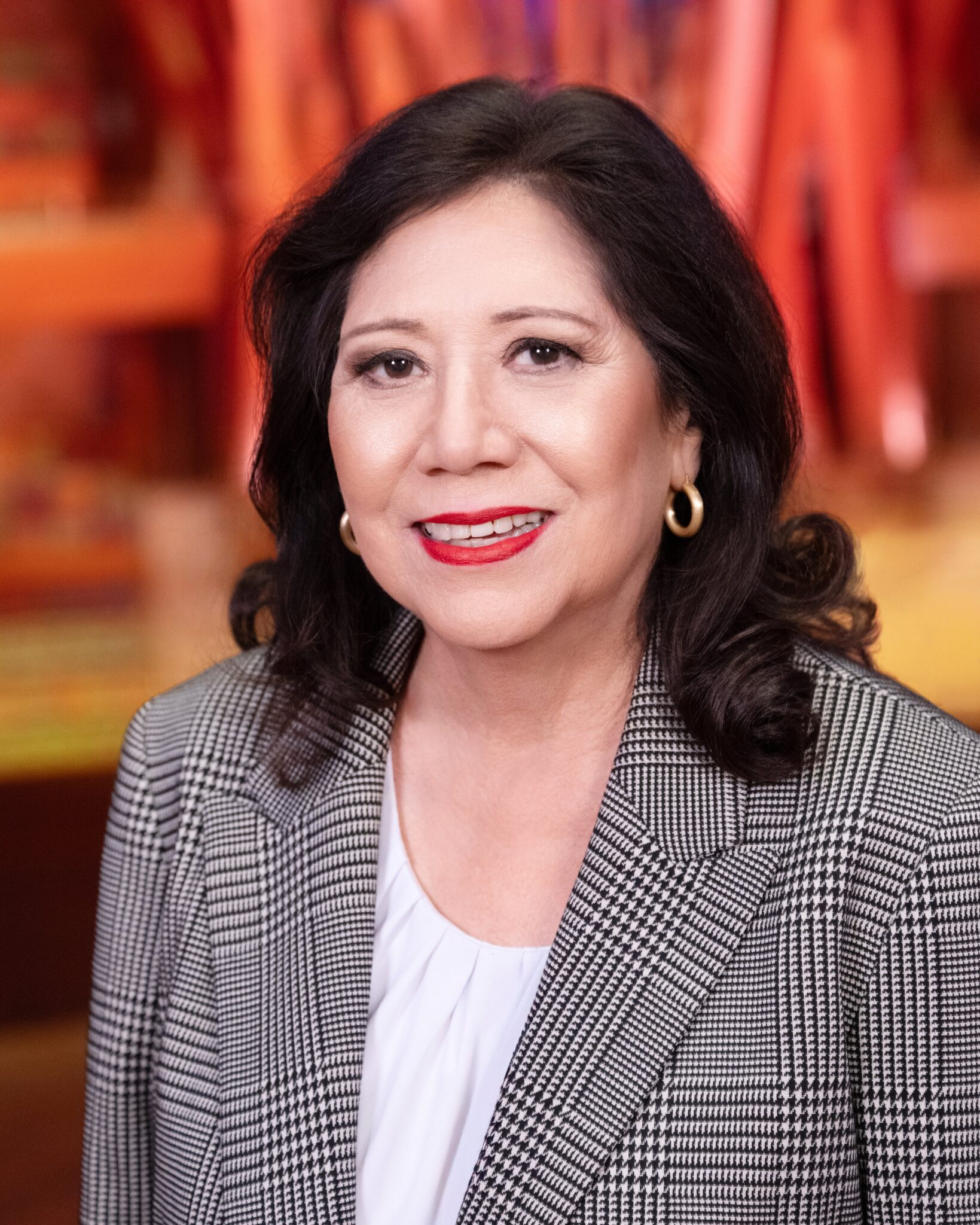

| Nominee | Hilda Solis | Leland Faegre |
| Party | Democratic | Libertarian |
| Popular vote | 76,059 | 15,627 |
| Percentage | 83.0% | 17.0% |
- County results Solis: 80–90%
U.S. Representative before election
Hilda Solis
Democratic
Elected U.S. Representative
Hilda Solis
Democratic

=== Predictions ===
| Source | Ranking | As of |
|---|---|---|
| The Cook Political Report | Safe D | November 6, 2006 |
| Rothenberg | Safe D | November 6, 2006 |
| Sabato's Crystal Ball | Safe D | November 6, 2006 |
| Real Clear Politics | Safe D | November 7, 2006 |
| CQ Politics | Safe D | November 7, 2006 |

=== Results ===
California's 32nd congressional district election, 2006
| Party | Candidate | Votes | % |
|---|---|---|---|
| Democratic | Hilda Solis (incumbent) | 76,059 | 82.96 |
| Libertarian | Leland Faegre | 15,627 | 17.04 |
| Total votes | | 91,686 | 100.00 |
| Turnout | | | |
| Democratic hold | | | |

== District 33 ==
2006 California's 33rd congressional district election
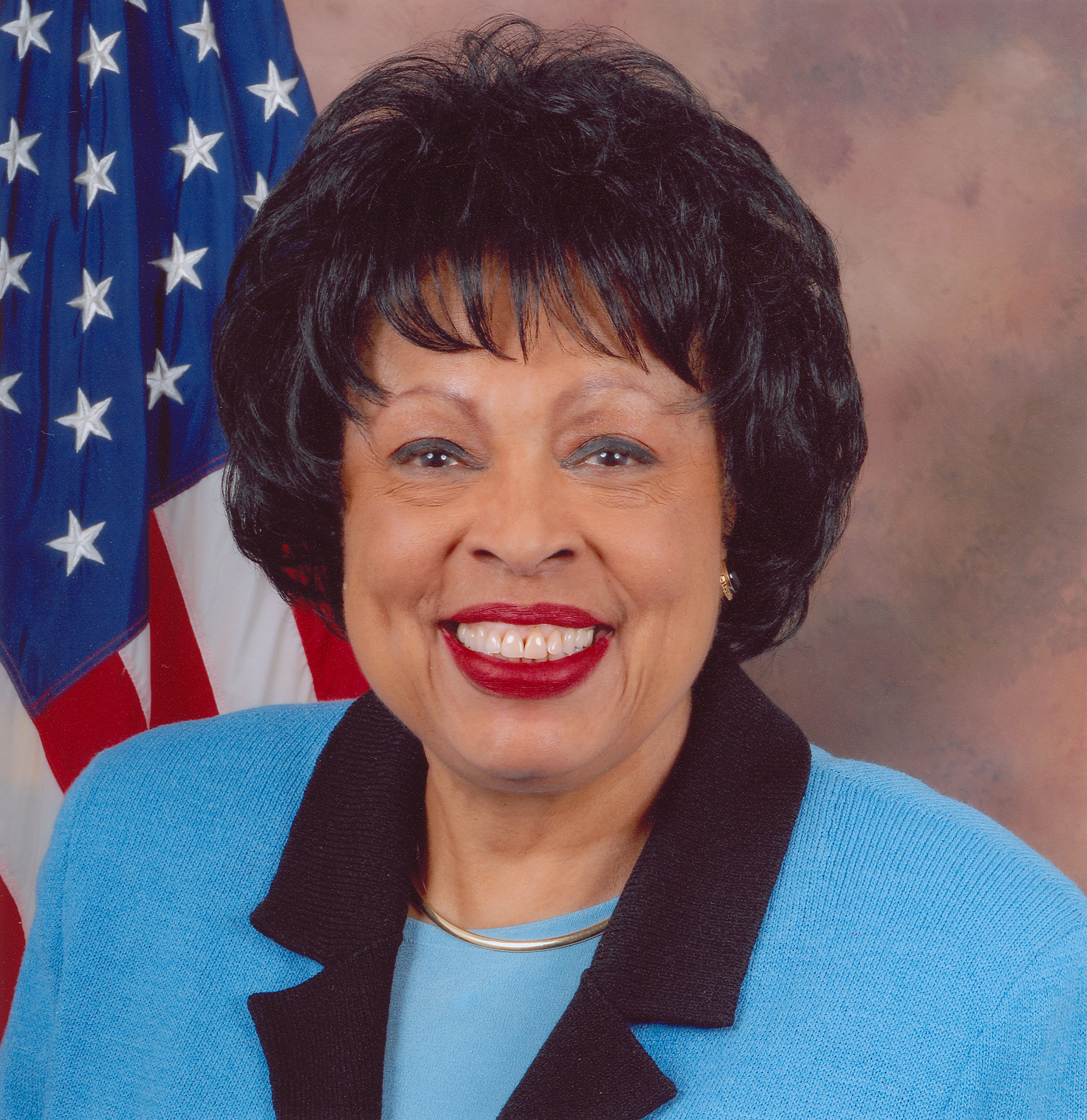
| Nominee | Diane Watson |
| Party | Democratic |
| Popular vote | 113,715 |
| Percentage | 100.0% |
U.S. Representative before election
Diane Watson
Democratic
Elected U.S. Representative
Diane Watson
Democratic

=== Predictions ===
| Source | Ranking | As of |
|---|---|---|
| The Cook Political Report | Safe D | November 6, 2006 |
| Rothenberg | Safe D | November 6, 2006 |
| Sabato's Crystal Ball | Safe D | November 6, 2006 |
| Real Clear Politics | Safe D | November 7, 2006 |
| CQ Politics | Safe D | November 7, 2006 |

=== Results ===
California's 33rd congressional district election, 2006
| Party | Candidate | Votes | % |
|---|---|---|---|
| Democratic | Diane Watson (incumbent) | 113,715 | 100.00 |
| Total votes | | 113,715 | 100.00 |
| Turnout | | | |
| Democratic hold | | | |

== District 34 ==
2006 California's 34th congressional district election
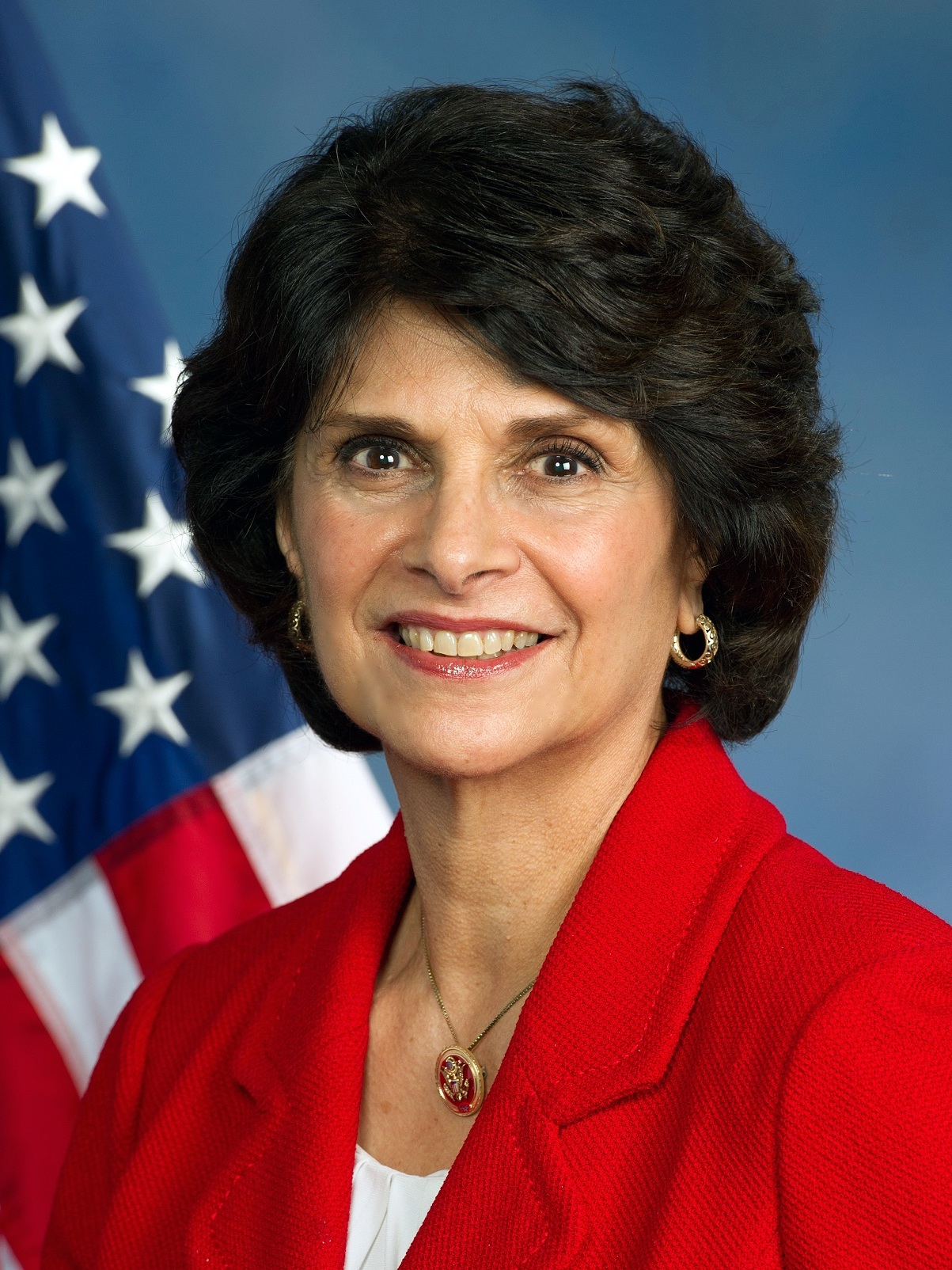

| Nominee | Lucille Roybal-Allard | Wayne Miller |
| Party | Democratic | Republican |
| Popular vote | 57,459 | 17,359 |
| Percentage | 76.9% | 23.2% |
- County results Roybal-Allard: 70–80%
U.S. Representative before election
Lucille Roybal-Allard
Democratic
Elected U.S. Representative
Lucille Roybal-Allard
Democratic

=== Predictions ===
| Source | Ranking | As of |
|---|---|---|
| The Cook Political Report | Safe D | November 6, 2006 |
| Rothenberg | Safe D | November 6, 2006 |
| Sabato's Crystal Ball | Safe D | November 6, 2006 |
| Real Clear Politics | Safe D | November 7, 2006 |
| CQ Politics | Safe D | November 7, 2006 |

=== Results ===
California's 34th congressional district election, 2006
| Party | Candidate | Votes | % |
|---|---|---|---|
| Democratic | Lucille Roybal-Allard (incumbent) | 57,459 | 76.92 |
| Republican | Wayne Miller | 17,359 | 23.20 |
| Independent | Naomi Crane (write-in) | 1 | 0.00 |
| Total votes | | 74,819 | 100.00 |
| Turnout | | | |
| Democratic hold | | | |

== District 35 ==
2006 California's 35th congressional district election
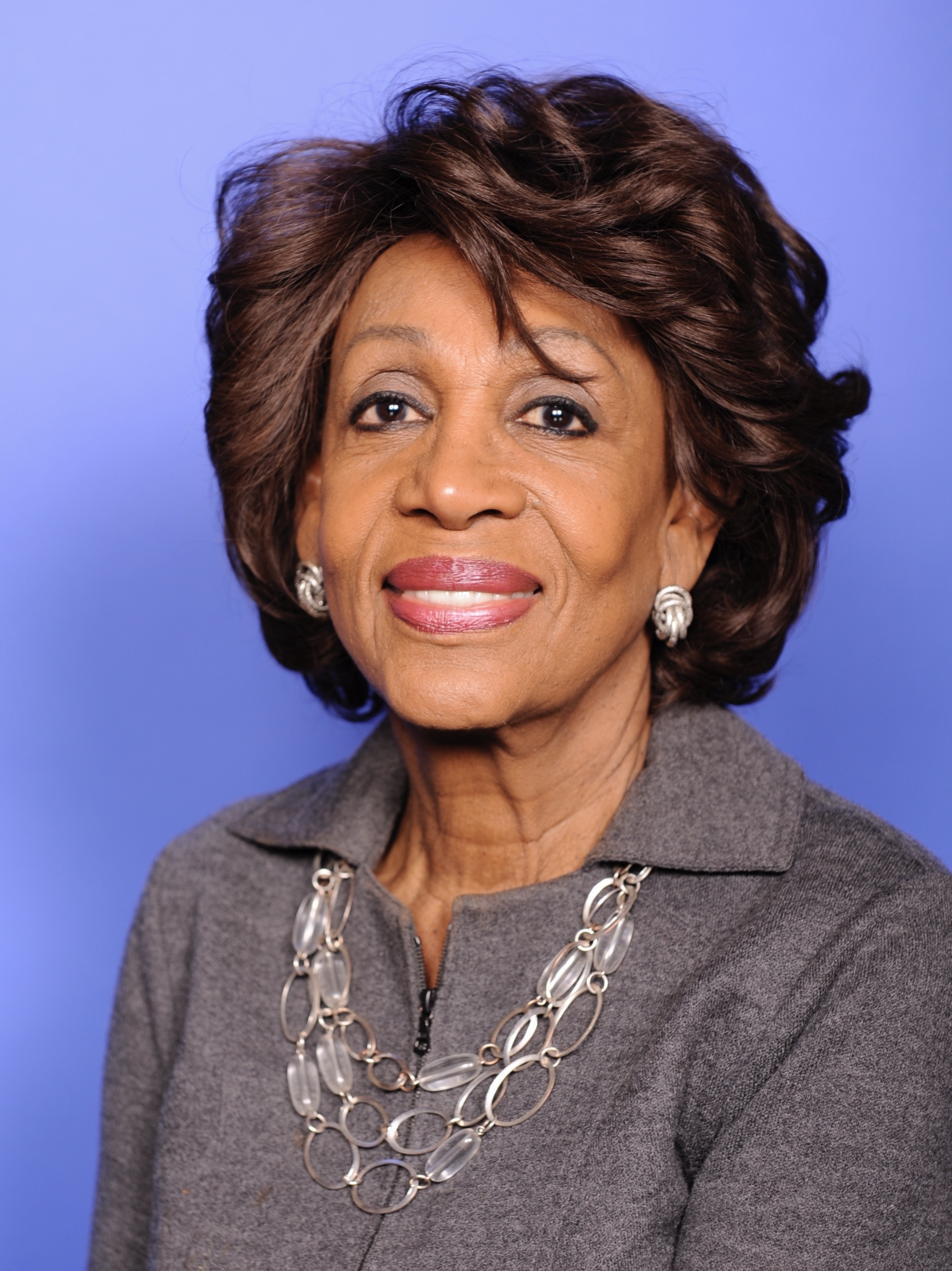

| Nominee | Maxine Waters | Gordon Mego | Paul Ireland |
| Party | Democratic | American Independent | Libertarian |
| Popular vote | 82,498 | 8,343 | 7,665 |
| Percentage | 83.8% | 8.5% | 7.8% |
- County results Waters: 80–90%
U.S. Representative before election
Maxine Waters
Democratic
Elected U.S. Representative
Maxine Waters
Democratic

=== Predictions ===
| Source | Ranking | As of |
|---|---|---|
| The Cook Political Report | Safe D | November 6, 2006 |
| Rothenberg | Safe D | November 6, 2006 |
| Sabato's Crystal Ball | Safe D | November 6, 2006 |
| Real Clear Politics | Safe D | November 7, 2006 |
| CQ Politics | Safe D | November 7, 2006 |

=== Results ===
California's 35th congressional district election, 2006
| Party | Candidate | Votes | % |
|---|---|---|---|
| Democratic | Maxine Waters (incumbent) | 82,498 | 83.75 |
| American Independent | Gordon Mego | 8,343 | 8.47 |
| Libertarian | Paul Ireland | 7,665 | 7.78 |
| Total votes | | 98,506 | 100.00 |
| Turnout | | | |
| Democratic hold | | | |

== District 36 ==
2006 California's 36th congressional district election
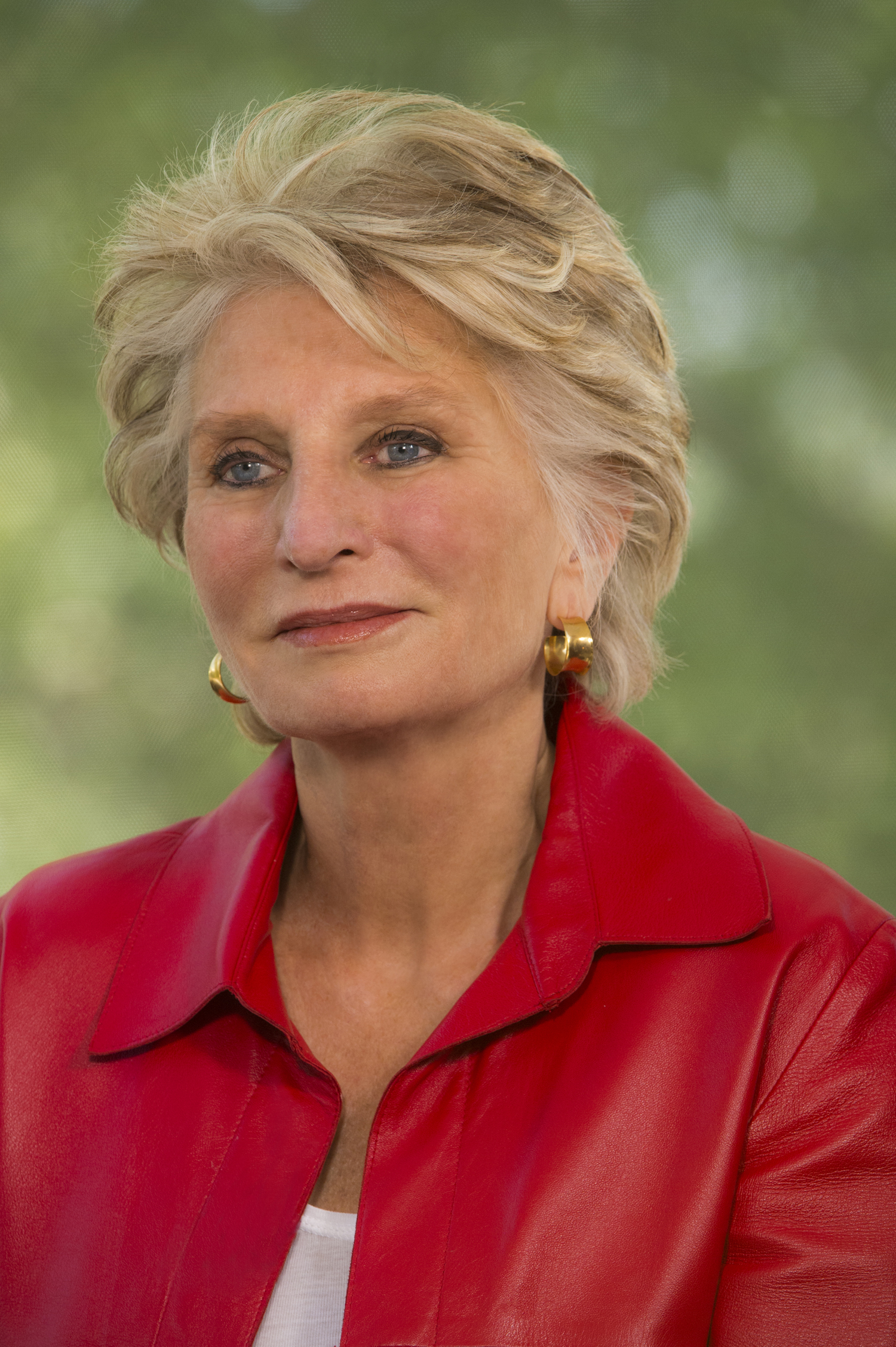

| Nominee | Jane Harman | Brian Gibson |
| Party | Democratic | Republican |
| Popular vote | 105,323 | 53,068 |
| Percentage | 63.4% | 31.9% |
- County results Harman: 60–70%
U.S. Representative before election
Jane Harman
Democratic
Elected U.S. Representative
Jane Harman
Democratic

=== Predictions ===
| Source | Ranking | As of |
|---|---|---|
| The Cook Political Report | Safe D | November 6, 2006 |
| Rothenberg | Safe D | November 6, 2006 |
| Sabato's Crystal Ball | Safe D | November 6, 2006 |
| Real Clear Politics | Safe D | November 7, 2006 |
| CQ Politics | Safe D | November 7, 2006 |

=== Results ===
California's 36th congressional district election, 2006
| Party | Candidate | Votes | % |
|---|---|---|---|
| Democratic | Jane Harman (incumbent) | 105,323 | 63.39 |
| Republican | Brian Gibson | 53,068 | 31.94 |
| Peace and Freedom | James Smith | 4,592 | 2.76 |
| Libertarian | Mike Binkley | 3,170 | 1.91 |
| Total votes | | 166,153 | 100.00 |
| Turnout | | | |
| Democratic hold | | | |

== District 37 ==
2006 California's 37th congressional district election
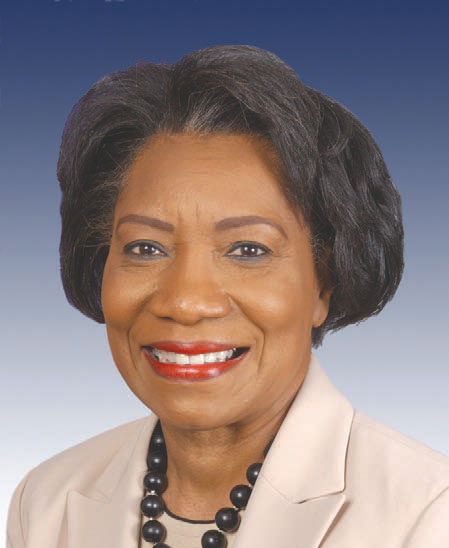

| Nominee | Juanita Millender-McDonald | Herb Peters |
| Party | Democratic | Libertarian |
| Popular vote | 80,716 | 17,246 |
| Percentage | 82.4% | 17.6% |
- County results Millender-Mcdonald: 80–90%
U.S. Representative before election
Juanita Millender-McDonald
Democratic
Elected U.S. Representative
Juanita Millender-McDonald
Democratic

=== Predictions ===
| Source | Ranking | As of |
|---|---|---|
| The Cook Political Report | Safe D | November 6, 2006 |
| Rothenberg | Safe D | November 6, 2006 |
| Sabato's Crystal Ball | Safe D | November 6, 2006 |
| Real Clear Politics | Safe D | November 7, 2006 |
| CQ Politics | Safe D | November 7, 2006 |

=== Results ===
California's 37th congressional district election, 2006
| Party | Candidate | Votes | % |
|---|---|---|---|
| Democratic | Juanita Millender-McDonald (incumbent) | 80,716 | 82.40 |
| Libertarian | Herb Peters | 17,246 | 17.60 |
| Total votes | | 97,962 | 100.00 |
| Turnout | | | |
| Democratic hold | | | |

== District 38 ==
2006 California's 38th congressional district election
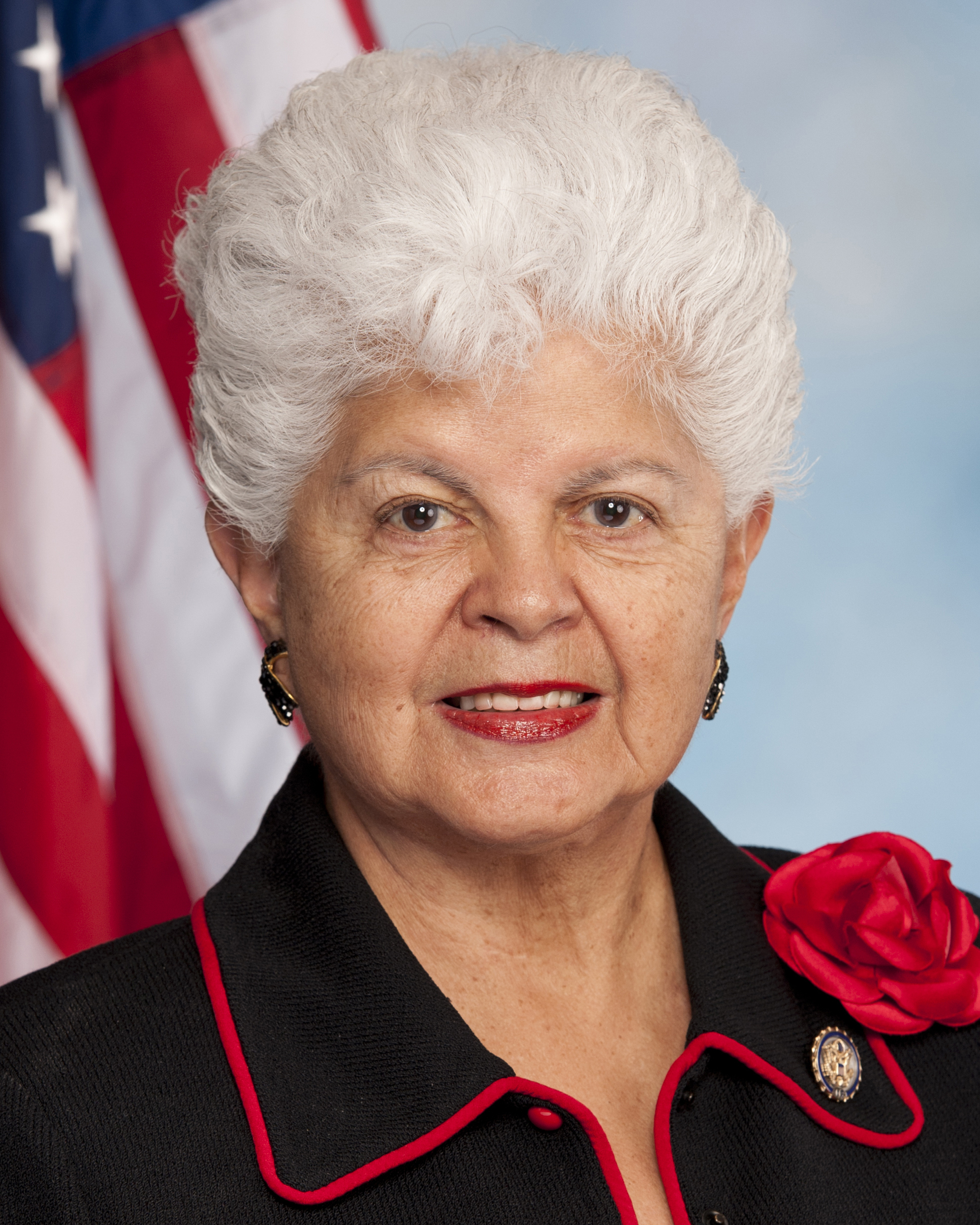

| Nominee | Grace Napolitano | Sidney Street |
| Party | Democratic | Republican |
| Popular vote | 75,181 | 24,620 |
| Percentage | 75.3% | 24.7% |
- County results Napolitano: 70–80%
U.S. Representative before election
Grace Napolitano
Democratic
Elected U.S. Representative
Grace Napolitano
Democratic

=== Predictions ===
| Source | Ranking | As of |
|---|---|---|
| The Cook Political Report | Safe D | November 6, 2006 |
| Rothenberg | Safe D | November 6, 2006 |
| Sabato's Crystal Ball | Safe D | November 6, 2006 |
| Real Clear Politics | Safe D | November 7, 2006 |
| CQ Politics | Safe D | November 7, 2006 |

=== Results ===
California's 38th congressional district election, 2006
| Party | Candidate | Votes | % |
|---|---|---|---|
| Democratic | Grace Napolitano (incumbent) | 75,181 | 75.33 |
| Republican | Sidney Street | 24,620 | 24.67 |
| Total votes | | 99,801 | 100.00 |
| Turnout | | | |
| Democratic hold | | | |

== District 39 ==
2006 California's 39th congressional district election
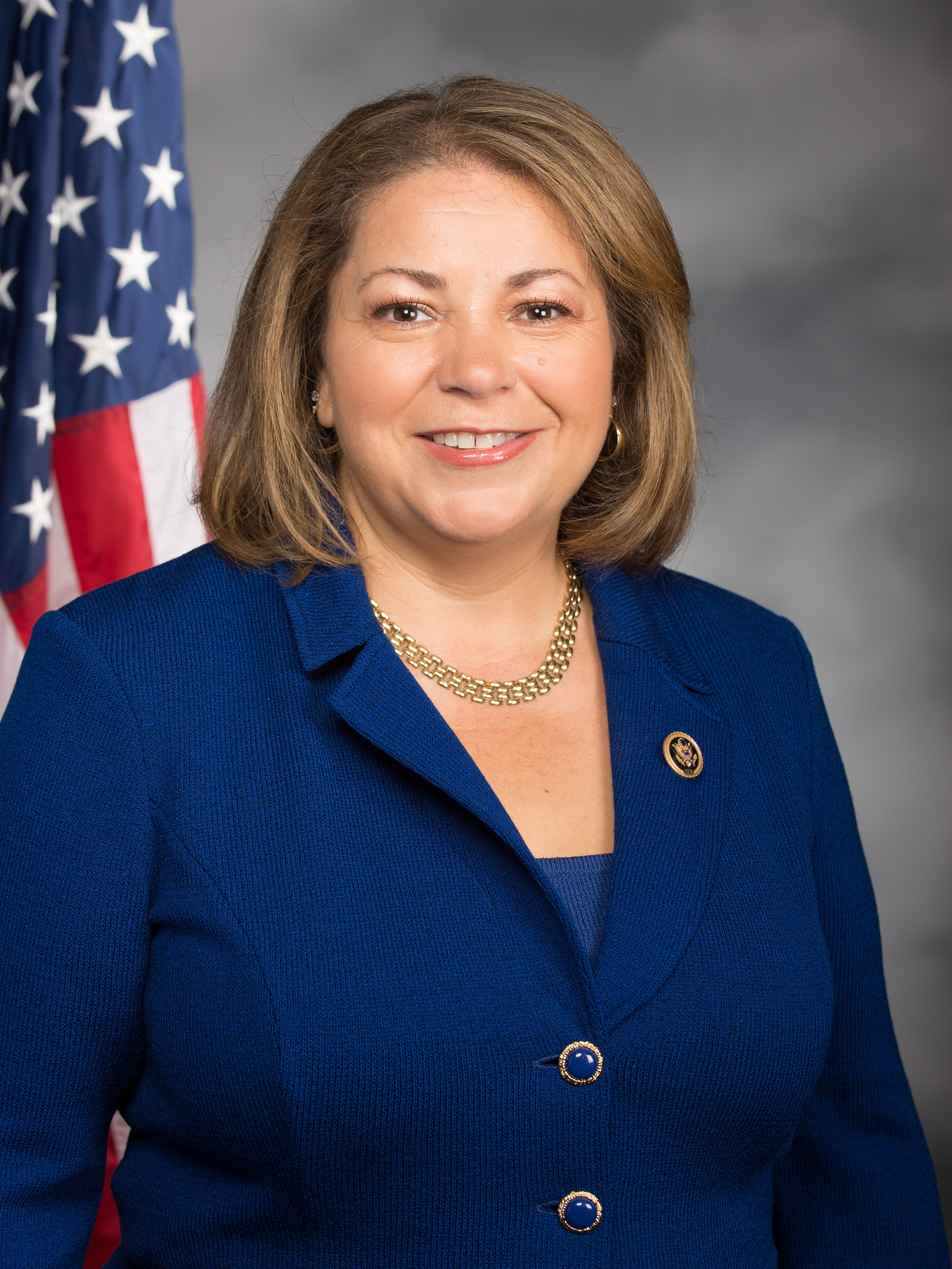

| Nominee | Linda Sánchez | James Andion |
| Party | Democratic | Republican |
| Popular vote | 72,149 | 37,384 |
| Percentage | 65.9% | 34.1% |
- County results Sanchez: 60–70%
U.S. Representative before election
Linda Sánchez
Democratic
Elected U.S. Representative
Linda Sánchez
Democratic

=== Predictions ===
| Source | Ranking | As of |
|---|---|---|
| The Cook Political Report | Safe D | November 6, 2006 |
| Rothenberg | Safe D | November 6, 2006 |
| Sabato's Crystal Ball | Safe D | November 6, 2006 |
| Real Clear Politics | Safe D | November 7, 2006 |
| CQ Politics | Safe D | November 7, 2006 |

=== Results ===
California's 39th congressional district election, 2006
| Party | Candidate | Votes | % |
|---|---|---|---|
| Democratic | Linda Sánchez (incumbent) | 72,149 | 65.87 |
| Republican | James Andion | 37,384 | 34.13 |
| Total votes | | 109,533 | 100.00 |
| Turnout | | | |
| Democratic hold | | | |

== District 40 ==
2006 California's 40th congressional district election
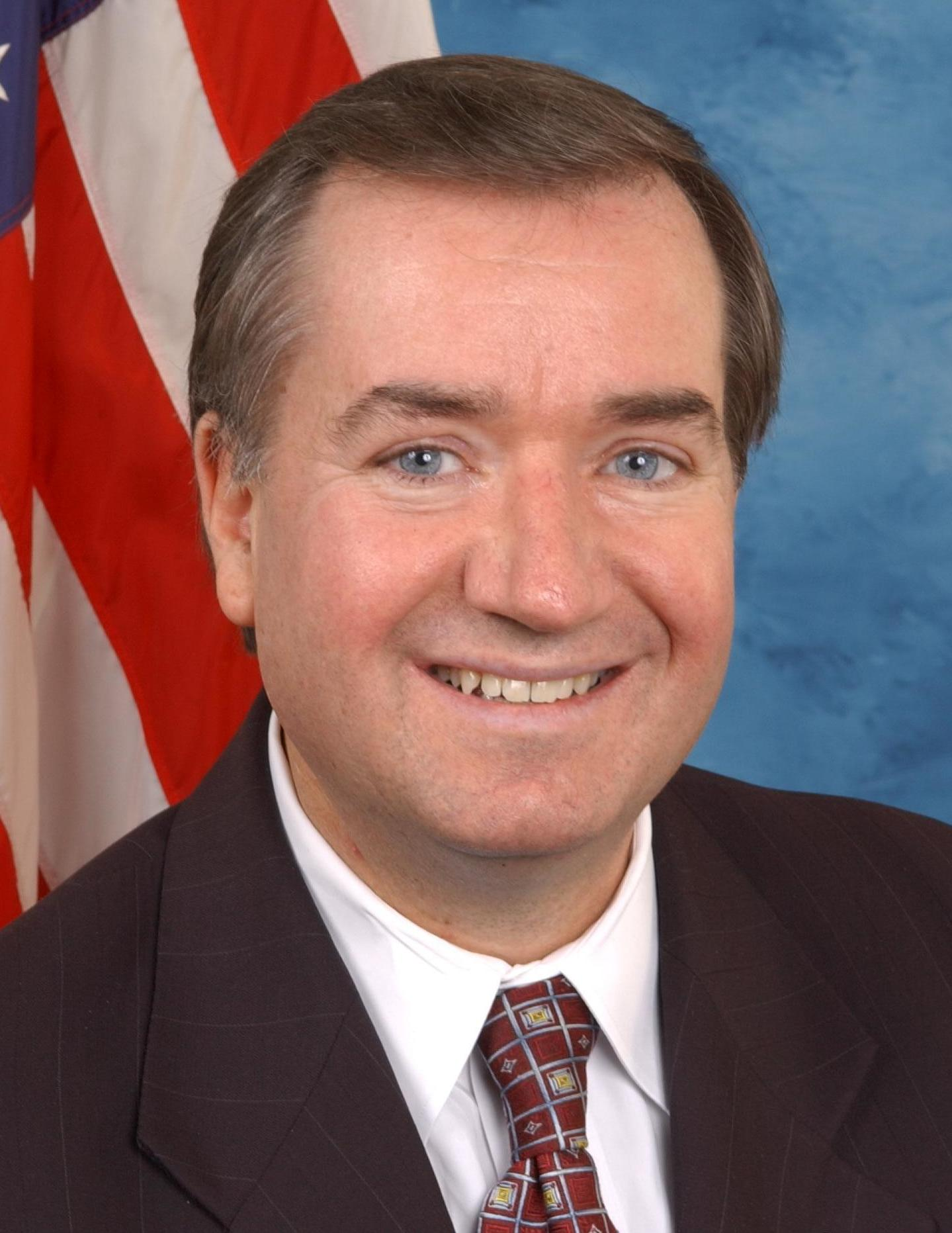

| Nominee | Ed Royce | Florice Hoffman |
| Party | Republican | Democratic |
| Popular vote | 100,995 | 46,418 |
| Percentage | 66.8% | 30.7% |
- County results Royce: 60–70%
U.S. Representative before election
Ed Royce
Republican
Elected U.S. Representative
Ed Royce
Republican

=== Predictions ===
| Source | Ranking | As of |
|---|---|---|
| The Cook Political Report | Safe R | November 6, 2006 |
| Rothenberg | Safe R | November 6, 2006 |
| Sabato's Crystal Ball | Safe R | November 6, 2006 |
| Real Clear Politics | Safe R | November 7, 2006 |
| CQ Politics | Safe R | November 7, 2006 |

=== Results ===
California's 40th congressional district election, 2006
| Party | Candidate | Votes | % |
|---|---|---|---|
| Republican | Ed Royce (incumbent) | 100,995 | 66.76 |
| Democratic | Florice Hoffman | 46,418 | 30.68 |
| Libertarian | Philip Inman | 3,876 | 2.56 |
| Total votes | | 151,289 | 100.00 |
| Turnout | | | |
| Republican hold | | | |

== District 41 ==
2006 California's 41st congressional district election
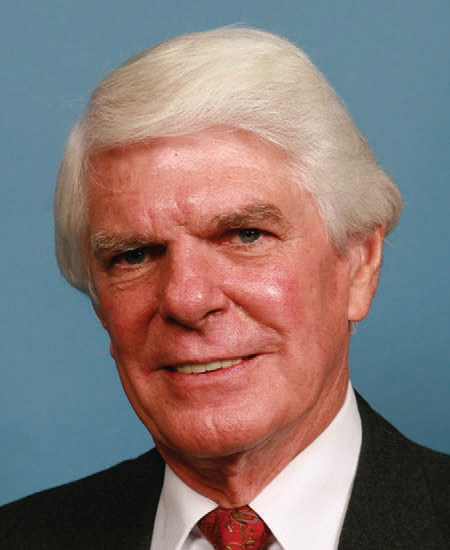

| Nominee | Jerry Lewis | Louie Contreras |
| Party | Republican | Democratic |
| Popular vote | 109,761 | 54,235 |
| Percentage | 66.9% | 33.1% |
- County results Lewis: 60–70%
U.S. Representative before election
Jerry Lewis
Republican
Elected U.S. Representative
Jerry Lewis
Republican

=== Predictions ===
| Source | Ranking | As of |
|---|---|---|
| The Cook Political Report | Safe R | November 6, 2006 |
| Rothenberg | Safe R | November 6, 2006 |
| Sabato's Crystal Ball | Safe R | November 6, 2006 |
| Real Clear Politics | Safe R | November 7, 2006 |
| CQ Politics | Safe R | November 7, 2006 |

=== Results ===
California's 41st congressional district election, 2006
| Party | Candidate | Votes | % |
|---|---|---|---|
| Republican | Jerry Lewis (incumbent) | 109,761 | 66.91 |
| Democratic | Louie Contreras | 54,235 | 33.06 |
| Independent | Carol Petersen (write-in) | 48 | 0.03 |
| Total votes | | 164,044 | 100.00 |
| Turnout | | | |
| Republican hold | | | |

== District 42 ==
2006 California's 42nd congressional district election
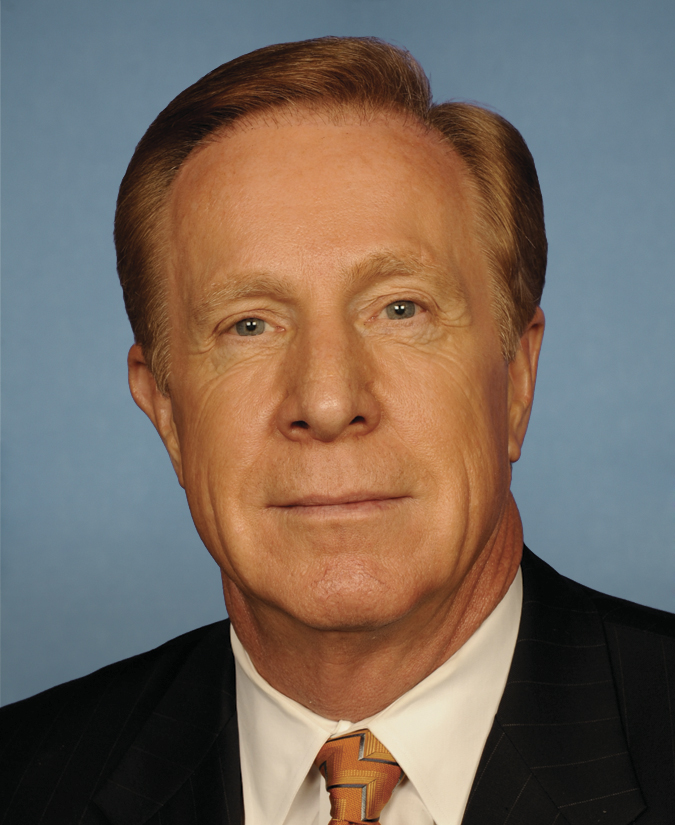
| Nominee | Gary Miller |
| Party | Republican |
| Popular vote | 129,720 |
| Percentage | 100.0% |
U.S. Representative before election
Gary Miller
Republican
Elected U.S. Representative
Gary Miller
Republican

=== Predictions ===
| Source | Ranking | As of |
|---|---|---|
| The Cook Political Report | Safe R | November 6, 2006 |
| Rothenberg | Safe R | November 6, 2006 |
| Sabato's Crystal Ball | Safe R | November 6, 2006 |
| Real Clear Politics | Safe R | November 7, 2006 |
| CQ Politics | Safe R | November 7, 2006 |

=== Results ===
California's 42nd congressional district election, 2006
| Party | Candidate | Votes | % |
|---|---|---|---|
| Republican | Gary Miller (incumbent) | 129,720 | 100.00 |
| Total votes | | 129,720 | 100.00 |
| Turnout | | | |
| Republican hold | | | |

== District 43 ==
2006 California's 43rd congressional district election
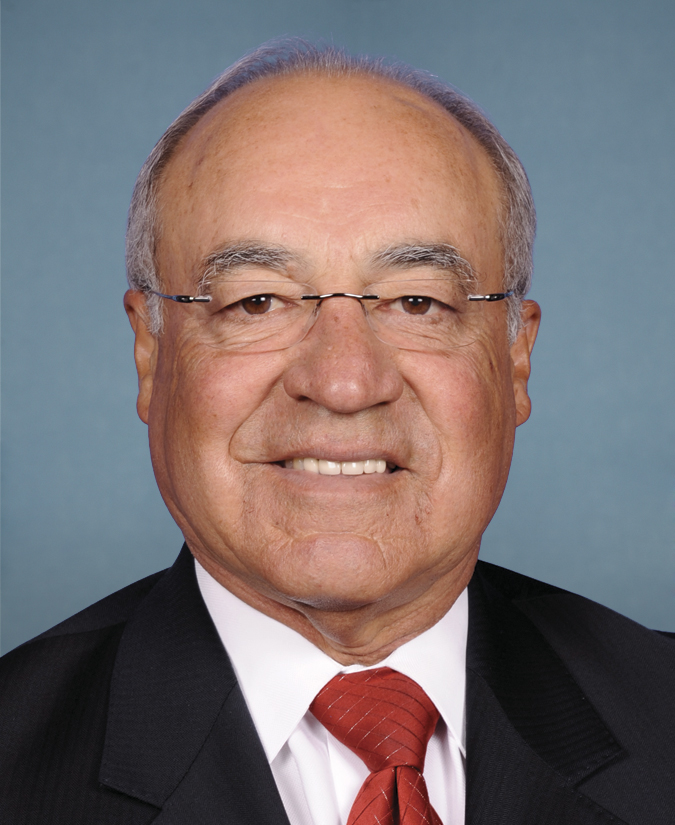

| Nominee | Joe Baca | Scott Folkens |
| Party | Democratic | Republican |
| Popular vote | 52,791 | 29,069 |
| Percentage | 64.5% | 35.5% |
- County results Baca: 60–70%
U.S. Representative before election
Joe Baca
Democratic
Elected U.S. Representative
Joe Baca
Democratic

=== Predictions ===
| Source | Ranking | As of |
|---|---|---|
| The Cook Political Report | Safe D | November 6, 2006 |
| Rothenberg | Safe D | November 6, 2006 |
| Sabato's Crystal Ball | Safe D | November 6, 2006 |
| Real Clear Politics | Safe D | November 7, 2006 |
| CQ Politics | Safe D | November 7, 2006 |

=== Results ===
California's 43rd congressional district election, 2006
| Party | Candidate | Votes | % |
|---|---|---|---|
| Democratic | Joe Baca (incumbent) | 52,791 | 64.49 |
| Republican | Scott Folkens | 29,069 | 35.51 |
| Total votes | | 81,860 | 100.00 |
| Turnout | | | |
| Democratic hold | | | |

== District 44 ==
2006 California's 44th congressional district election
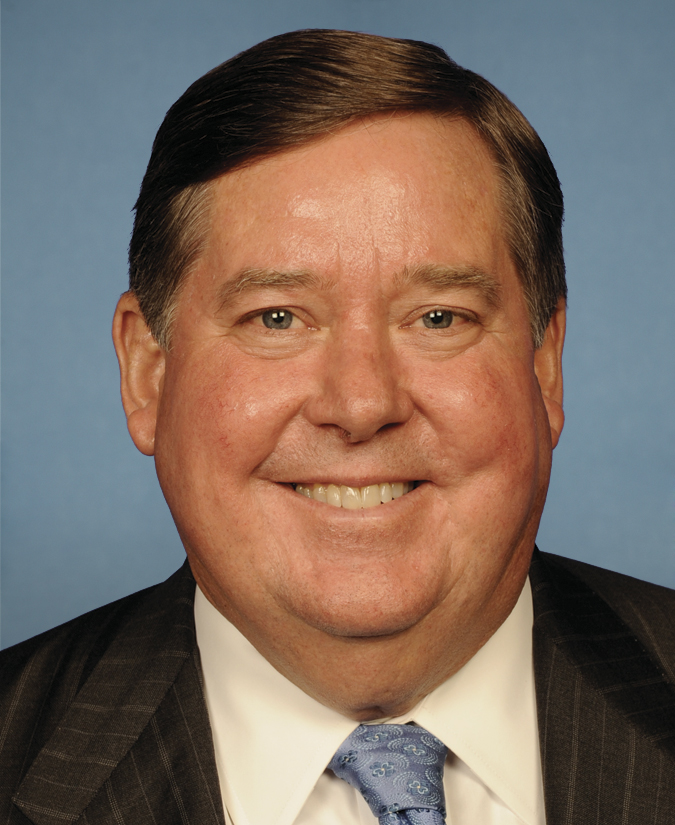

| Nominee | Ken Calvert | Louis Vandenburg |
| Party | Republican | Democratic |
| Popular vote | 89,555 | 55,275 |
| Percentage | 60.0% | 37.0% |
- County results Calvert: 50–60% 60–70%
U.S. Representative before election
Ken Calvert
Republican
Elected U.S. Representative
Ken Calvert
Republican

=== Predictions ===
| Source | Ranking | As of |
|---|---|---|
| The Cook Political Report | Safe R | November 6, 2006 |
| Rothenberg | Safe R | November 6, 2006 |
| Sabato's Crystal Ball | Safe R | November 6, 2006 |
| Real Clear Politics | Safe R | November 7, 2006 |
| CQ Politics | Safe R | November 7, 2006 |

=== Results ===
California's 44th congressional district election, 2006
| Party | Candidate | Votes | % |
|---|---|---|---|
| Republican | Ken Calvert (incumbent) | 89,555 | 59.98 |
| Democratic | Louis Vandenburg | 55,275 | 37.02 |
| Peace and Freedom | Kevin Akin | 4,486 | 3.00 |
| Total votes | | 149,316 | 100.00 |
| Turnout | | | |
| Republican hold | | | |

== District 45 ==
2006 California's 45th congressional district election
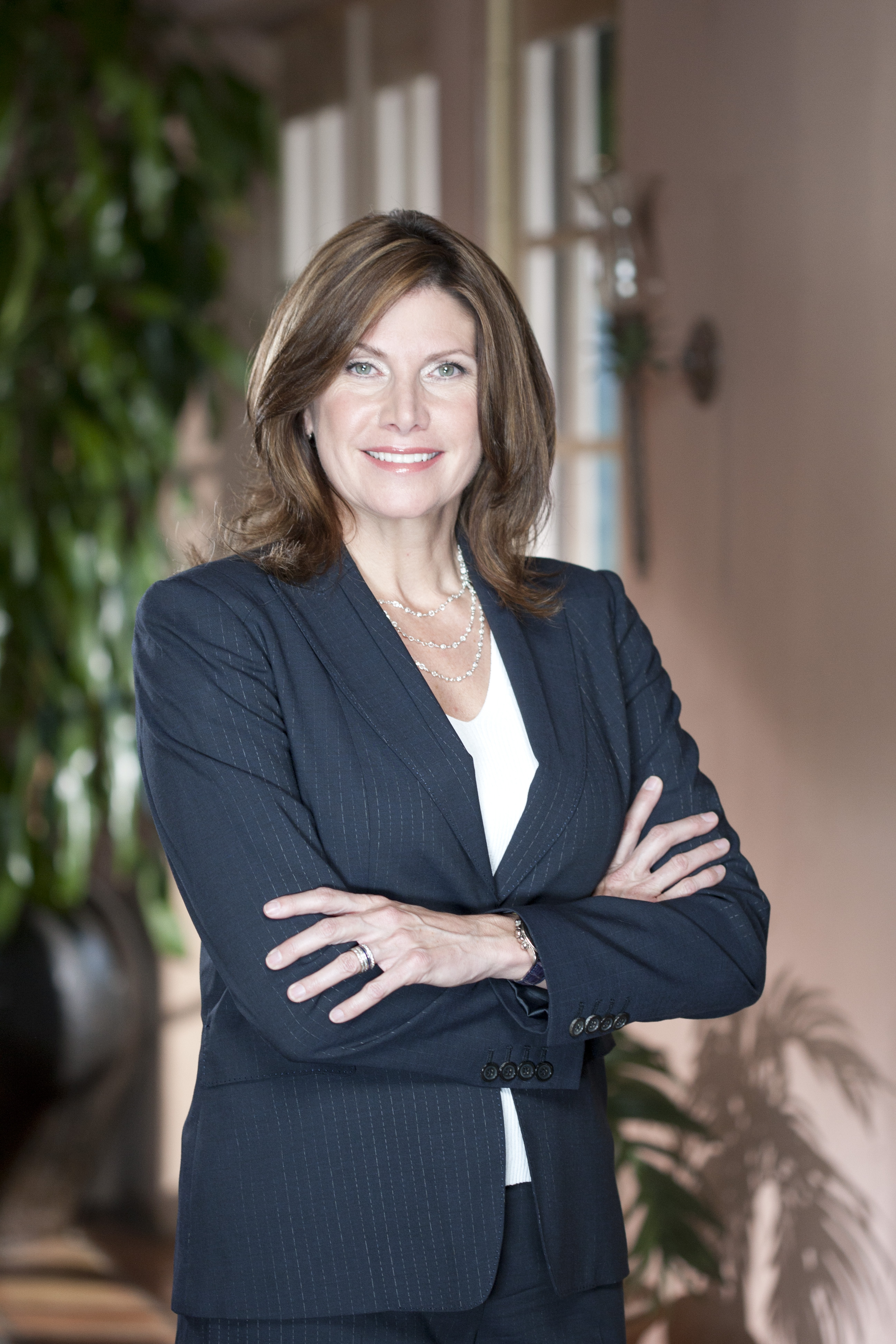

| Nominee | Mary Bono | David Roth |
| Party | Republican | Democratic |
| Popular vote | 99,638 | 64,613 |
| Percentage | 60.7% | 39.3% |
- County results Bono: 60–70%
U.S. Representative before election
Mary Bono
Republican
Elected U.S. Representative
Mary Bono
Republican

=== Predictions ===
| Source | Ranking | As of |
|---|---|---|
| The Cook Political Report | Safe R | November 6, 2006 |
| Rothenberg | Safe R | November 6, 2006 |
| Sabato's Crystal Ball | Safe R | November 6, 2006 |
| Real Clear Politics | Safe R | November 7, 2006 |
| CQ Politics | Safe R | November 7, 2006 |

=== Results ===
California's 45th congressional district election, 2006
| Party | Candidate | Votes | % |
|---|---|---|---|
| Republican | Mary Bono (incumbent) | 99,638 | 60.66 |
| Democratic | David Roth | 64,613 | 39.34 |
| Total votes | | 164,251 | 100.00 |
| Turnout | | | |
| Republican hold | | | |

== District 46 ==
2006 California's 46th congressional district election
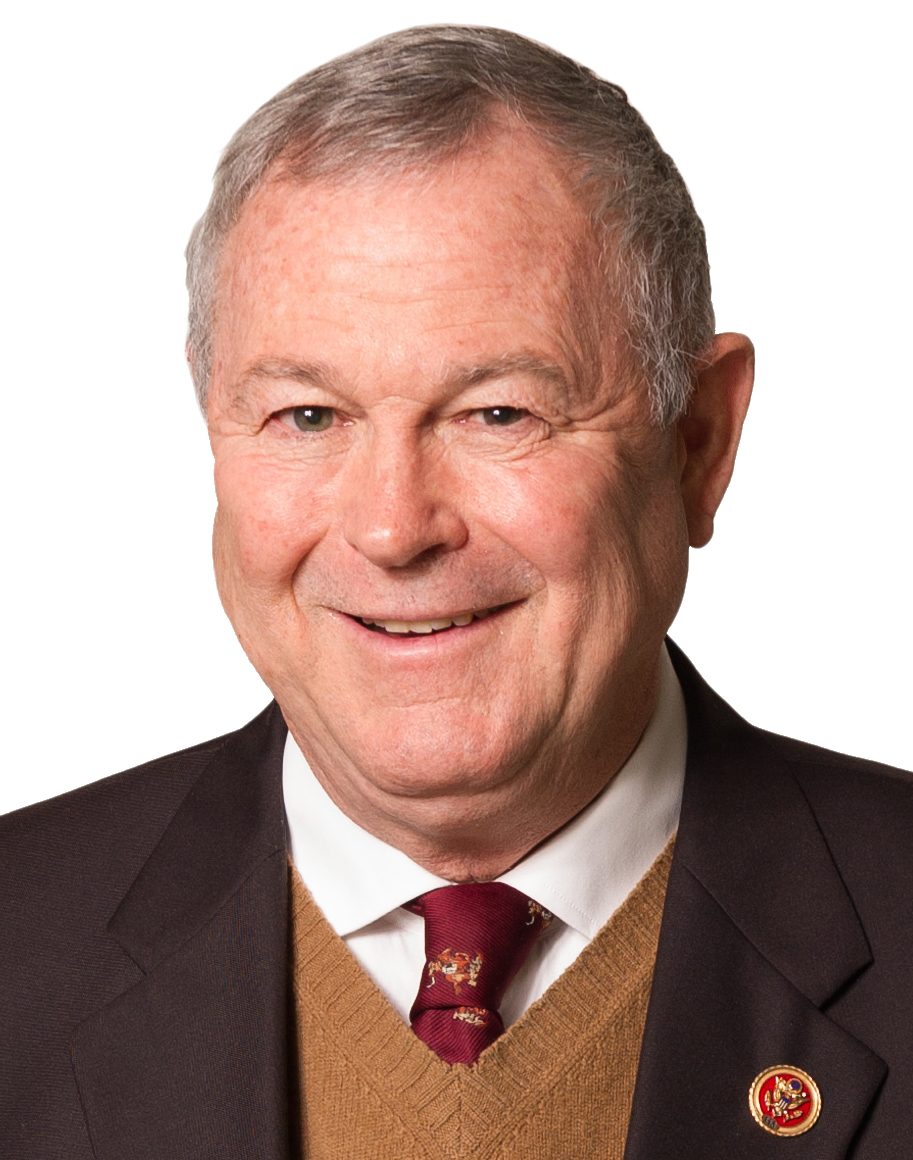

| Nominee | Dana Rohrabacher | Jim Brandt |
| Party | Republican | Democratic |
| Popular vote | 116,176 | 71,573 |
| Percentage | 59.6% | 36.7% |
- County results Rohrabacher: 50–60% 60–70%
U.S. Representative before election
Dana Rohrabacher
Republican
Elected U.S. Representative
Dana Rohrabacher
Republican

=== Endorsements ===
Jim Brandt (D)

Individuals

- Wesley Clark, General, 2004 democratic presidential candidate

==== Predictions ====
| Source | Ranking | As of |
|---|---|---|
| The Cook Political Report | Safe R | November 6, 2006 |
| Rothenberg | Safe R | November 6, 2006 |
| Sabato's Crystal Ball | Safe R | November 6, 2006 |
| Real Clear Politics | Safe R | November 7, 2006 |
| CQ Politics | Safe R | November 7, 2006 |

=== Results ===
California's 46th congressional district election, 2006
| Party | Candidate | Votes | % |
|---|---|---|---|
| Republican | Dana Rohrabacher (incumbent) | 116,176 | 59.56 |
| Democratic | Jim Brandt | 71,573 | 36.69 |
| Libertarian | Dennis Chang | 7,303 | 3.74 |
| Total votes | | 195,052 | 100.00 |
| Turnout | | | |
| Republican hold | | | |

== District 47 ==
2006 California's 47th congressional district election
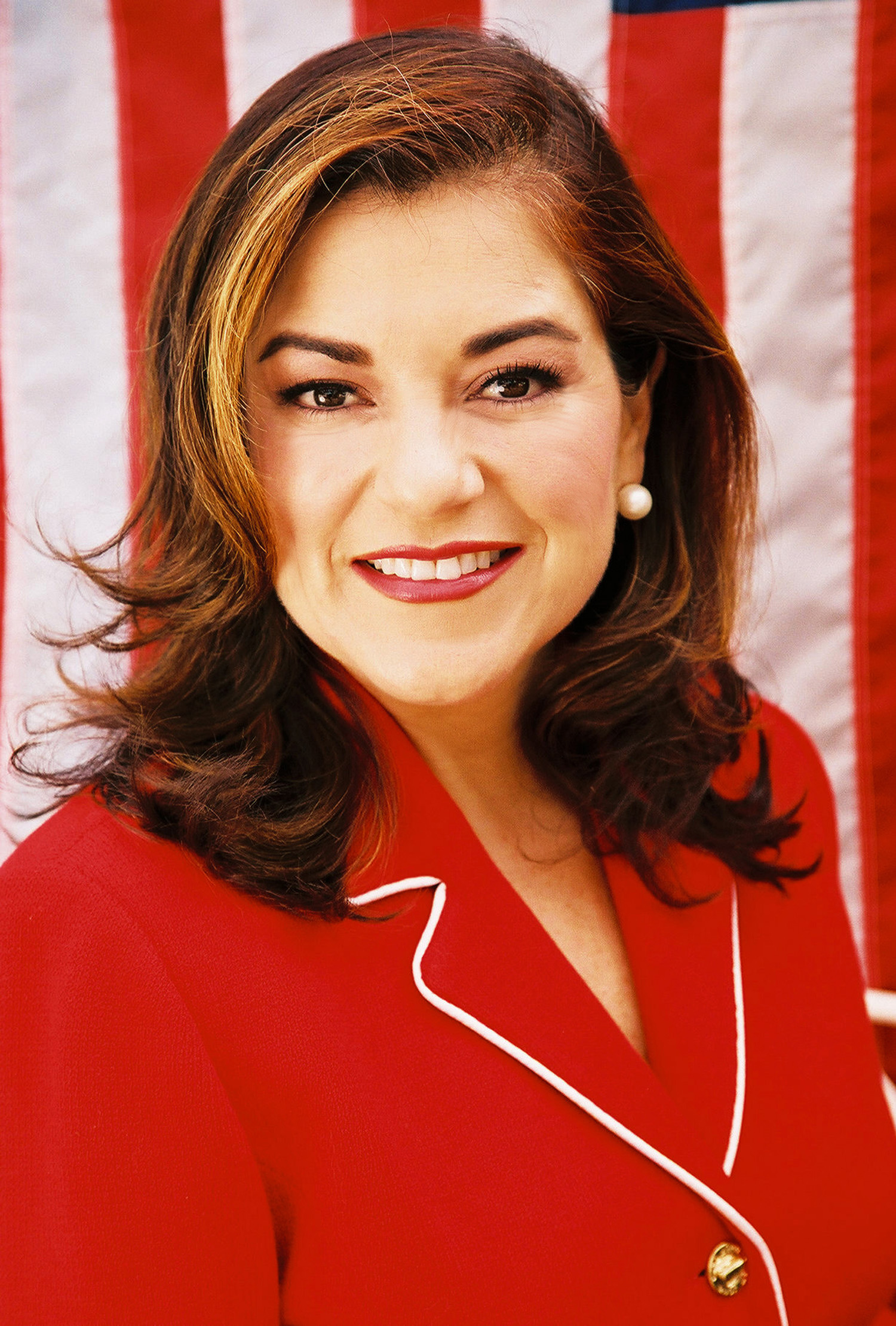

| Nominee | Loretta Sanchez | Tan Nguyen |
| Party | Democratic | Republican |
| Popular vote | 47,134 | 28,485 |
| Percentage | 62.3% | 37.7% |
- County results Sanchez: 60–70%
U.S. Representative before election
Loretta Sanchez
Democratic
Elected U.S. Representative
Loretta Sanchez
Democratic

=== Predictions ===
| Source | Ranking | As of |
|---|---|---|
| The Cook Political Report | Safe D | November 6, 2006 |
| Rothenberg | Safe D | November 6, 2006 |
| Sabato's Crystal Ball | Safe D | November 6, 2006 |
| Real Clear Politics | Safe D | November 7, 2006 |
| CQ Politics | Safe D | November 7, 2006 |

=== Results ===
California's 47th congressional district election, 2006
| Party | Candidate | Votes | % |
|---|---|---|---|
| Democratic | Loretta Sanchez (incumbent) | 47,134 | 62.33 |
| Republican | Tan Nguyen | 28,485 | 37.67 |
| Total votes | | 75,619 | 100.00 |
| Turnout | | | |
| Democratic hold | | | |

== District 48 ==
2006 California's 48th congressional district election
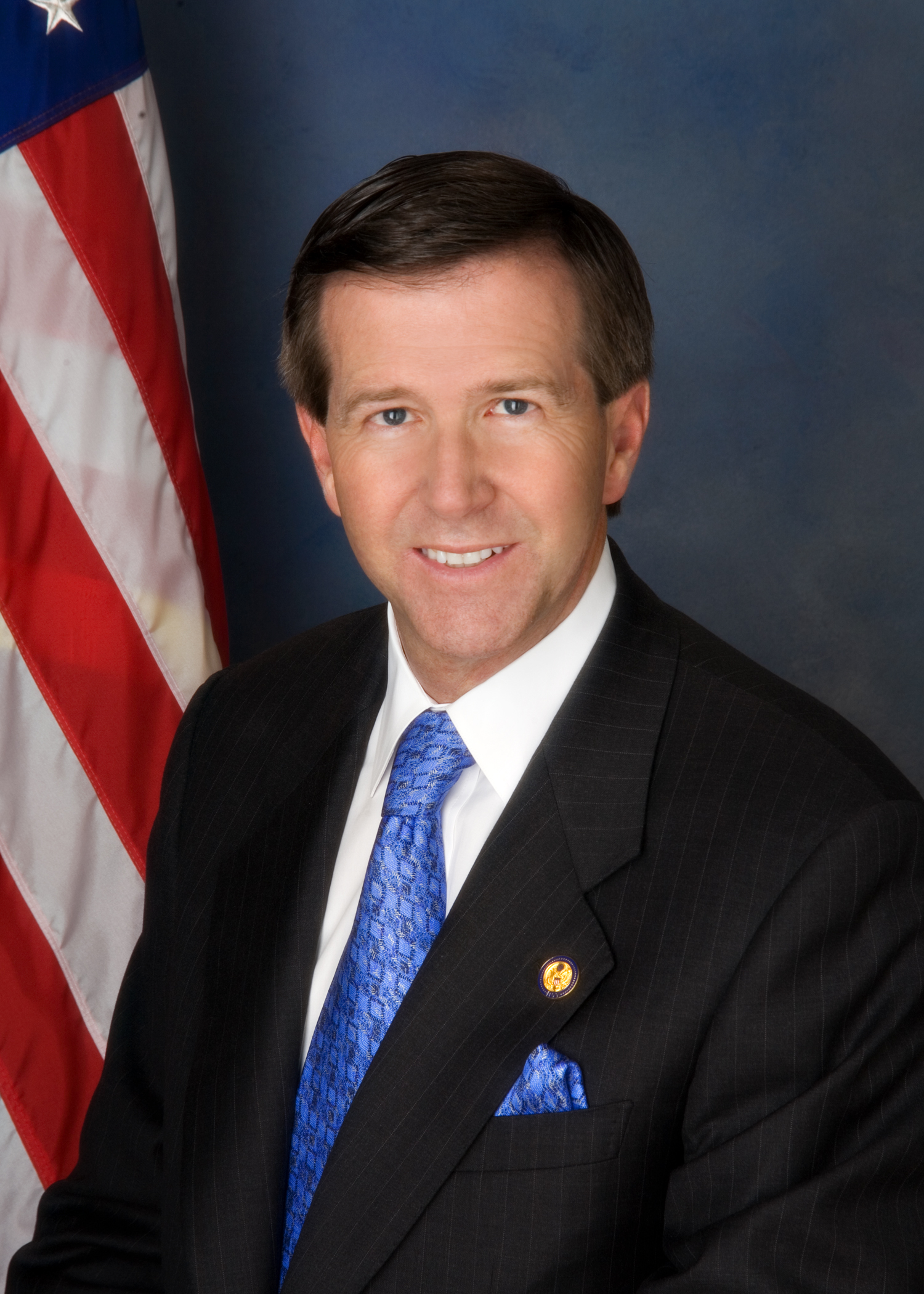

| Nominee | John Campbell | Steve Young |
| Party | Republican | Democratic |
| Popular vote | 120,130 | 74,647 |
| Percentage | 59.9% | 37.2% |
- County results Campbell: 50–60%
U.S. Representative before election
John Campbell
Republican
Elected U.S. Representative
John Campbell
Republican

=== Predictions ===
| Source | Ranking | As of |
|---|---|---|
| The Cook Political Report | Safe R | November 6, 2006 |
| Rothenberg | Safe R | November 6, 2006 |
| Sabato's Crystal Ball | Safe R | November 6, 2006 |
| Real Clear Politics | Safe R | November 7, 2006 |
| CQ Politics | Safe R | November 7, 2006 |

=== Results ===
California's 48th congressional district election, 2006
| Party | Candidate | Votes | % |
|---|---|---|---|
| Republican | John Campbell (incumbent) | 120,130 | 59.91 |
| Democratic | Steve Young | 74,647 | 37.23 |
| Libertarian | Bruce Cohen | 5,750 | 2.87 |
| Total votes | | 200,527 | 100.00 |
| Turnout | | | |
| Republican hold | | | |

== District 49 ==
2006 California's 49th congressional district election
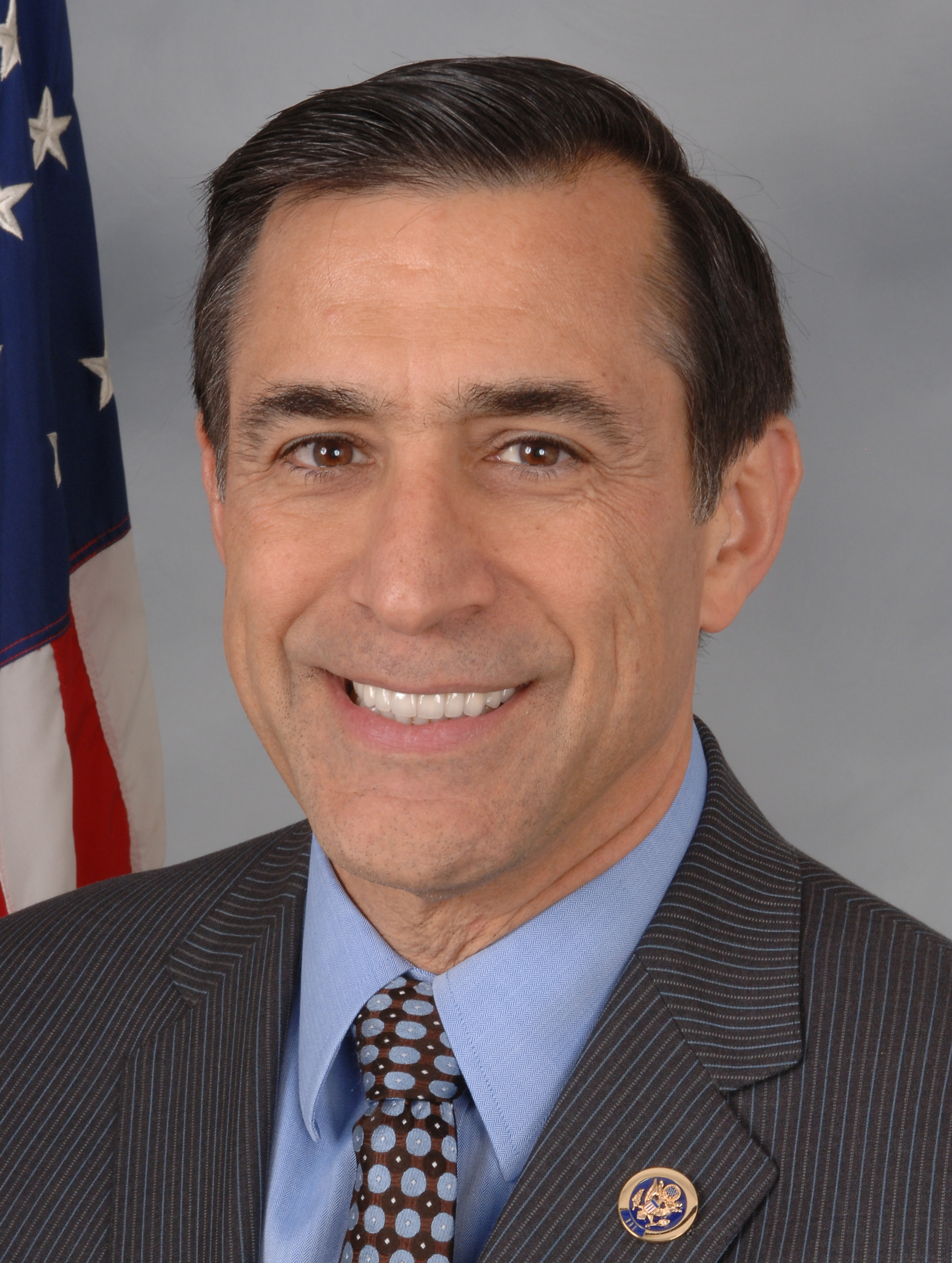

| Nominee | Darrell Issa | Jeeni Criscenzo |
| Party | Republican | Democratic |
| Popular vote | 98,831 | 52,227 |
| Percentage | 63.3% | 33.5% |
- County results Issa: 60–70%
U.S. Representative before election
Darrell Issa
Republican
Elected U.S. Representative
Darrell Issa
Republican

=== Predictions ===
| Source | Ranking | As of |
|---|---|---|
| The Cook Political Report | Safe R | November 6, 2006 |
| Rothenberg | Safe R | November 6, 2006 |
| Sabato's Crystal Ball | Safe R | November 6, 2006 |
| Real Clear Politics | Safe R | November 7, 2006 |
| CQ Politics | Safe R | November 7, 2006 |

=== Results ===
California's 49th congressional district election, 2006
| Party | Candidate | Votes | % |
|---|---|---|---|
| Republican | Darrell Issa (incumbent) | 98,831 | 63.30 |
| Democratic | Jeeni Criscenzo | 52,227 | 33.45 |
| Libertarian | Lars Grossmith | 4,952 | 3.17 |
| Democratic | Frank Ford (write-in) | 127 | 0.08 |
| Total votes | | 156,137 | 100.00 |
| Turnout | | | |
| Republican hold | | | |

== District 50 ==
2006 California's 50th congressional district election
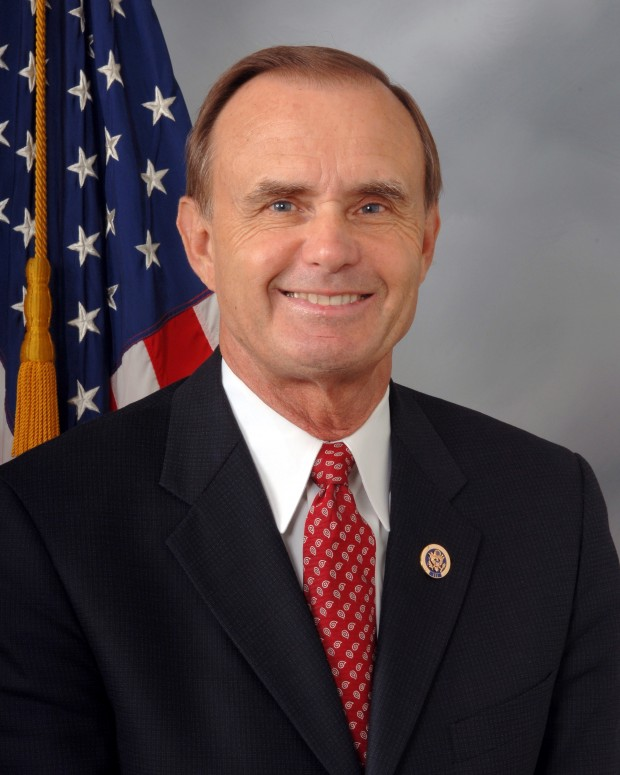

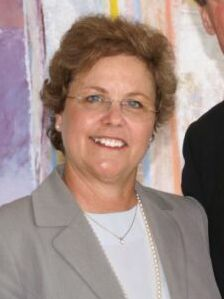
| Nominee | Brian Bilbray | Francine Busby |
| Party | Republican | Democratic |
| Popular vote | 118,018 | 96,612 |
| Percentage | 53.1% | 43.5% |
- County results Bilbray: 50–60%
U.S. Representative before election
Brian Bilbray
Republican
Elected U.S. Representative
Brian Bilbray
Republican

=== Predictions ===
| Source | Ranking | As of |
|---|---|---|
| The Cook Political Report | Lean R | November 6, 2006 |
| Rothenberg | Likely R | November 6, 2006 |
| Sabato's Crystal Ball | Lean R | November 6, 2006 |
| Real Clear Politics | Safe R | November 7, 2006 |
| CQ Politics | Lean R | November 7, 2006 |

=== Results ===
California's 50th congressional district, election 2006
| Party | Candidate | Votes | % |
|---|---|---|---|
| Republican | Brian Bilbray (incumbent) | 118,018 | 53.14 |
| Democratic | Francine Busby | 96,612 | 43.50 |
| Libertarian | Paul King | 4,119 | 1.85 |
| Peace and Freedom | Miriam Clark | 3,353 | 1.51 |
| Total votes | | 222,102 | 100.00 |
| Turnout | | | |
| Republican hold | | | |

== District 51 ==
2006 California's 51st congressional district election
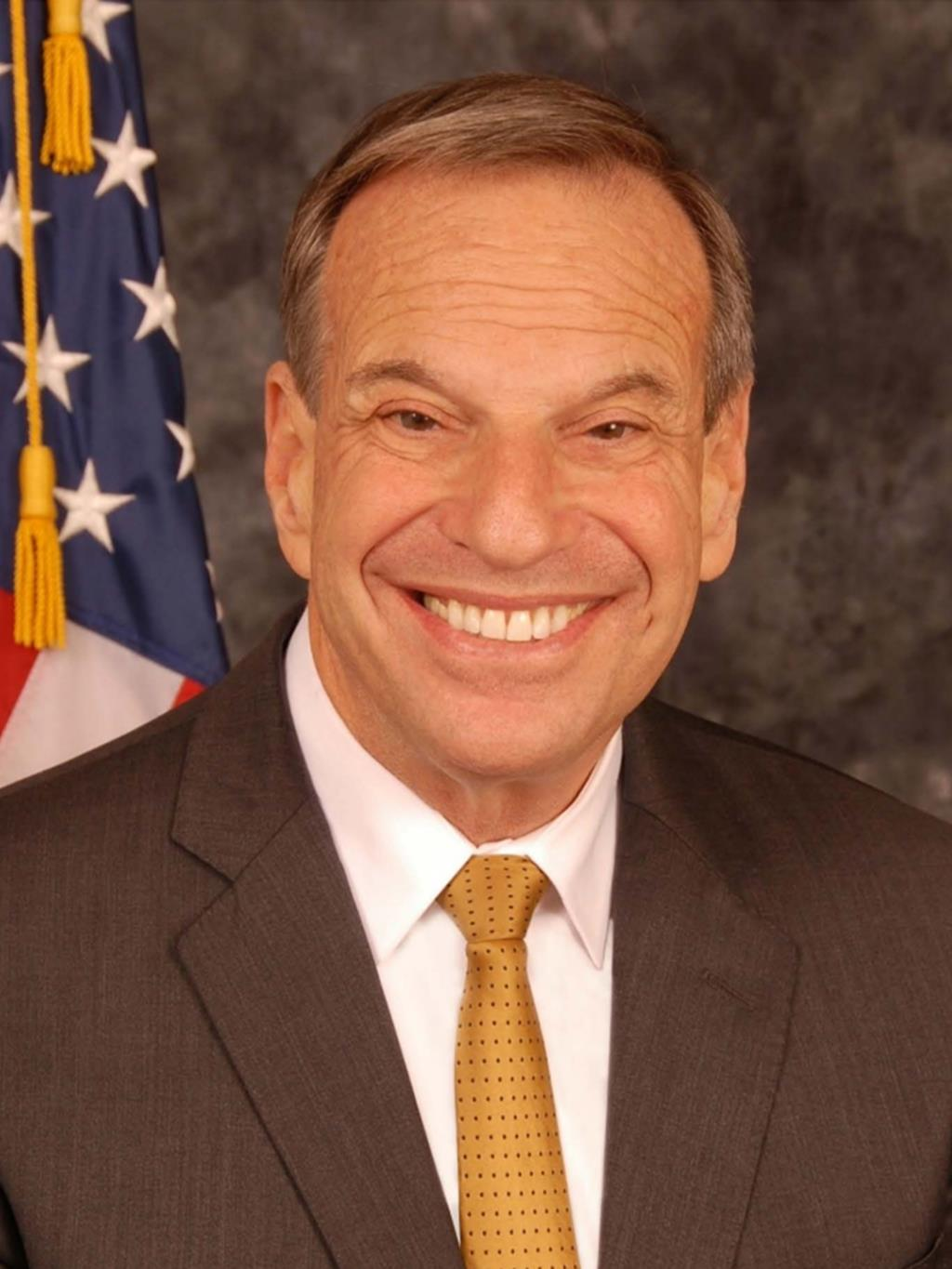

| Nominee | Bob Filner | Blake Miles |
| Party | Democratic | Republican |
| Popular vote | 78,114 | 34,931 |
| Percentage | 67.4% | 30.1% |
- County results Filner: 60–70%
U.S. Representative before election
Bob Filner
Democratic
Elected U.S. Representative
Bob Filner
Democratic

=== Predictions ===
| Source | Ranking | As of |
|---|---|---|
| The Cook Political Report | Safe D | November 6, 2006 |
| Rothenberg | Safe D | November 6, 2006 |
| Sabato's Crystal Ball | Safe D | November 6, 2006 |
| Real Clear Politics | Safe D | November 7, 2006 |
| CQ Politics | Safe D | November 7, 2006 |

=== Results ===
California's 51st congressional district election, 2006
| Party | Candidate | Votes | % |
|---|---|---|---|
| Democratic | Bob Filner (incumbent) | 78,114 | 67.43 |
| Republican | Blake Miles | 34,931 | 30.15 |
| Libertarian | Dan Litwin | 2,790 | 2.41 |
| Independent | David Arguello (write-in) | 4 | 0.00 |
| Total votes | | 115,839 | 100.00 |
| Turnout | | | |
| Democratic hold | | | |

== District 52 ==
2006 California's 52nd congressional district election
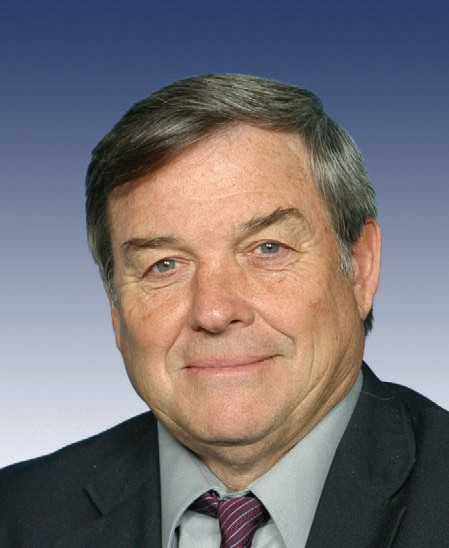

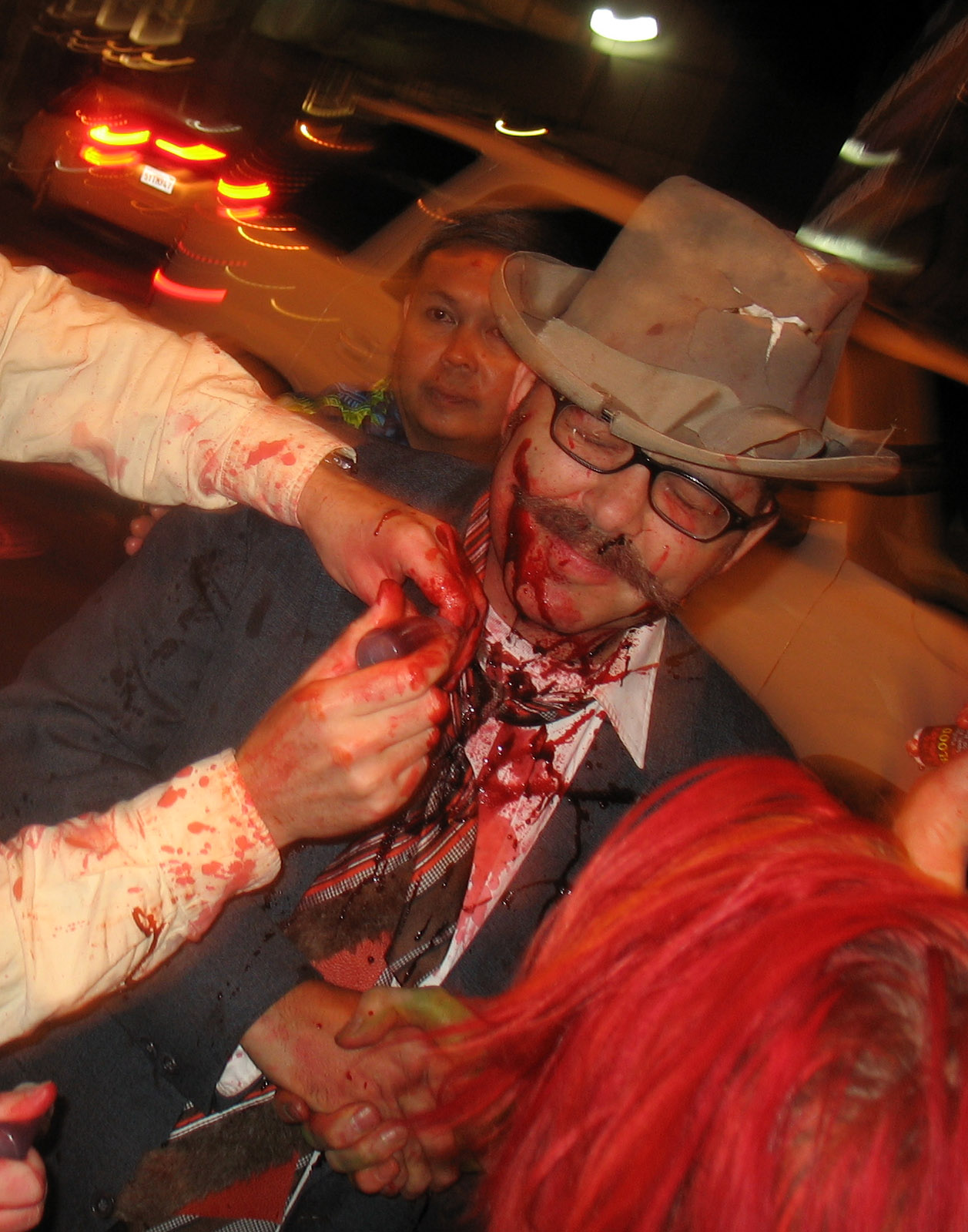
| Nominee | Duncan Hunter | John Rinaldi |
| Party | Republican | Democratic |
| Popular vote | 123,696 | 61,208 |
| Percentage | 64.6% | 32.2% |
- County results Hunter: 60–70%
U.S. Representative before election
Duncan Hunter
Republican
Elected U.S. Representative
Duncan Hunter
Republican

=== Predictions ===
| Source | Ranking | As of |
|---|---|---|
| The Cook Political Report | Safe R | November 6, 2006 |
| Rothenberg | Safe R | November 6, 2006 |
| Sabato's Crystal Ball | Safe R | November 6, 2006 |
| Real Clear Politics | Safe R | November 7, 2006 |
| CQ Politics | Safe R | November 7, 2006 |

=== Results ===
California's 52nd congressional district election, 2006
| Party | Candidate | Votes | % |
|---|---|---|---|
| Republican | Duncan Hunter (incumbent) | 123,696 | 64.64 |
| Democratic | John Rinaldi | 61,208 | 32.16 |
| Libertarian | Michael Benoit | 6,465 | 3.38 |
| Total votes | | 191,369 | 100.00 |
| Turnout | | | |
| Republican hold | | | |

== District 53 ==
2006 California's 53rd congressional district election
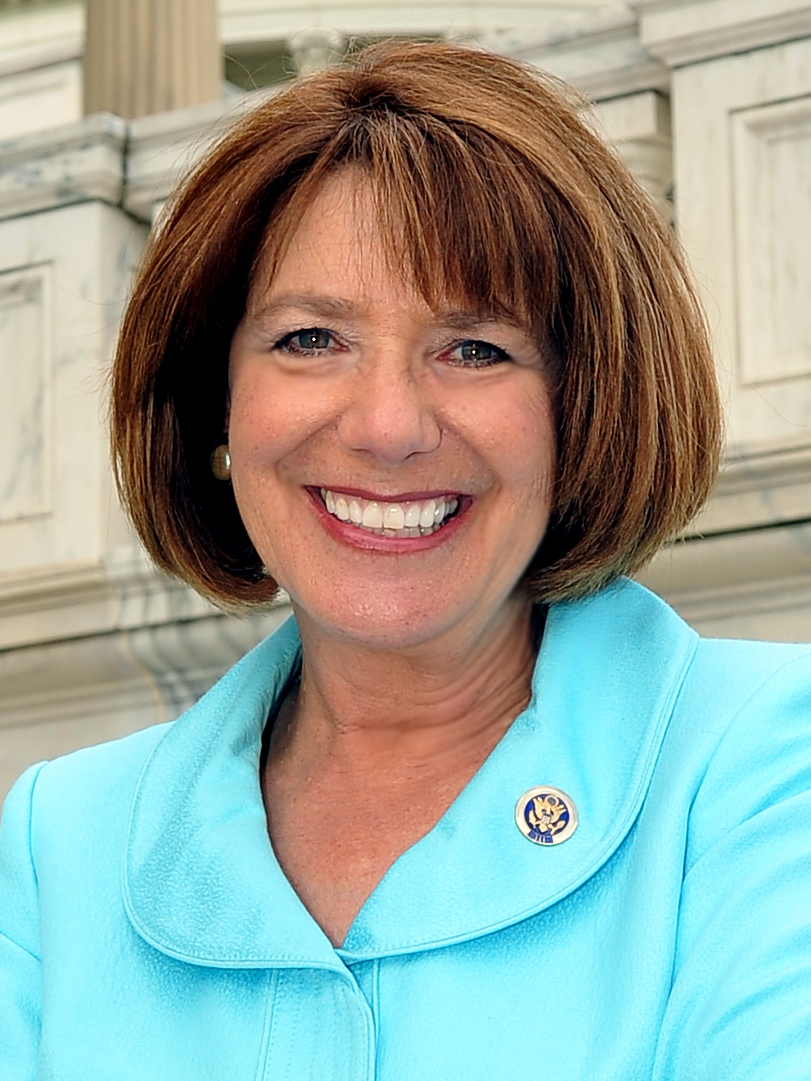

| Nominee | Susan Davis | John Woodrum |
| Party | Democratic | Republican |
| Popular vote | 97,541 | 43,312 |
| Percentage | 67.5% | 30.0% |
- County results Davis: 60–70%
U.S. Representative before election
Susan Davis
Democratic
Elected U.S. Representative
Susan Davis
Democratic

=== Predictions ===
| Source | Ranking | As of |
|---|---|---|
| The Cook Political Report | Safe D | November 6, 2006 |
| Rothenberg | Safe D | November 6, 2006 |
| Sabato's Crystal Ball | Safe D | November 6, 2006 |
| Real Clear Politics | Safe D | November 7, 2006 |
| CQ Politics | Safe D | November 7, 2006 |

=== Results ===
California's 53rd congressional district election, 2006
| Party | Candidate | Votes | % |
|---|---|---|---|
| Democratic | Susan Davis (incumbent) | 97,541 | 67.55 |
| Republican | John Woodrum | 43,312 | 30.00 |
| Libertarian | Ernie Lippe | 3,534 | 2.45 |
| Total votes | | 144,387 | 100.00 |
| Turnout | | | |
| Democratic hold | | | |

== See also ==
- 110th United States Congress
- Political party strength in California
- Political party strength in U.S. states
- United States House of Representatives elections, 2006
