= M24 Chaffee =

American light tank

Light tank M24
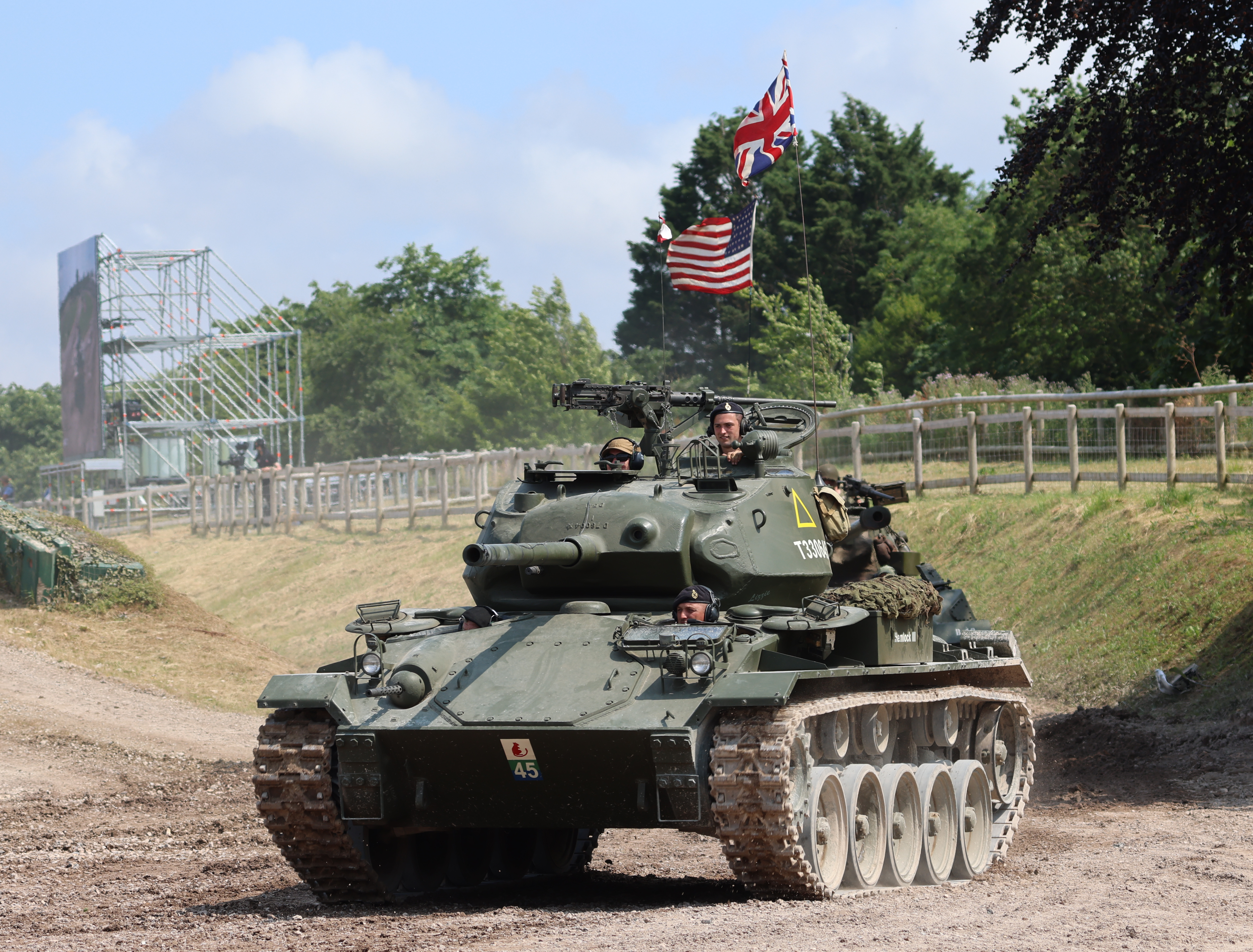
- A preserved M24 at Tankfest 2023
- Type: Light tank
- Place of origin: United States

Service history
- In service: 1944–1953 (U.S. Army)
- Used by: United States and 28 others; see Operators
- Wars: World War II; Korean War; First Indochina War; Algerian War; Ifni War; 1964 Ethiopian–Somali Border War; Indo-Pakistani war of 1965; Vietnam War; Laotian Civil War; Cambodian Civil War; Indo-Pakistani War of 1971; Ethiopian Civil War; Ogaden War

Production history
- Manufacturer: Cadillac; Massey-Harris
- Unit cost: $39,653
- Produced: April 1944–August 1945
- No. built: 4,731

Specifications
- Mass: 40,500 lb (20.3 short tons) (18.37 tonnes)
- Length: 18 ft 3 in (5.56 m) including gun 16 ft 6 in (5.03 m) excluding gun
- Width: 9 ft 10 in (3 m)
- Height: 9 ft 1 in (2.77 m)
- Crew: 5 (commander/radio operator, gunner, loader, driver, assistant driver/bow gunner)
- Armor: 0.40–1.50 in (10–38 mm)
- Main armament: 75 mm gun M6 in mount M64; 48 rounds
- Secondary armament: .50 BMG Browning M2HB machine gun; 440 rounds; 2 × .30-06 Browning M1919A4 machine guns; 3,750 rounds
- Engine: Twin Cadillac Series 44T24; 220 hp (160 kW) (164 kW) at 3,400 rpm (total)
- Power/weight: 12 hp (8.9 kW) / tonne
- Transmission: Hydramatic; 8 speeds forward, 4 reverse
- Suspension: Torsion bar
- Ground clearance: 1 ft 6 in (0.46 m)
- Fuel capacity: 110 US gal (420 L)
- Operational range: 100 mi (160 km)
- Maximum speed: 35 mph (56 km/h)

The M24 Chaffee (officially light tank M24) was an American light tank used during the later part of World War II; it was also used in post–World War II conflicts including the Korean War, and by the French in the War in Algeria and the First Indochina War. In British service it was given the service name Chaffee after the United States Army general, Adna R. Chaffee Jr., who helped develop the use of tanks in the United States armed forces. Although the M41 Walker Bulldog was developed as a replacement, M24s were not mostly removed from U.S. and NATO armies until the 1960s and remained in service with some Third World countries.

== Development and production history ==
British combat experience in the North African campaign identified several shortcomings of the M3 Stuart light tank, especially the performance of its 37 mm cannon. A 75 mm gun was experimentally fitted to a howitzer motor carriage M8 – an M3 tank with a larger turret – and trials indicated that a 75 mm gun on the M5 light tank development of the M3 was possible. The M3/M5 design was dated though, and the 75 mm gun reduced storage space.

The T7 light tank design, which was initially seen as a replacement, grew in weight to more than 25 short tons, taking it out of the light tank classification, and so was designated as the Medium Tank M7. The weight increase without increased power gave it unsatisfactory performance; the program was stopped in March 1943 to allow standardization on a single medium tank – the M4 medium. This prompted the Ordnance Committee to issue a specification for a new light tank, with the same powertrain as the M5A1 but armed with a 75 mm gun.

In April 1943, the Ordnance Corps, together with Cadillac (who manufactured the M5), started work on the new project, designated Light Tank T24. The powerplant and transmission of the M5 were used together with some aspects of the T7. Efforts were made to keep the weight of the vehicle under 20 tons. The armor was extremely light and was sloped to maximize effectiveness. The turret armor was 25 mm thick with a 38 mm thick gun mantlet. The glacis plate was 25 mm thick. Side hull armor thickness varied: the frontal section was 25 mm thick but the rear third of the armor (which covered the engine compartment) was only 19 mm.

A new lightweight 75 mm gun was developed, a derivative of the gun used in the B-25H Mitchell bomber. The gun had the same ballistics as the 75 mm M3 in use by American tanks but used a thinly walled barrel and different recoil mechanism. The design featured 16 in (41 cm) tracks and torsion bar suspension, similar to the slightly earlier M18 Hellcat tank destroyer, which itself started in production in July 1943. The torsion bar system was to give a smoother ride than the vertical volute suspension used on most US armored vehicles. At the same time, the chassis was expected to be a standard used for other vehicles, such as self-propelled guns, and specialist vehicles; known together as the "light combat team". It had a relatively low silhouette and a three-man turret.

On 15 October 1943, the first pilot vehicle was delivered. The design was judged a success and a contract for 1,000 was immediately raised by the Ordnance Department. This was subsequently increased to 5,000. Production began in 1944 under the designation Light Tank M24. It was produced at two sites; from April at Cadillac and from July at Massey-Harris. By the time production was stopped in August 1945, 4,731 M24s had been produced.

== Service history ==
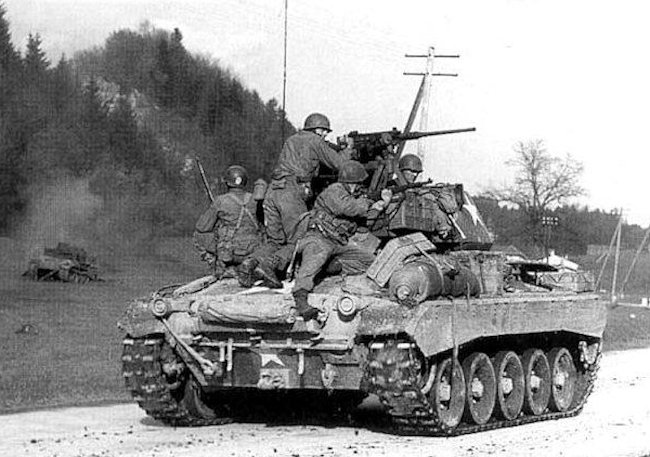
US Army M24 Chaffee moving on the outskirts of Salzburg in May 1945

The M24 Chaffee was intended to replace the ageing and obsolete Light Tank M5 (Stuart), which was used in primarily in reconnaissance roles.

=== World War II ===
European theater

The first 34 M24s reached Europe in November 1944 and were issued to the 2nd Cavalry Group (Mechanized) in France. These were then issued to Troop F, 2nd Cavalry Reconnaissance Squadron and Troop F, 42nd Cavalry Reconnaissance Squadron, which each received seventeen M24s. During the Battle of the Bulge in December 1944, these units and their new tanks were rushed to the southern sector; two of the M24s were detached to serve with the 740th Tank Battalion of the U.S. First Army.

The M24 started to enter widespread use in December 1944, but they were slow in reaching front-line combat units. By the end of the war, the light tank companies of many armored divisions were still mainly equipped with the M3/M5 Stuart. Some armored divisions did not receive their first M24s until the war was over. Aside from the US Army, the British Army was another main user of the Chaffee during the war, with at least several hundred obtained through the US Lend-Lease program. These saw action mainly in northwestern Europe and the North German Plain, where British forces saw action against German troops.

Reports from the American armored divisions that received them, prior to the end of hostilities, were generally positive. Crews liked the improved off-road performance and reliability, but were most appreciative of the 75 mm main gun, which was a vast improvement over the 37 mm. The M24 was inferior in armor to German tanks, but the bigger gun at least gave its crews a much better chance to fight back when it was required, especially in infantry support. The M24's light armor made it vulnerable to virtually all German tanks, anti-tank guns, and hand-held anti-tank weapons. The contribution of the M24 to winning the war in Europe was minor, as too few arrived too late to replace the M5s of the armored divisions. At the end of WWII, the US Army displayed its Chaffees alongside the British Comet tanks and the Soviet IS-3 heavy tank, in the Berlin Victory Parade in 1945.

Pacific theater

The (Light Tank) company, equipped with M24 Light Tanks, is an essential element in any tank battalion. In fire power it is equal to the present Medium Tank Company and can perform missions now assigned to them when defiladed from anti-tank and heavy artillery fire. It can furnish strong fire support either direct or indirect. In a more open type of terrain and enemy situation, such as may be expected on the larger land masses, this company, due to its great mobility combined with strong fire power, will provide excellent reconnaissance, protection of flanks, covering force, as well as direct assault or support by fire. This company is the principal element of the battalion which gives it its flexibility to meet rapidly changing situations.

— 711th Tank Battalion notes, Battle of Okinawa, Page 26 of 41

=== Korean War ===
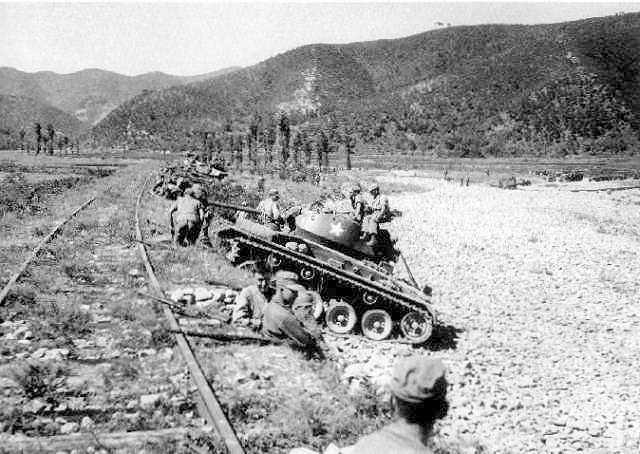
M24 Chaffee light tanks of the US Army's 25th Infantry Division wait for an assault of North Korean T-34-85 tanks at Masan

The M24 was virtually the only tank that the U.S. Far East Command could immediately dispatch to the Korean Peninsula at the time of the Korean War. During the same period, there were a total of four tank battalions (71st, 77th, 78th, and 79th) under the Far East Command, and each battalion maintained one company composed of M24s for the purpose of defending Japan's narrow road network and bridges. The first battle took place on 10 July 1950, when A Company of the 78th Tank Battalion, assigned to the 24th Infantry Division, fought a North Korean tank and destroyed it while losing two.

The M24's 75 mm main gun lacked penetration power against the frontal armor of the T-34-85. In addition, the armor of the M24 could be penetrated by the main guns of enemy tanks, artillery, and even anti-tank rifles used by the North Korean military. Moreover, most of the tanks dispatched from Japan had not been repaired for a long time, so turrets and main guns frequently broke down during battles. A Company of the 78th Tank Battalion, who first arrived on the Korean Peninsula, suffered heavy damage, with only two of the 14 tanks remaining in about a month. This unfavorable situation was resolved in August of the same year when U.S. medium tanks were finally deployed on the Korean Peninsula. All of the tanks units that operated the M24s were replaced with the M4A3E8. Afterward, the M24 was given to the reconnaissance squadron under the tank battalion or the infantry division for most of the period and was used for scouting purposes as it should have been.

=== Non-US service ===
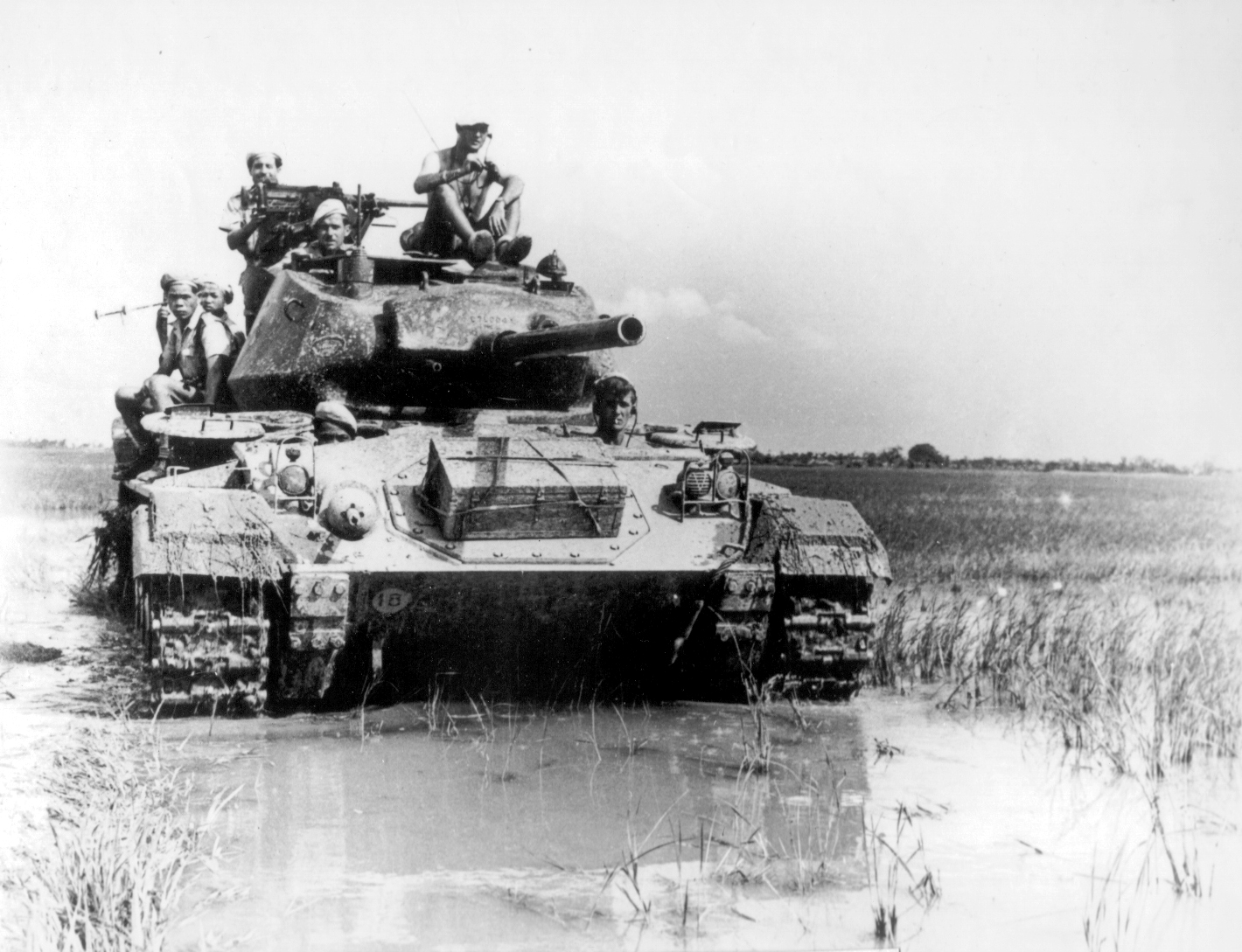
French M24 tanks in Indochina, during the Battle of Dien Bien Phu

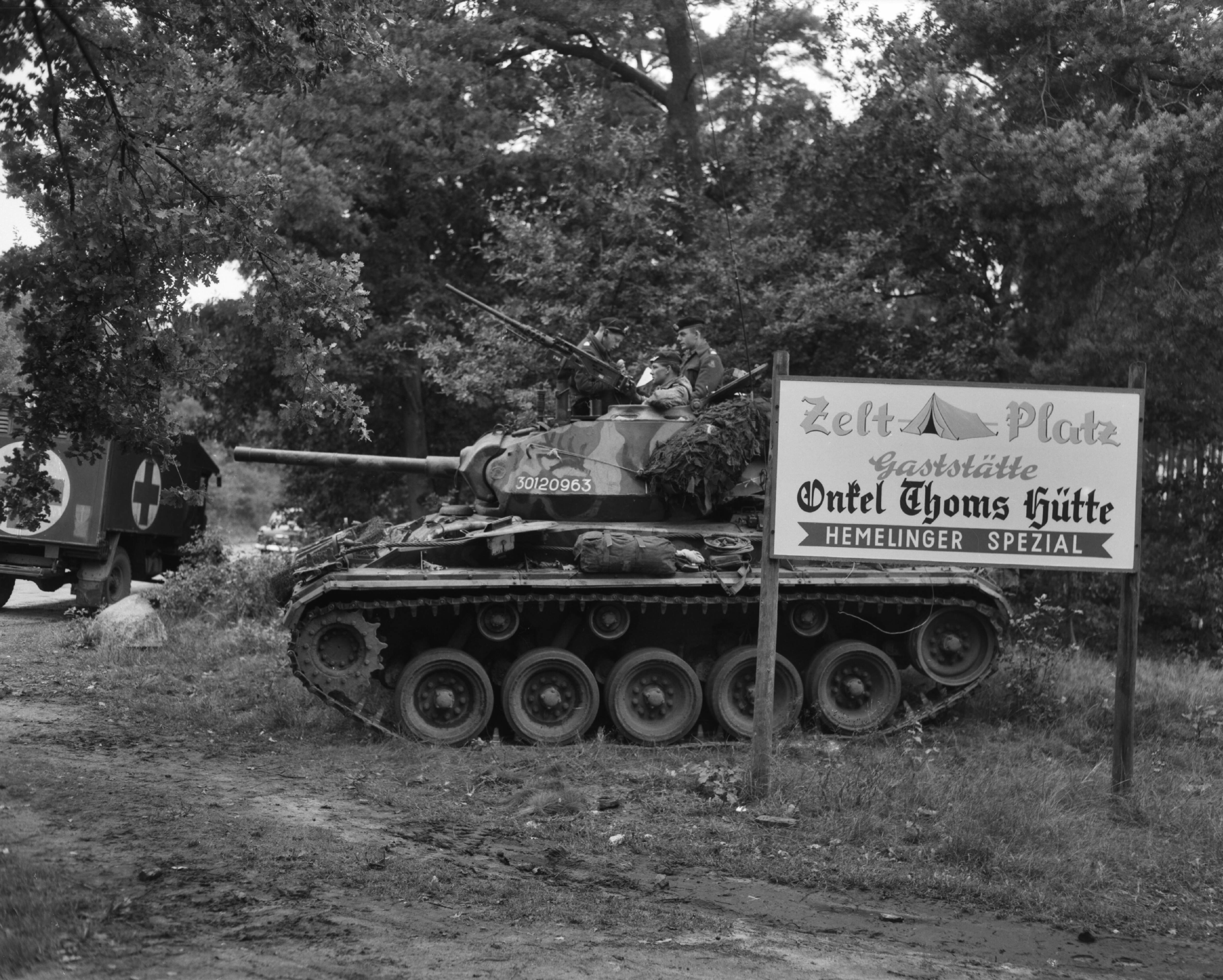
Dutch M24 light tank in West Germany, 1953.

Like other successful World War II designs, the M24 was supplied to many armies around the globe and was used in local conflicts long after it had been replaced in the US Army by the M41 Walker Bulldog.

France employed its M24s in Indo-China in infantry support missions, with good results. They employed ten M24s in the Battle of Dien Bien Phu. In December 1953, ten disassembled Chaffees were transported by air to provide fire support to the garrison. They fired about 15,000 shells in the long siege that followed before the Viet Minh forces finally overcame the camp in May 1954, almost all being entirely worn out and badly damaged by the time the battle was over. France also deployed the M24 in Algeria, with some variants which fought there carrying an AMX-13 turret modified by France. Some former French and US Chaffees are known to have been passed down to the Army of South Vietnam, where they saw service at least until the Battle of Huế, with several serving as fixed gun emplacements outside vital military installations such as airbases.

In February 1964, the Ethiopian Army also deployed M24 Chaffees alongside M75 APCs in the 1964 Ethiopian-Somali Border War to battle at Tog Wajaale, with eight Ethiopian "tanks" reportedly lost in combat.

The last time the M24 is known to have been in action was in the Indo-Pakistani War of 1971, where 66 Pakistani Chaffees stationed in East Pakistan (today's Bangladesh) were lost to Indian Army T-55s, PT-76s, and anti-tank teams, being easy prey for the better-equipped invading Indian forces. Notably, a large-scale attack by Pakistani M24s was defeated by dug-in Indian PT-76s in the crucial Battle of Garibpur just prior to the official onset of the war. However, on Dec. 9, 1971 two platoons of M24s ambushed six Indian PT-76s of A Squadron/45th Cavalry Regiment advancing on Kushtia, knocking out five and delaying capture of the town for two days.

Although both Iran and Iraq had M24s prior to the Iran–Iraq War, there is no report of their use in that conflict. South Korean Chaffees saw limited service during the Korean War, often performing hit-and-run raids on communist forces. Cambodia, Laos, Japan and Taiwan were four other Asian nations to have operated Chaffees aside from South Vietnam, South Korea and Pakistan.

The Greek Army received 85 M24s from the U.S. from 1950 until 1970. The M24s initially were organized in two Tank Regiments numbered 392 and 393. In later years the Tank Regiments were reorganized in Tank Battalions with the same numbers. From 1962 till the early seventies the M24s in Tank Battalions were replaced with M47s and the M24s were used to equip Independent Reconnaissance Companies with an additional 121 M24s received from Italy in 1975. From 1991 till 1995 61 M24s were scrapped due to CFE Treaty limitations. The rest are abandoned in or outside military camps and one M24 is preserved in the Greek Army Tank Museum. One is on display outside the village of Metsovo (Μέτσοβο).

== Variants and related vehicles ==
Light tank T24
Original prototype. Tested at Aberdeen Proving Grounds in January 1944. Was eventually standardized as light tank M24.
Light tank T24E1
Prototype with Continental R-975-C4 engine and Spicer torque converter transmission. One vehicle was converted from the original T24 prototype and tested in October 1944. The vehicle had superior performance compared to the M24 but suffered from transmission reliability problems.
M19 multiple gun motor carriage
Developed from the T65 40 mm GMC (anti-aircraft gun on extended M5 chassis). Lengthened M24 hull with engine moved to center, twin 40 mm Bofors anti-aircraft guns mounted at hull rear (336 rounds). 904 were ordered in August 1944, but only 285 were completed by the end of the war.
M37 105 mm howitzer motor carriage
Developed in 1945. Carried a 105 mm howitzer M4 (126 rounds). Was intended to replace the 105 mm howitzer motor carriage M7. 448 ordered, 316 delivered. Saw service in the Korean War.
M41 howitzer motor carriage (Gorilla)
Engine moved to the center of hull, 155 mm howitzer M1 mounted at rear. 250 ordered, 85 produced. Saw service in the Korean War, with some exported to France
T77 multiple gun motor carriage
Had six .50 (12.7 mm) caliber machine guns mounted in a new designed turret.
T42, T43 cargo tractors
Based on the T33, the T42 had a torque converter transmission from the M18 Hellcat. The M43 was a lightened version of the T42.
T9
Had bulldozer kit installed.

Additionally, the M38 Wolfhound prototype armored car was experimentally fitted with an M24 turret.

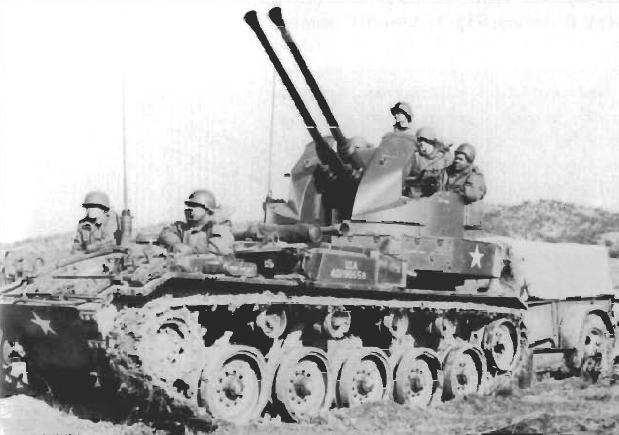
M19 twin 40 mm gun motor carriage

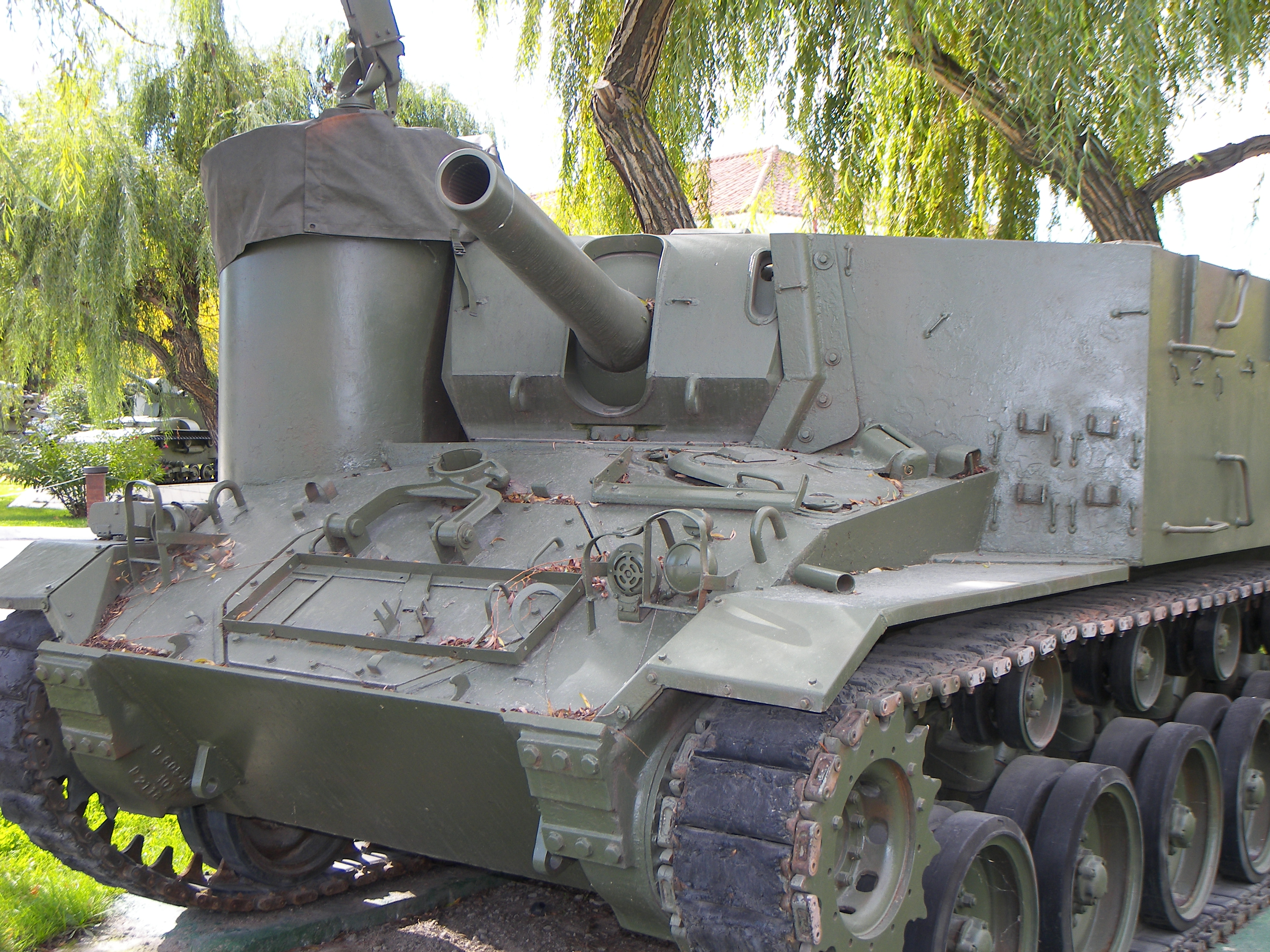
Spanish Army M37 105 mm self-propelled howitzer

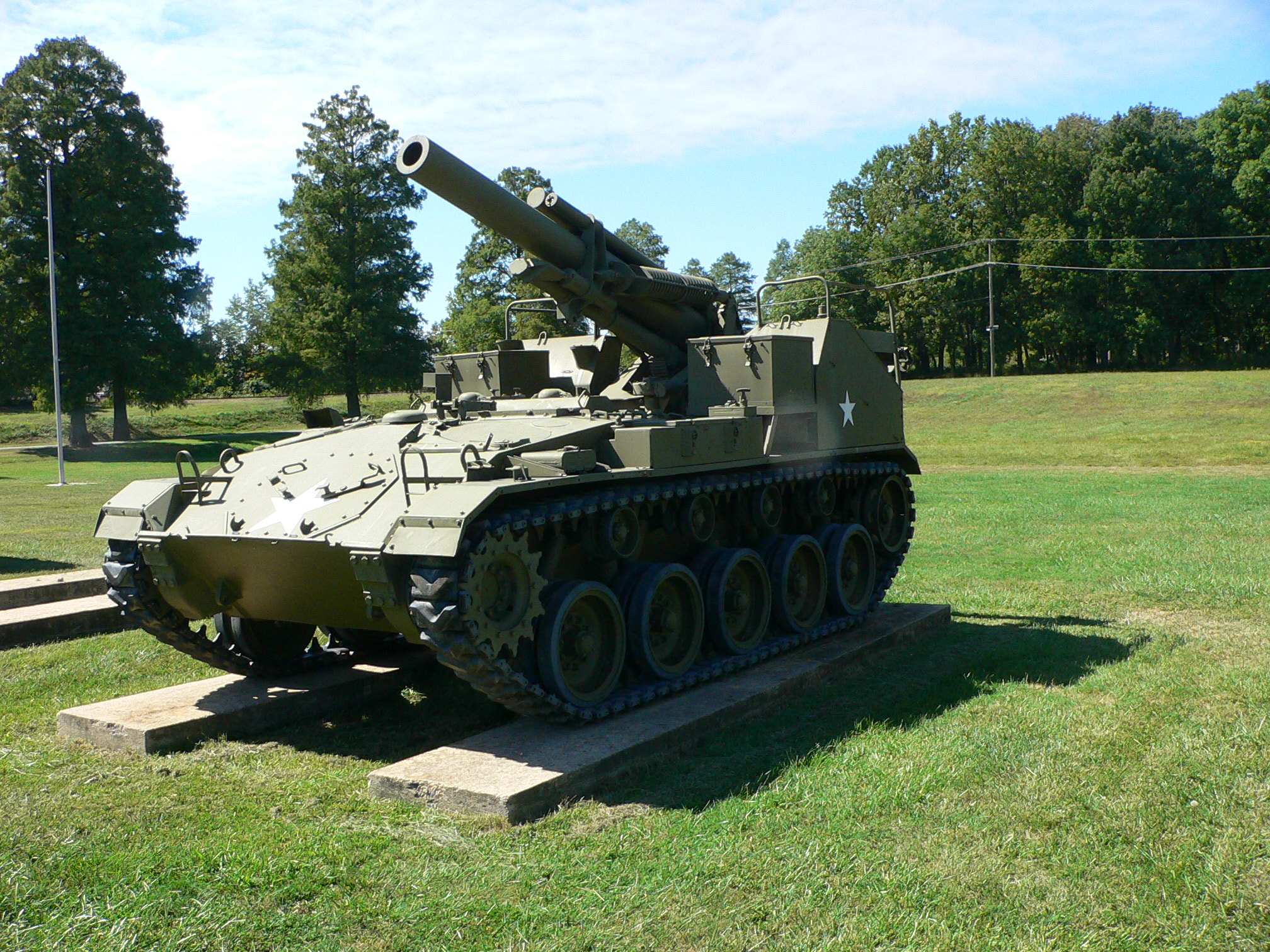
M41 Gorilla in the US Army Ordnance Museum

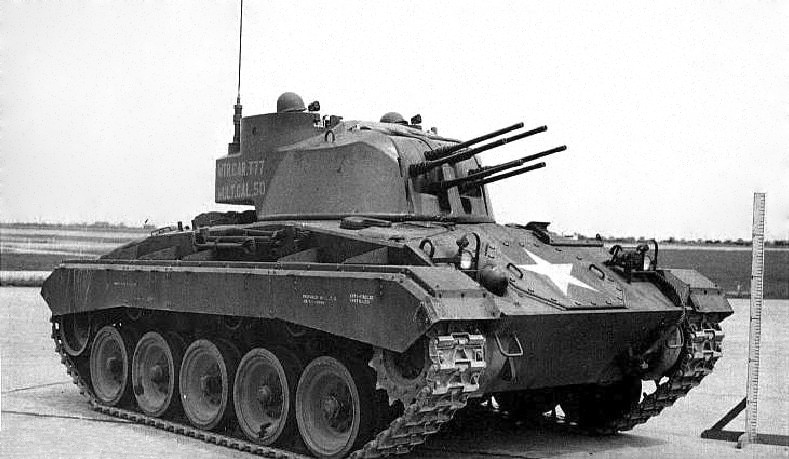
T77 multiple .50 caliber gun motor carriage

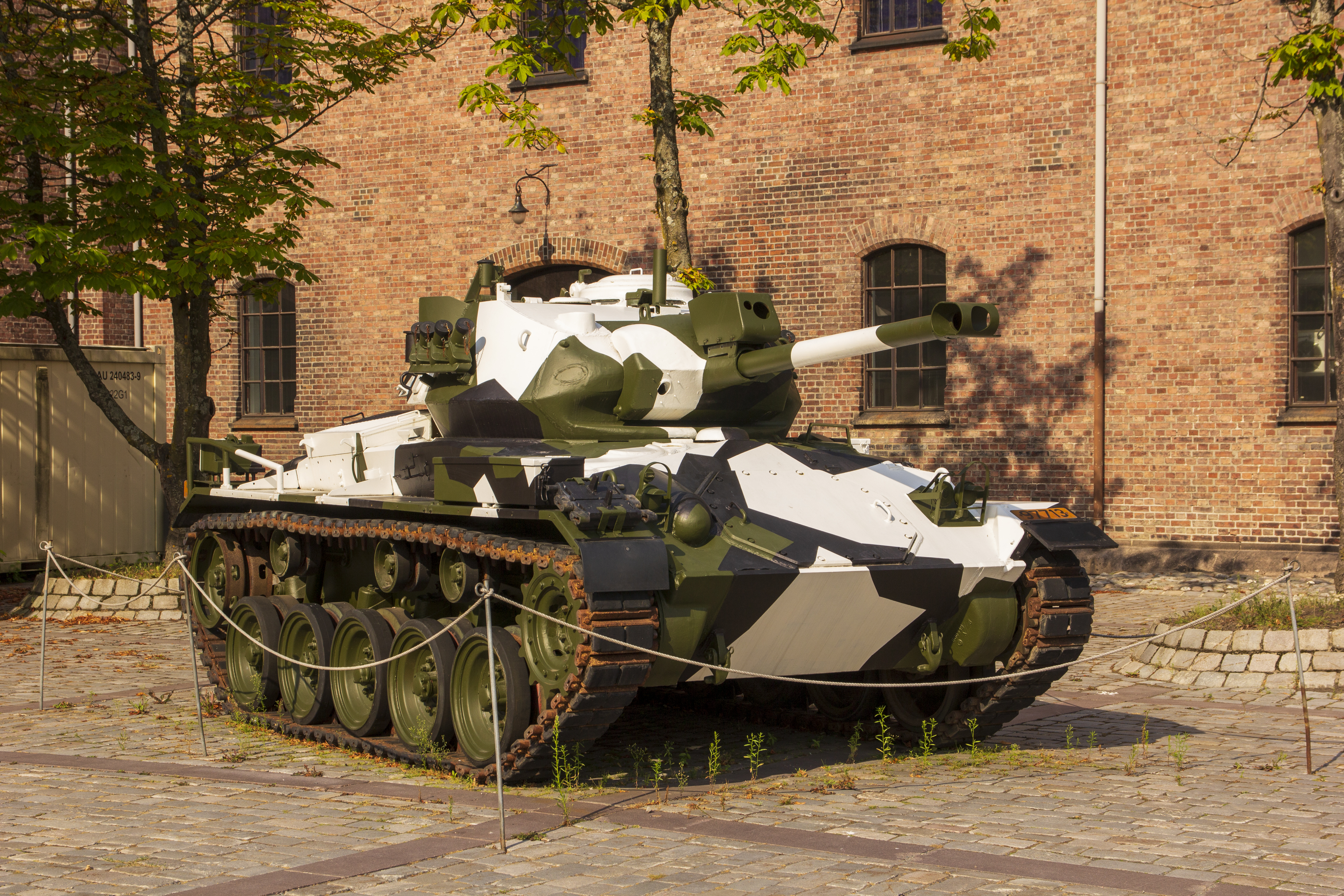
Norwegian Army NM-116 in the Armed Forces Museum

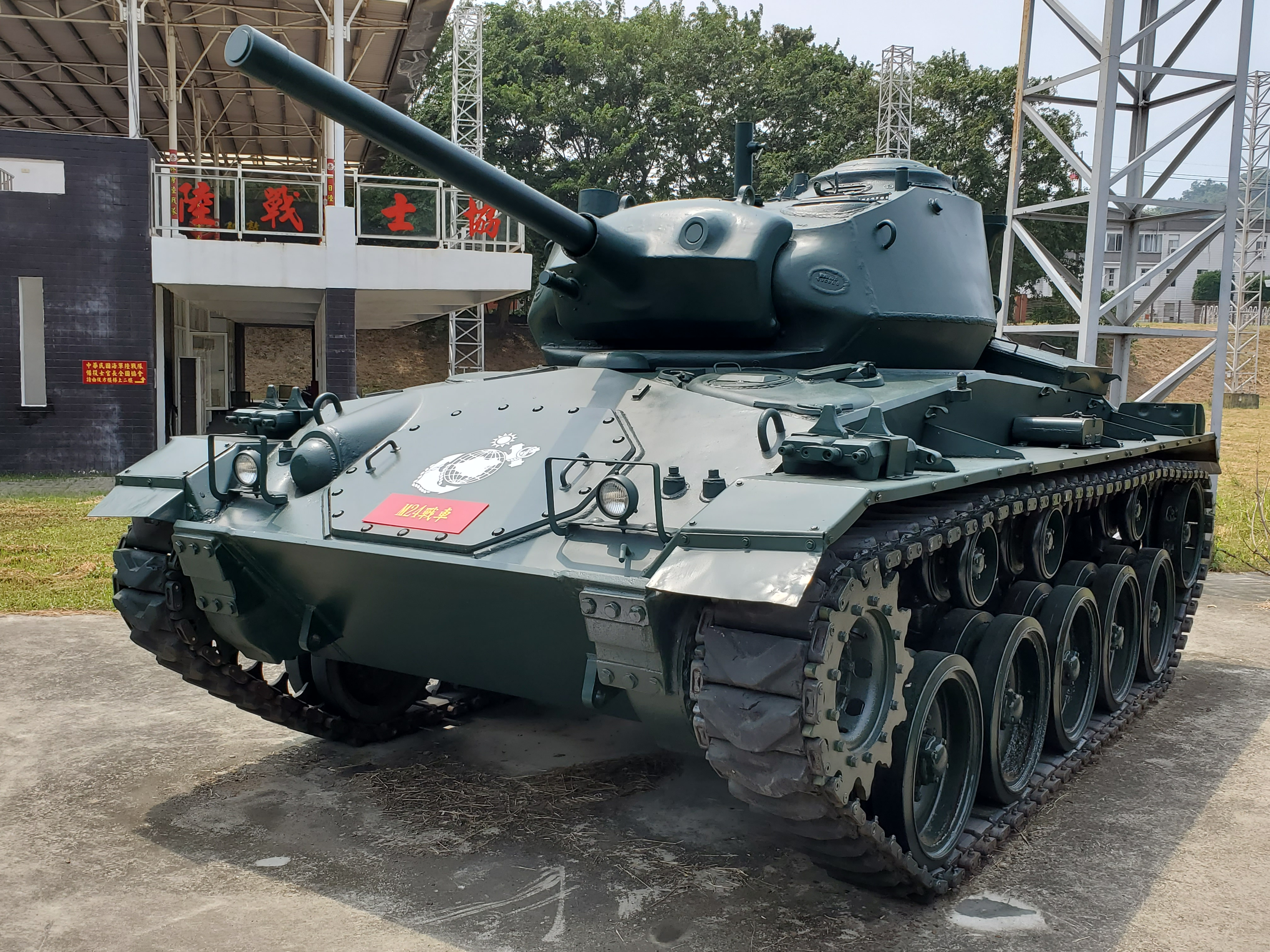
M24 Chaffee in the Museum of Republic of China Marine Corps

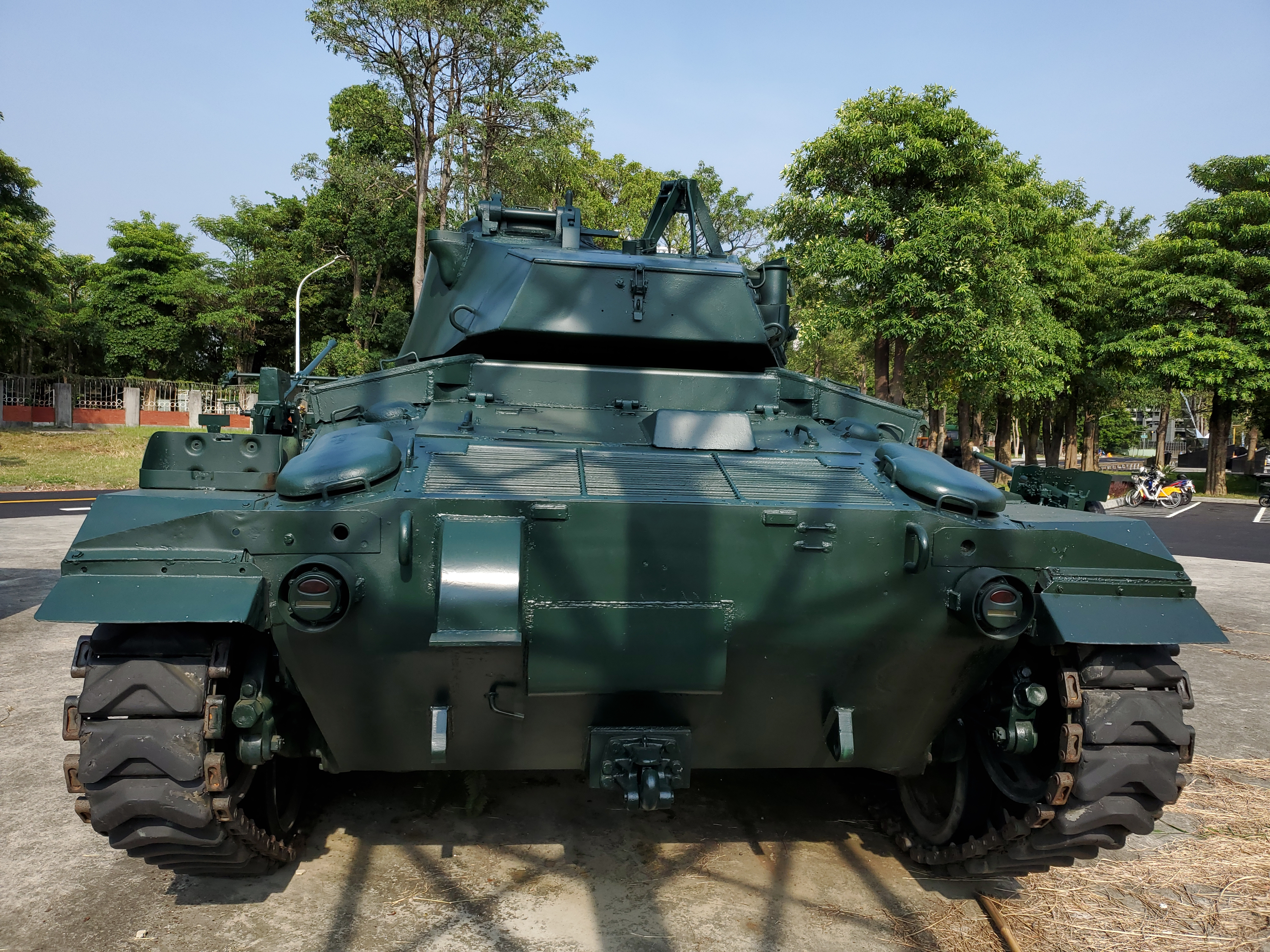
M24 Chaffee rear view

== Foreign variants ==
=== NM-116 ===
In 1972, the Norwegian Army decided to retain 54 of their 123 M24 light tanks as reconnaissance vehicles after they were substantially rebuilt under the designation NM-116. It was calculated that the NM-116 rebuilding program cost only about a third as much as contemporary light tanks.

This program was managed by the firm Thune-Eureka. The American firm NAPCO developed an improved power pack based around the 6V53T diesel engine used in the M113 armored personnel carrier mated to an Allison MT-653 transmission. The original 75 mm Gun M6 L/39 was replaced with a French D-925 90 mm low pressure gun as proposed by the M24 Revalorisé marketed in 1971, with a co-axial 0.50-inch (12.7 mm) AN/M3 heavy machine gun. The bow gunner position was eliminated in favor of ammunition stowage. A new fire-control system was installed, complete with a Simrad LV3 laser rangefinder. Norwegian firms also converted eight M24 light tanks into light armored recovery vehicles to support the NM-116. The NM-116 were retired from service in 1993.

A few unconverted M24s were transferred to the Norwegian Home Guard and used in the defense of the former Fornebu Airport from 1974 well into the 1980s.

=== Other variants ===
The Chilean Army up-gunned their M24s in the mid-1980s to the IMI-OTO 60 mm hyper velocity medium support (HVMS) gun, with roughly comparable performance to a standard 90 mm gun. Chile operated this version until 1999. Uruguay continues to use the M24, modernized with new engines and 76 mm guns which can fire armor-piercing, fin stabilized, discarding sabot (APFSDS) rounds. In the mid-1950s, in an attempt to improve the anti-tank performance of the vehicle, some French M24s had their turrets replaced with those of the AMX-13 light tank. AMX-13 variants with Chaffee turrets also existed. In the late-1960s, the JSDF modified a single M24 with four Type 64 ATGMs in order to improve its anti-tank capabilities.

== Operators ==
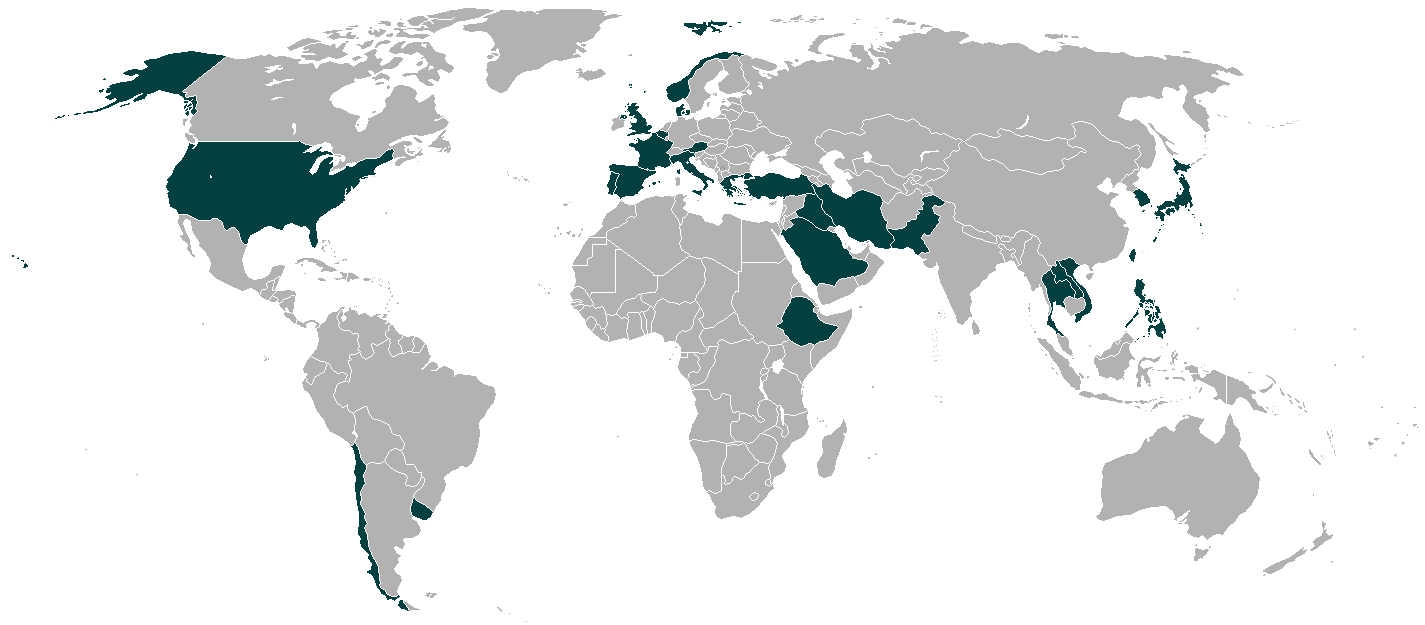
Former operators of the M24

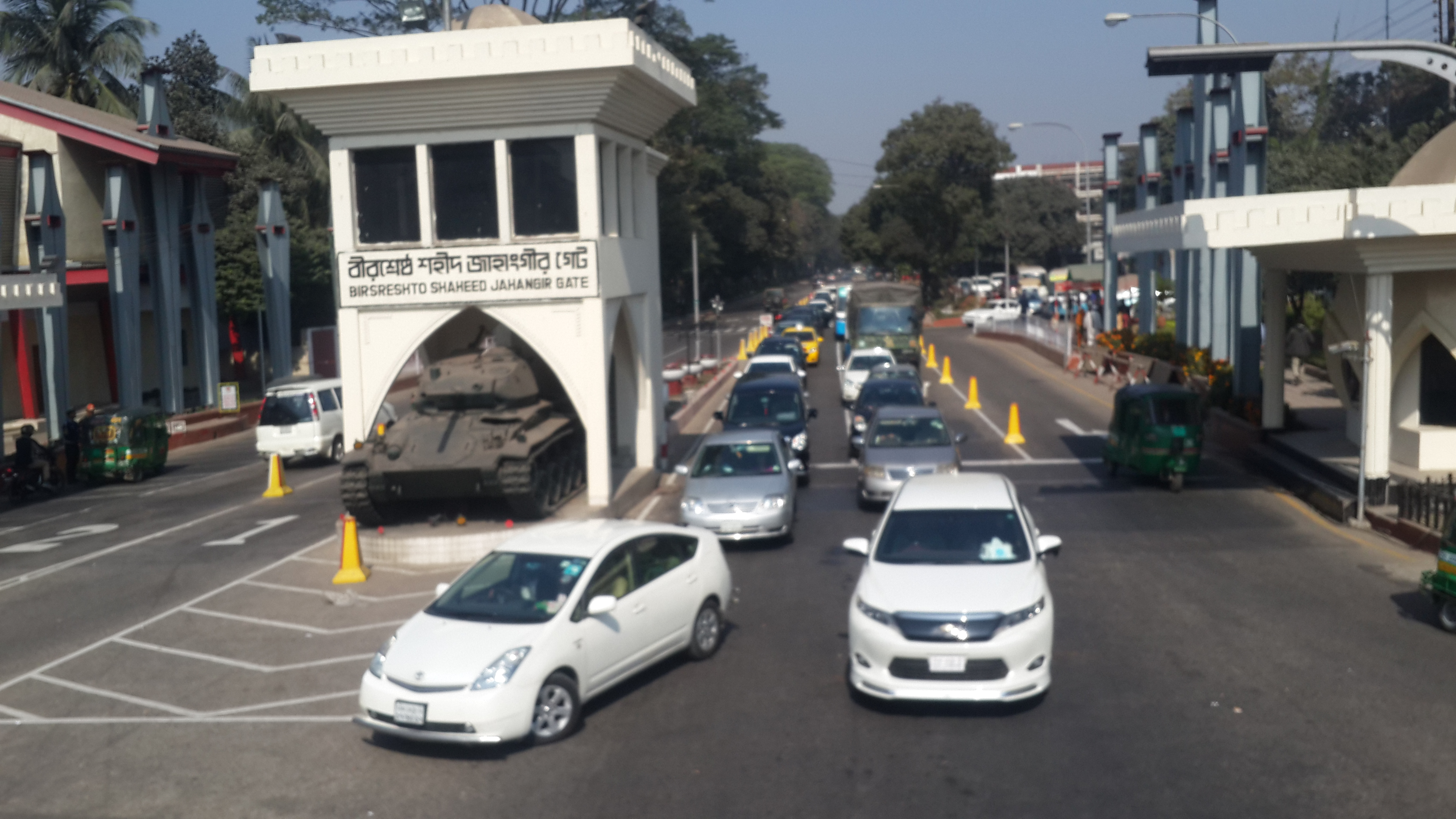
An ex-Bangladesh Army M24 Chaffee on display at Birsreshto Shaheed Jahangir Gate of Dhaka Cantonment.

=== Former operators ===
- Bangladesh – 10 second-hand M24 Chaffees captured from the Pakistan Army during the Bangladesh Liberation War.
- Belgium – 224 were bought through NATO.
- Cambodia – 36 were purchased.
- Canada – 32 purchased by the Canadian government in 1947 along with 294 M4A2E8 (76 mm) Shermans.
- Chile - 21 received in 1960s from USA.
- Denmark – 63 were bought through NATO.
- Ethiopia – 34 were purchased.
- France – 1254 vehicles were purchased through NATO.
- Greece – 170 were bought through NATO.
- Iran – 180 were purchased.
- Iraq – 78 were purchased.
- Italy – 518 were bought through NATO.
- Japan – entered service in 1952; last ones taken out of service by 1974.
- Laos – Four were purchased.
- Netherlands – about 50 in use until 1962. Replaced by the AMX-13.
- Norway – 123 entered service in the 1950s, last Chaffees were taken out of service in 1993.
- Pakistan – 132 were purchased.
- Philippines – Seven Chaffees assigned to the Recon Company of the 10th BCT, PEFTOK during the Korean War. Two known were on static display in Lingayen, Pangasinan.
- Portugal – 16 were bought through NATO.
- Republic of Korea – 22 M24s were used for training by the 55th Tank Company of the Army in late 1952 for a temporary time. Later delivered to Taiwan.
- Saudi Arabia – 52 were purchased.
- South Vietnam (1954-1975) 137 were purchased.
- Vietnam – After conquest of Republic of South Vietnam in 1975
- Spain – 31 were purchased through NATO. Used during Ifni War.
- Thailand – 20 were purchased.
- Taiwan
- Turkey – 238 were bought through NATO.
- United Kingdom – 302 were purchased.
- United States
- Uruguay – 17 upgraded, retired from the Armoured Infantry in 2018 and replaced by 25 M41C, donated from Brazil.
- USSR – Received two M24s through Lend-Lease.

== See also ==
- List of "M" series military vehicles
- G-numbers
