= M108 howitzer =

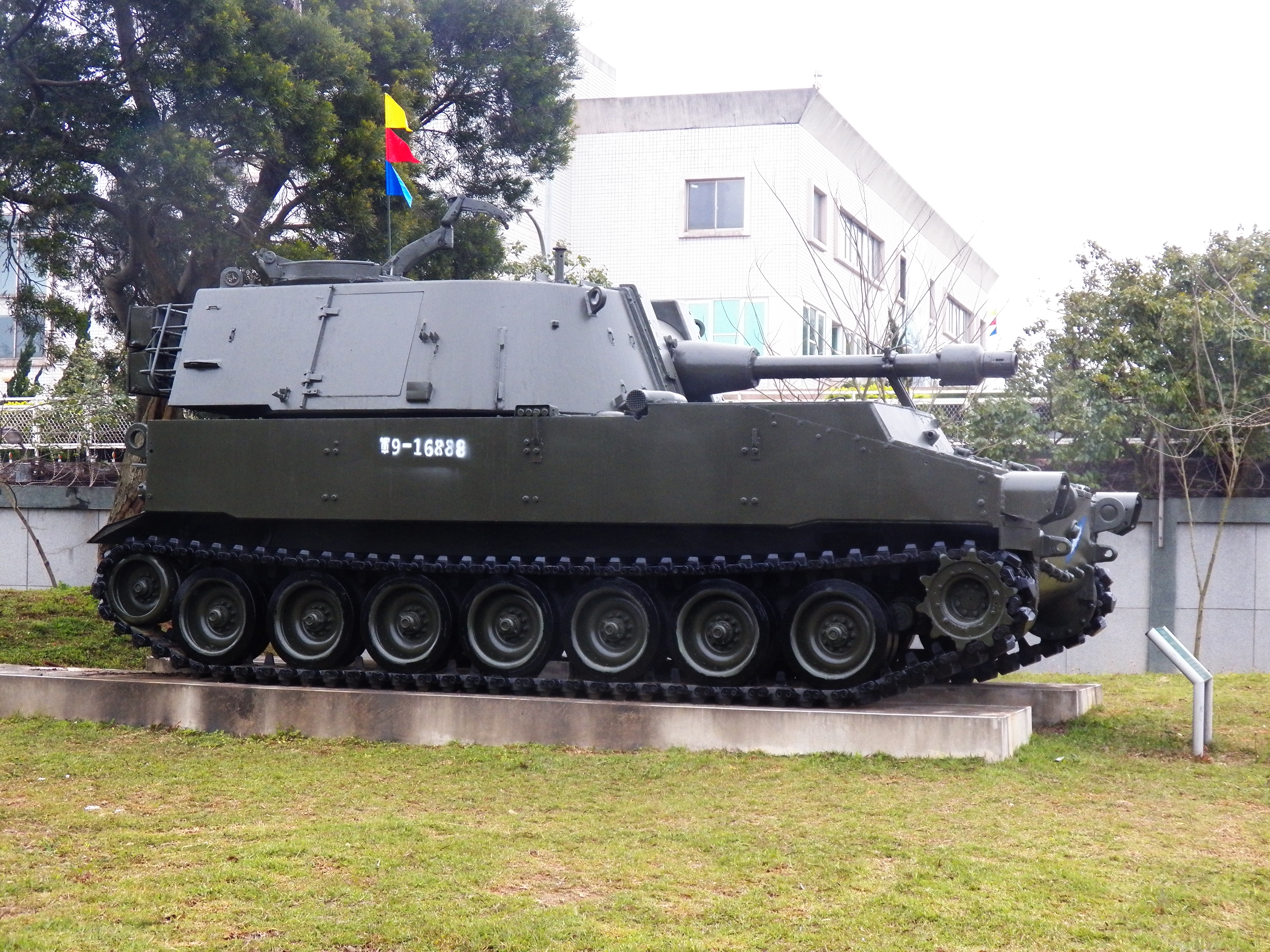
- A Taiwanese M108 self-propelled howitzer
- Type: Self-propelled gun
- Place of origin: United States

Service history
- In service: 1962–1975
- Wars: Vietnam War

Production history
- Manufacturer: Cadillac Motor Car Division of General Motors Corp

Specifications
- Mass: 21 t (20 long tons; 20 short tons)
- Length: 6.11 m (20 ft 1 in)
- Barrel length: 3.15 m (10 ft 4 in) L/30
- Width: 3.15 m (10 ft 4 in)
- Height: 3.28 m (10 ft 9 in)
- Crew: 5
- Shell: 105x372R semi-fixed, semi-fixed cartridge
- Caliber: 105 mm caliber
- Breech: vertical sliding block
- Elevation: 6 to + 75 degrees
- Traverse: 360°
- Rate of fire: 3-4 rounds/min
- Effective firing range: Conventional: 11.5 km (7 mi)
- Armor: 31.8 mm (1 in)
- Main armament: M103 105 mm howitzer (87 rounds)
- Secondary armament: .50 caliber (12.7 mm) M2 machine gun
- Engine: Detroit Diesel turbocharged 8V-71T 8-cylinders 425 hp (300 kW)
- Suspension: torsion-bar
- Operational range: 360 km (200 mi)
- Maximum speed: 56 km/h (30 mph)

The M108 howitzer is an American self-propelled 105 mm howitzer, first introduced in the early 1960s as a replacement for the M52 self-propelled howitzer.

The M108 was powered by a Detroit Diesel turbocharged 8V-71T 8-cylinders 405 hp engine. It used the same hull and turret as the 155 mm M109 self-propelled howitzer, and components of the M113 armored personnel carrier. The M108 was phased out soon after the American intervention in the Vietnam War, as the M109's 155 mm calibre was considered better fitted for modern war.

The M108 was used by few NATO countries, with the M109 being a more popular vehicle among militaries.

== Operational history ==
The M108 howitzer's sole use in combat occurred in the Vietnam War. M108s equipped the first U.S. Army field artillery unit deployed to the conflict, when the 3-6 Field Artillery Battalion was deployed to Pleiku on June 17, 1966. This was soon followed by the 1-40th Field Artillery Battalion to Dong Ha Combat Base in October, 1966. M108s were generally employed from fortified fire bases providing artillery support to units in the field. Because M108 and M109 howitzers could traverse their main gun 360 degrees, unlike towed artillery, they were ideal for holding fire-base positions, which might be subject to attack from any direction. Both M108 battalions were withdrawn and phased out of U.S. Army service in 1975.

== General characteristics ==
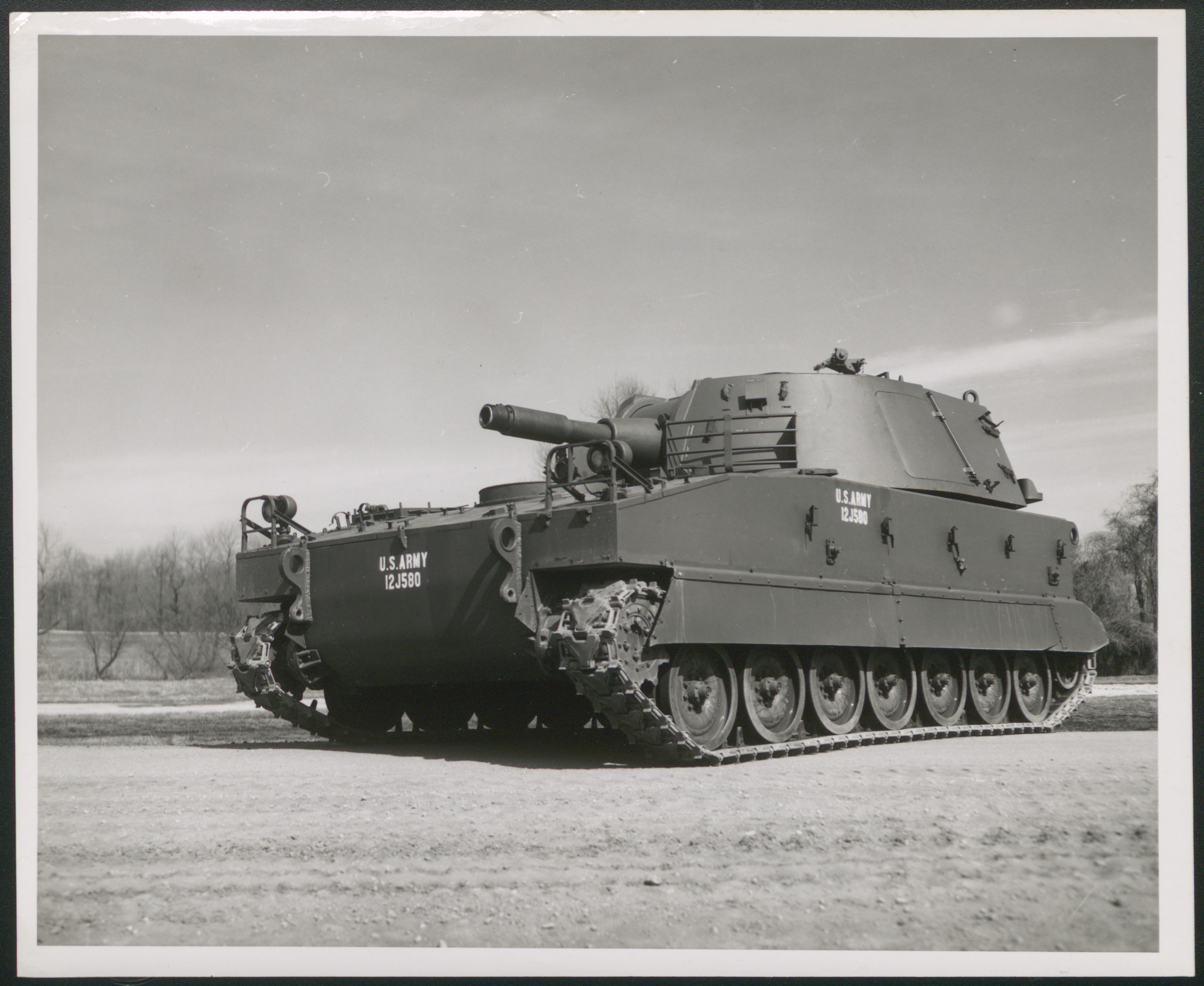
The M108 in 1961

- Length: 6.11 m
- Width: 3.15 m
- Height: 3.28 m
- Weight: 21 t
- Speed: 56 km/h (35 mph)
- Range: 360 km
- Crew: 5
- Armament:
  - Primary: M103 105 mm howitzer
  - Secondary: .50 caliber (12.7 mm) M2 machine gun
- Rate of fire: 4 rounds/min
- Shooting range: 11.5 km (HE) 15 km (HERA)

== Users ==
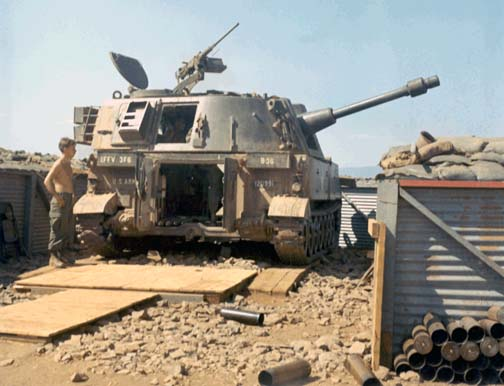
An M108 self-propelled howitzer in Vietnam

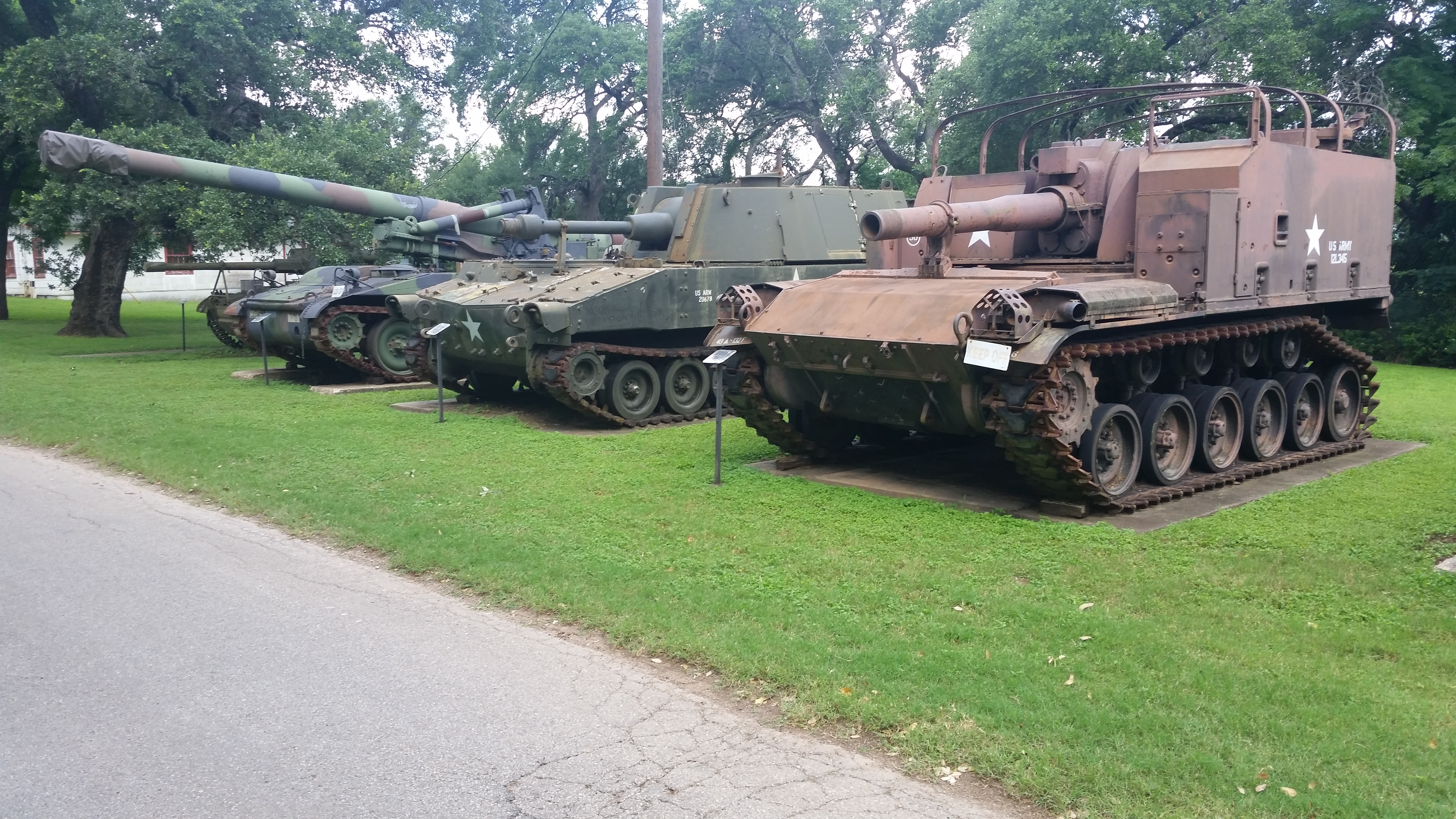
M108 (middle) at the Texas Military Forces Museum

=== Current users ===
- Chile: Chilean Army 21 M108 VBCL (Véhicule Blindé de Commandement et Liaison) (Former Belgian Army).
- Uruguay: National Army of Uruguay 10 M108AP.
- Paraguay: Paraguayan Army 6 M108AP

=== Former users ===
- Australia: Lent by US Army for Australian Defense Force during the Vietnam War.
- Belgium: Belgian Army: 95, until the 1980s.
- Brazil: Brazilian Army 72 M108AP, withdrawn, 10 donated to Uruguay. 6 donated to Paraguay.
- Cambodia: Khmer National Army: withdrawn
- Spain: Spanish Army: 48, withdrawn
- Taiwan: Republic of China Army: 100
- Turkey: Turkish Army: 26 M108T withdrawn
- United States: US Army withdrawn.
- Tunisia: Tunisian Army 48.

== Comparable weapons ==
- FV433 Abbot SPG - British 105mm SPG

== See also ==
"Weapons of the Field Artillery" (1966).

- List of U.S. military vehicles by model number
- List of U.S. military vehicles by supply catalog designation SNL G-296
- M7 Priest – (United States)
- M37 105 mm howitzer motor carriage – (United States)
