= 60mm HVMS =

Self-loading autocannon

The 60mm HVMS (High Velocity Medium Support) gun is a self-loading autocannon jointly developed by IMI Systems of Israel and OTO Melara of Italy. It was designed to be mounted on light armoured vehicles to provide an anti-armour capability using high-velocity sub-calibre kinetic ammunition.

== Overview ==
The 60mm HVMS (60x410mmR)autocannon was designed as an infantry support gun mounted on light armored vehicles.

The project commenced in 1977, originally as a joint development between IMI Systems of Israel and OTO Melara of Italy, whereby IMI Systems were expected to develop the gun and ammunition, and OTO Melara the autoloader and a lightweight two-man turret which could be mounted on a variety of different armored fighting vehicles (AFV). However, both companies went their own way developing their own versions, although each retained the same cartridge case dimensions. The IMI Systems version is known as the High-Velocity Medium Support (HVMS) gun, while the OTO Melara version is known as the High Velocity Gun System (HVGS).

Despite being judged a success by IMI Systems, the gun did not enter service with Israel, and the only export sale was in 1983 to Chile to upgrade M24 Chaffee and M50 Super Sherman tanks. OTO Melara's version was proposed for fitment to a variant of the Italian Army's Dardo infantry fighting vehicle (which the company co-developed with Iveco), but as of 2021, this proposal has not eventuated. The 60mm HVMS remained in active service with the Chilean Army from 1983 to 2002 and was still being used for training activities until 2005.

== Design ==
The gun features a barrel with a bore of 60 millimetres (2.36 in) and a length of 70 calibers (4.2 metres), with a fume extractor approximately halfway down its length. The barrel is fabricated using the autofrettage method to allow the wall to be thin but extremely strong. A hydro-spring recoil system employs a spring surrounding the breach-end of the barrel which is protected by a shroud and a truncated rubber sleeve, allowing quick barrel changes as the gun and recoil system can be removed/installed as a single unit.

Although originally designed with an automatic loading system, the gun can also be manually loaded. The automatic loader is recoil-operated and features a vertical magazine with capacity differing between the IMI Systems and OTO Melara versions. Rounds can be fired individually or in a three-round burst, or in the case of the OTO Melara version, in full automatic with a maximum rate of fire of 30 rounds per minute. Manual loading consists of the traditional method of inserting the shells into the vertically-sliding breach by hand, augmented by hydraulic assistance. Manually loaded, the rate of fire is up to 12 rounds per minute with a reloading time of three seconds between firings. Firing is by an electrically actuated system.

The gun was originally designed to be installed in the T60/70 turret, a lightweight two-man turret which also contained a 7.62mm machine gun and four electronically operated smoke dischargers mounted on each side. The turret could be fitted to a number of light armoured vehicles, and was trialled by the IDF on the M113 armoured personnel carrier, and by Italy in the Fiat Type 6616 4x4 armoured car. However, this turret was not produced and any operational vehicles which received the gun, such as those of the Chilean Army, had it fitted to existing turrets modified accordingly.

The gun can fire both Armor-Piercing Fin-Stabilized Discarding Sabot-Tracer (APFSDS-T) and High-Explosive (HE) 60x410mmR ammunition. An inert training round is also available.

== Performance ==
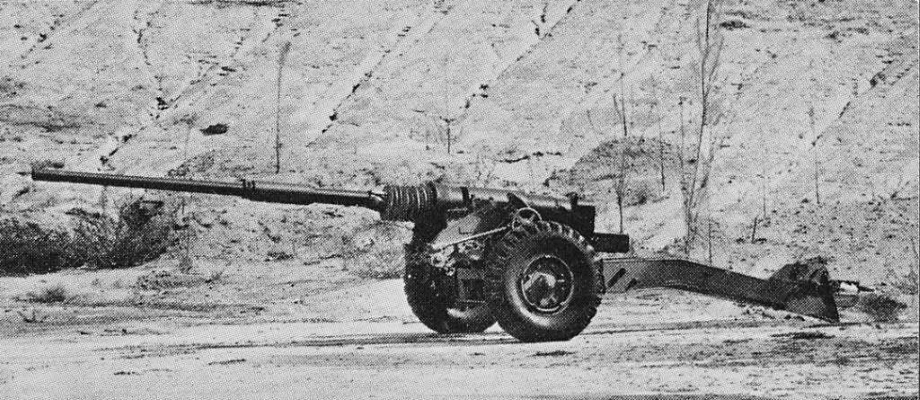
HVMS 60mm gun on 6-pounder carriage

For testing, the gun was fitted to a British QF 6-pounder gun carriage and fired against static Russian T-62 range targets.

The APFSDS-T ammunition was capable of penetrating 120 mm of rolled homogeneous armour sloped at 60 degrees at a range of 2 kilometres (1.2 mi). Rounds were measured leaving the barrel travelling at 1,600 metres per second (5,300 ft/s), losing only 91 metres per second (300 ft/s) after the first kilometer of travel. The rounds were able to penetrate the armor of a T-62 from any angle as well as the side armor (15–79 millimetres (0.59–3.11 in) thick) of two T-62s arranged side-by-side at 2,000 metres (2,187 yd) and was highly accurate at distances of over 2,500 metres (2,734 yd). The 60mm HVMS APFSDS-T rounds performed better than the APDS rounds fired from the Royal Ordnance L7 105 mm gun.

== Vehicles fitted with the gun ==
The gun was mounted on the following vehicles in either a prototype or demonstration, or operational capacity:

- B1 Centauro wheeled tank destroyer (prototype only) (Note: This was possibly the same vehicle as the prototype Freccia IFV fitted with the gun, as the Freccia is a modified version of the Centauro in Italian service.)
- BWP-2000 infantry fighting vehicle (prototype only)
- Dardo infantry fighting vehicle / C13-60 light tank / VCC-80 (prototype only)
- Fiat Type 6616 armoured car (prototype only)
- M24 Chaffee light tank
- M41 Walker Bulldog light tank
- M-60 Sherman medium tank
- Marder infantry fighting vehicle (prototype only)
- M113 HVMS Israeli armoured personnel carrier (prototype only)
- MOWAG Piranha IB 6×6 wheeled infantry fighting vehicle (prototype only)
- VBM Freccia wheeled infantry fighting vehicle (prototype only)

== Operators ==
- Chilean Army: In 1983, the 60mm HVMS was fitted to M24 Chaffee and M-50 Sherman tanks, which were known at the time, as the M-60 Sherman tanks. It is believed that when the M24 Chaffee's were withdrawn from active service in 2002, although they were still used for training activities until 2005. The 60mm HVMS autocannons was fitted to one prototype M41 Walker Bulldog and one prototype Piranha 6x6 IFV that was trialed. As of 2022, it is uncertain as to whether any vehicles armed with this autocannon remain in active service.

== Specifications ==
=== Ammunition ===
The following specifications are for APFSDS-T (Armor-Piercing Fin-Stabilized Discarding Sabot-Tracer) ammunition:

- weight:
  - complete round: 6 kg (13 lb 4 oz)
  - projectile: 1.35 kg (3 lb 0 oz)
  - sub-projectile: 870 g (31 oz)
- length:
  - complete round: 620 mm (24.41 in)
  - projectile: 292 mm (11.50 in)
- sub-projectile diameter: 17 mm (0.669 in)
- muzzle velocity: 1,620 m/s (5,300 ft/s)

The following specifications are for HE (High-Explosive) ammunition:

- weight:
  - complete round: 7.2 kg (15 lb 14 oz)
  - projectile: 2.9 kg (6 lb 6 oz)
- length: 640 mm (25.20 in)
- muzzle velocity: 815 m/s (2,670 ft/s)
- fuse: point detonating, base detonating, proximity, and delayed

=== Gun ===
The following specifications are for the gun assembly (i.e. barrel and breech), less the mounts:

- bore: 60mm
- calibers: 70
- length: 4.2 metres (13 ft 9 in)
- weight:
  - IMI Systems: 700 kilograms (1,543 lb)
  - OTO Melara: 1,000 kilograms (2,205 lb)
- recoil system: hydro-spring
- recoil force: 9,000 kilograms (19,842 lb)
- recoil travel: 270 millimetres (10.630 in)
- rifling: right hand, 22 grooves, 1 in 30 turns per calibres
- firing: electrical
- firing modes: single shot, burst, full auto
- max. rate of fire: 30 rounds per minute

=== Turret ===
The following specifications are for the T60/70 turret originally designed to house the gun:

- material: aluminium
- length: 6.165 metres (20 ft 3 in)
- width: 2.1 metres (6 ft 11 in)
- height above turret ring: 661 millimetres (26.02 in)
- depth below turret ring: 1,162 millimetres (45.75 in)
- weight:
  - without gun: 2,200 kilograms (4,850 lb)
  - fitted and loaded: 5,000 kilograms (11,023 lb)
- elevation: electrically operated, -6 to +50 degrees
- traverse: electrically operated, 360 degrees
- sight magnifications:
  - gunner's: x8
  - commander's: x2.5, x10
- power supply: 24V
- crew: 2

A manual version (i.e. non-electrically operated) was also made available.
