= 75 mm gun M2–M6 =

Standard American tank guns of the Second World War

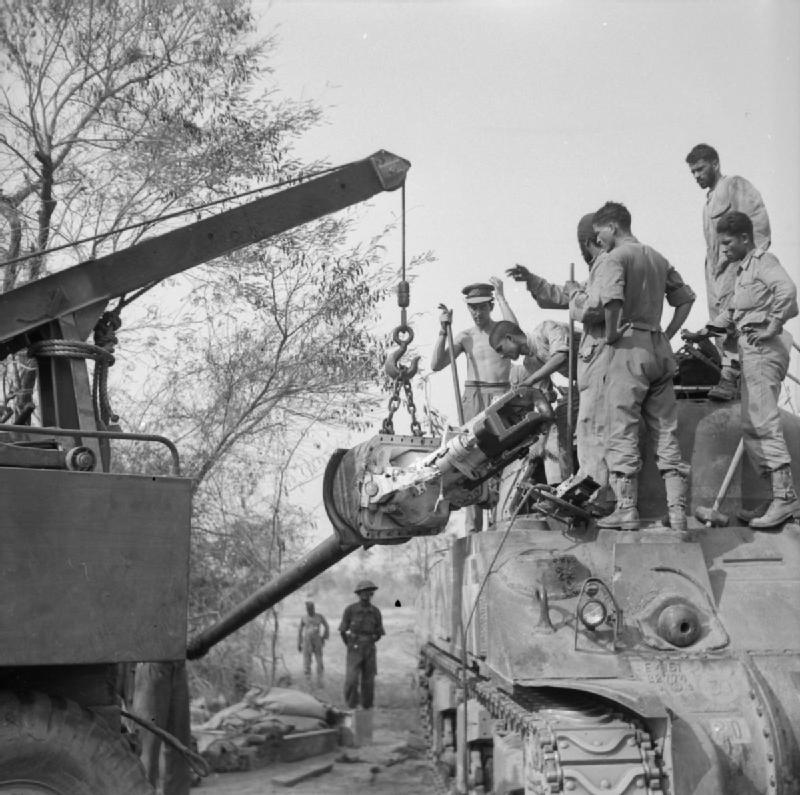
An M3 is lifted out of a Sherman tank at 5th Indian Division's tank workshop near Taungtha, Burma, 29 March 1945

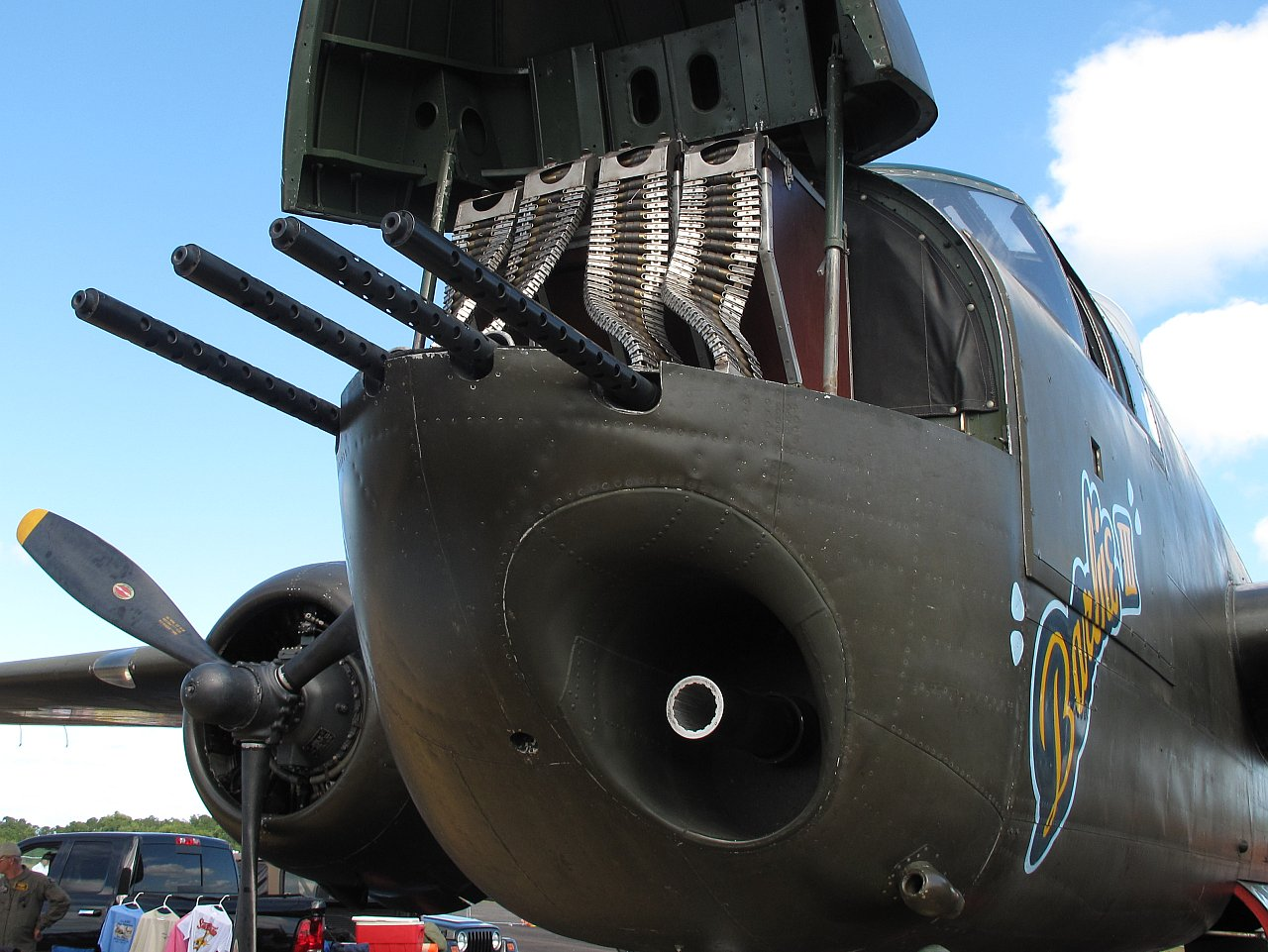
A restored Mitchell aircraft showing a 75 mm M5 gun below the four machine guns

The 75 mm gun, models M2 to M6, was the standard American medium caliber gun fitted to mobile platforms during World War II. They were primarily mounted on tanks, such as the M3 Lee and M4 Sherman, but one variant was also used as an air-to-ground gun on the B-25 Mitchell medium bomber aircraft. There were five main variants used during the war: M2, M3, M4, M5 and M6.

They were considered the standard American tank guns. The M2 and M3 were used on the M3 medium tank, the M3 was used on the M4 Sherman tank, and the M6 was used on the M24 Chaffee light tank. The M3 was also used on M7 medium tank.

The M5 variant was fitted on some North American B-25 Mitchell medium bomber aircraft.

== History ==
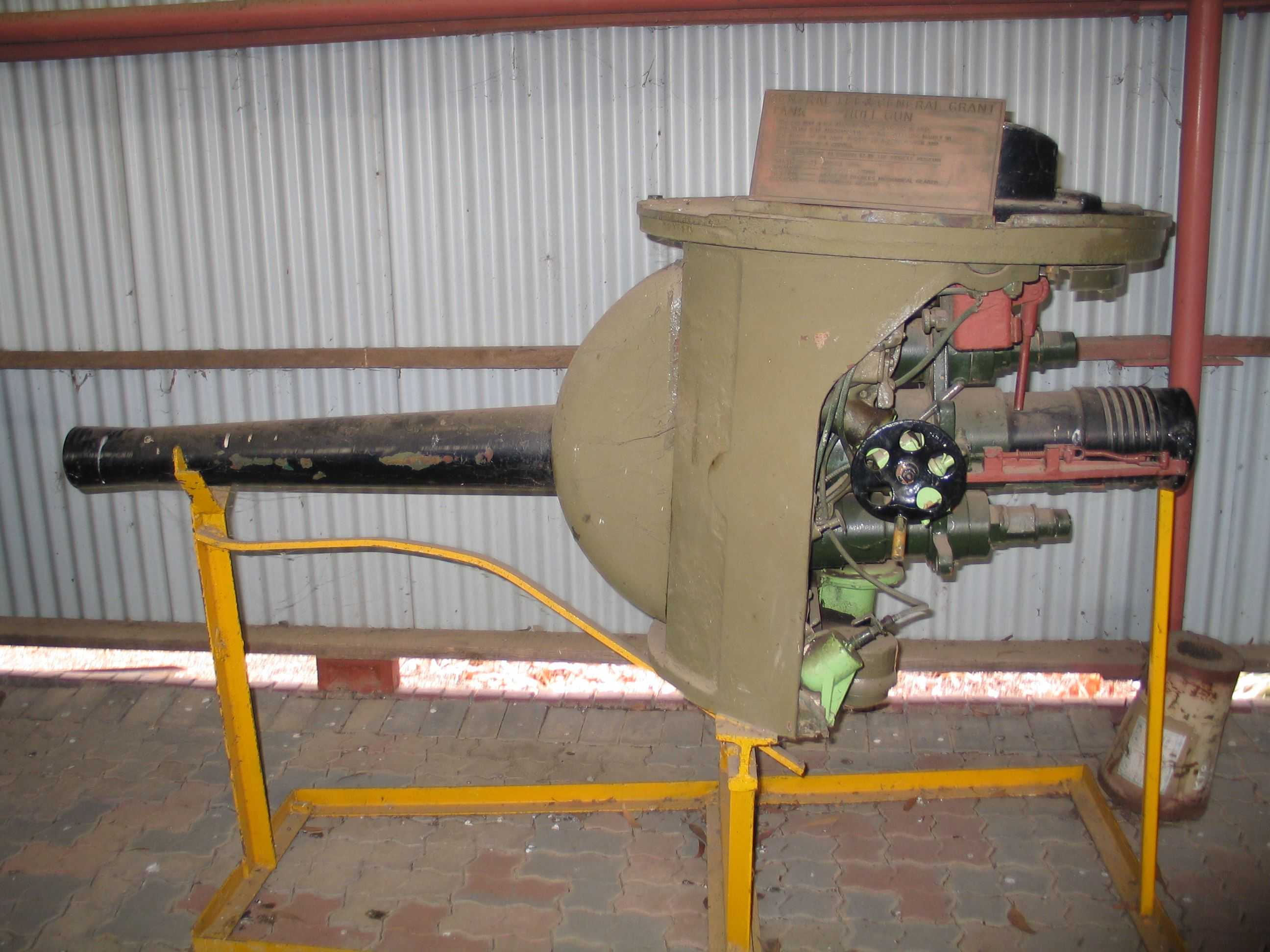
M2 75 mm gun as mounted in medium tank M3

The 75 mm tank gun has its origins in the January 1937 specification for a light anti-aircraft gun T6 which would have supplemented heavy 3-inch guns and used the same range of 75x350R ammunition as the 75 mm field gun M1897. After the gun, which featured a 31-caliber barrel and a sliding block breech, failed the trials, it was reused in mid-1940 to develop the T7 tank gun.

British tanks in the early years of World War II relied on high-velocity ordnance derived from anti-tank guns, such as the 40 mm calibre Ordnance QF 2 pounder and, later, 57 mm calibre Ordnance QF 6 pounder, for their primary armament. According to the Royal Armoured Corps doctrine, they were not supposed to fire HE shells, which turned out to be a great disadvantage. Post-war, the UK's Tank Museum credited the US 75mm gun as "America's most important contribution to tank warfare" because of its ability to combine good (for the time) AP and HE performance. They believed that the American observers working with the British before Dunkirk had appreciated the effectiveness of such a dual purpose weapon, and so it was made a prime requirement for US tank production.

After experiencing the effectiveness of the American 75 mm tank guns in the infantry support role, the British opted to adopt the American caliber and ammunition by the expedient of boring-out the 6 pounder tank gun to make the Ordnance QF 75 mm. By 1944, this had become the standard British tank gun, equipping the Cromwell tank and Churchill tank for the campaigns in northwest Europe.

== Ammunition ==
The primary round was the 6.76 kg (14.9 lb) M48 high explosive round, which travelled at 594 m/s (1950 ft/s) using the supercharge from the longer barreled M3 and contained 1.5 pounds (680 g) of TNT filling (2845 kilojoules of explosive energy) and a choice of two fuzes, the super quick (SQ) and the delay (PD), which had delays of 0.05 and 0.15 seconds respectively. SQ was the standard setting, with PD used against structures, gun positions or lightly protected vehicles. The field gun origins of the ordnance and ammunition ensured that the M2/3/6 series HE round was highly effective for its caliber. The M48 was available in two versions, standard and supercharge, which had an increased propellent charge for greater muzzle velocity (1,885 ft/s (575 m/s) vs. 1,470 ft/s (450 m/s)) and range (2,300 yards greater) using the M2 gun. The M3 gun with a longer barrel had an muzzle velocity of 594m/s (1950 ft/s) Vs 463m/s (1520ft/s)

Other rounds fired by the 75mm tank guns included the T30 canister shot for use against troops in the open at short range. This, which was essentially a giant shotgun shell full of large numbers of steel balls, was used primarily in the Pacific. There was also the M89 base-ejecting hexachloroethane (HC) smoke round and the M64 white phosphorus (WP or "Willy Pete") round, which proved highly effective in the bocage fighting around Normandy. Finally, there were two different armor-piercing rounds.

The first armor-piercing round was the 6.32 kg (13.9 lb) M72 AP-T, a plain uncapped armor-piercing round whose performance dropped off as range increased due to poor aerodynamics. The M72 was replaced by the 6.63 kg (14.62 lb) M61 armor-piercing ballistic capped high explosive with tracer (APCBC-HE-T) shell. The blunt armor-piercing cap, made of a softer metal, helped to prevent shell shatter at higher velocities and against sloped and face-hardened armor. The aerodynamic ballistic cap acted as a windscreen and improved ballistic performance, maintained velocity, and hence increased penetration at longer ranges. Once the projectile had penetrated the target, a small explosive charge contained in a cavity at the base of the shell would detonate, shattering the shell and increasing damage inside the enemy vehicle. The tracer helped in the aiming of a second shot. In practice, the majority of M61 rounds were shipped without the explosive filler.

The M61A1 used an improved method of attaching the ballistic cap to the shell. The M61 had a muzzle velocity of 617 m/s (2024.28 ft/s) and was able to penetrate 81 millimetres (3.2 in) of rolled homogeneous armor plate at 0° from vertical at 500 yards range, and the 50 mm front plating of the Panzer III and IV Ausf. F2 current in early 1942 at 1,500 m. However, in March 1942, the Germans introduced the Ausf. G version of the Panzer IV, armed with the KwK 40 gun, and with frontal hull armour of 80 mm. This was somewhat compensated by the M4 Sherman's improved armor over the earlier M3 Lee making up for the 75mm M3's diminishing battlefield dominance; the German weapons testing agency Wa Pruef 1 estimated that the M4's standard 56º-angled glacis was impenetrable to the KwK 40 from 100 m when standing at a 30-degree side angle, while the 75 mm M3 could penetrate the Ausf G's hull in the same situation.

== Variants ==
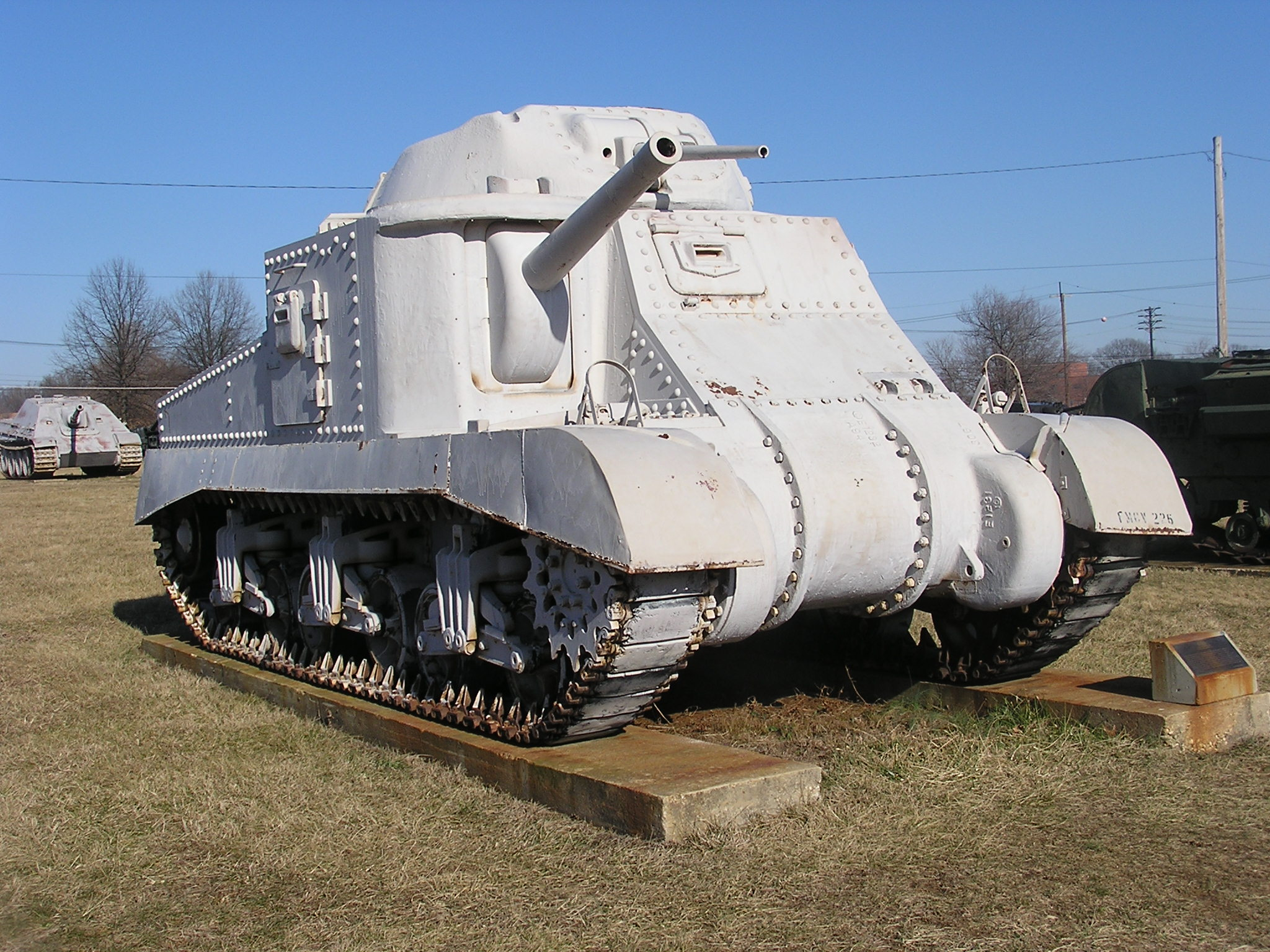
An M3 Grant with a 75 mm gun

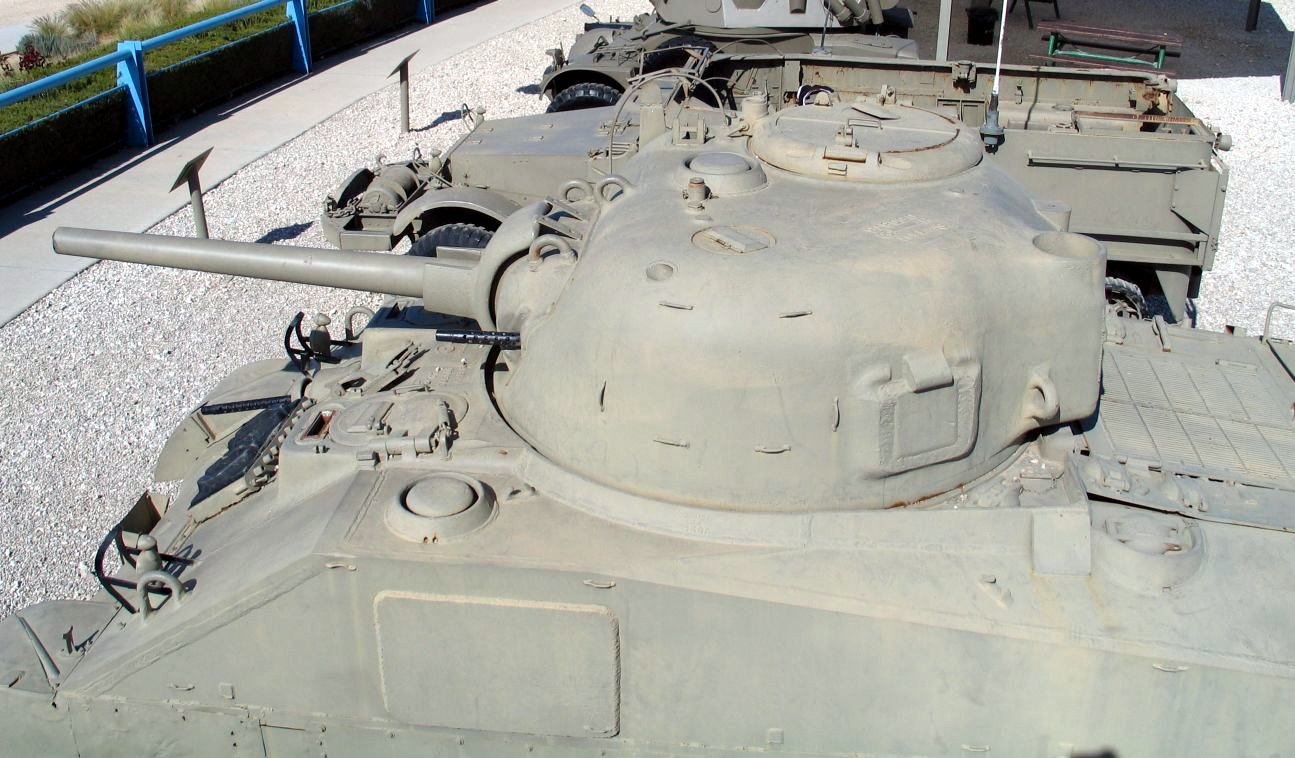
An M4 Sherman with a 75 mm gun M3

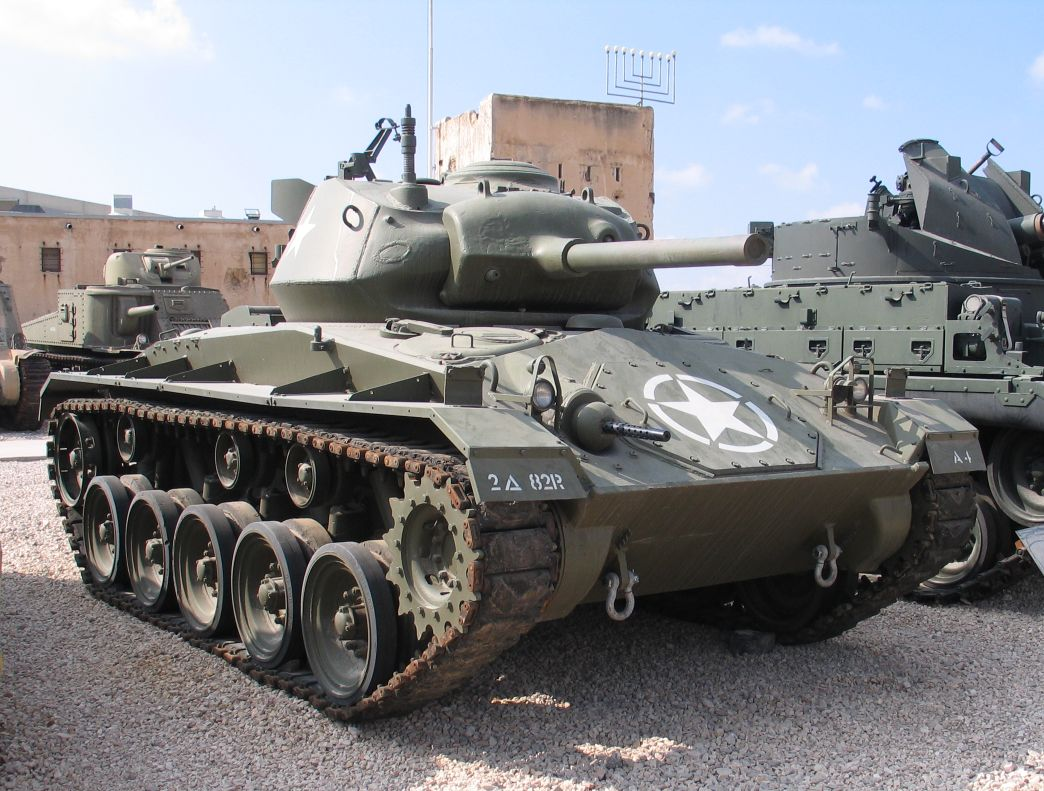
An M24 Chaffee with a 75 mm gun M6

T6

Experimental anti-aircraft gun based on the M1897 field gun. The barrel was shortened from 36 to 31 calibers, and the Nordenfelt screw breech replaced with the sliding block breech.

T7 / M2

Adaptation of the T6 for tank gun role. Used on the early M3 Lee.

- Barrel length: 31 calibers
- Muzzle velocity: 588 m/s (1,929 ft/s) with M72 AP shell
- Maximum Rate of Fire (ROF): 20 rounds per minute

T8 / M3

Longer derivative of the M2. Equipped American and British vehicles such as the M4 Sherman, the later models of the M3 Lee and the Churchill III/IV NA75 (scavenged from Sherman tanks in the North African theatre). The US Army also experimented with mounting the M3 on various wheeled carriages for use as anti-tank gun, but the program was cancelled due to a lack of requirement.

- Barrel length: 40 calibers (3 m)
- Muzzle velocity: 619 m/s (2,031 ft/s) with M72 AP shell
- Maximum Rate of Fire (ROF): 20 rounds per minute

M4

The 75 mm aircraft gun M4 is a modification of the M3 gun found in medium tanks. It differs from the M3 gun, only in having a seat for the spline machined in the tube. It was mounted on the M6 mount.

T13E1 / M5

A lightweight version of the M3 with a lighter thin-walled barrel and a different recoil mechanism of the concentric hydrospring type (similar to the modern M256 smoothbore gun) that was used in the Douglas A-26 Invader and the North American B-25H Mitchell bombers. It uses the same ammunition and has the same ballistics as the M3.

M6

A version derived from the T13E1 for the M24 Chaffee.

- Barrel length: 39 calibres (2,92 m)
- Muzzle velocity: 619 m/s (2,031 ft/s) with M72 AP shell
- Maximum Rate of Fire (ROF): 20 rounds per minute

== Penetration comparison ==
Penetration of armor in mm at 30 degrees from vertical
Gun type	Ammunition	Target	500 yards	1,000 yards	1,500 yards	2,000 yards
75mm L/31 (M2)	APC M61	RHA	60	55	51	46
75mm L/31 (M2)	AP M72	RHA	60	53	46	38
75mm L/31 (M2)	APC M61	FHA	69	60	55	48
75mm L/31 (M2)	AP M72	FHA	58	46	33	25
75mm L/40 (M3/M6)	APC M61	RHA	66	60	55	50
75mm L/40 (M3/M6)	AP M72	RHA	76	63	51	43
75mm L/40 (M3/M6)	HVAP T45	RHA	117	97	79	64
75mm L/40 (M3/M6)	APC M61	FHA	74	67	60	54
75mm L/40 (M3/M6)	AP M72	FHA	66	53	41	33

Estimated penetration figures (90 degrees)
Gun type	Ammunition	Target	Muzzle velocity	Penetration (mm)										
Gun type	Ammunition	Target	Muzzle velocity	100 m	250 m	500 m	750 m	1000 m	1250 m	1500 m	1750 m	2000 m	2500 m	3000 m
75mm L/31 (M2)	APC M61	FHA	563 m/s (1,850 ft/s)	92	89	84	79	75	71	67	63	59	53	47
75mm L/31 (M2)	APC M61	RHA	563 m/s (1,850 ft/s)	78	76	72	68	65	61	58	55	52	47	42
75mm L/31 (M2)	AP M72	FHA	563 m/s (1,850 ft/s)	82	76	67	59	52	45	40	35	31	24	19
75mm L/31 (M2)	AP M72	RHA	563 m/s (1,850 ft/s)	95	90	81	73	66	60	54	49	45	36	30
75mm L/40 (M3/M6)	APC M61	FHA	618 m/s (2,030 ft/s)	102	99	95	90	86	82	79	75	72	65	60
75mm L/40 (M3/M6)	APC M61	RHA	618 m/s (2,030 ft/s)	88	85	81	77	73	69	65	62	59	53	47
75mm L/40 (M3/M6)	AP M72	FHA	618 m/s (2,030 ft/s)	91	85	75	66	58	51	45	40	35	27	21
75mm L/40 (M3/M6)	AP M72	RHA	618 m/s (2,030 ft/s)	109	102	92	84	76	68	62	56	51	41	34

== See also ==
- List of U.S. Army weapons by supply catalog designation
- List of artillery

=== Weapons of comparable role, performance and era ===
- Ordnance QF 75 mm – Contemporary British tank gun
- 7.5 cm KwK 40 – Contemporary German tank gun
- F-34 tank gun – Contemporary Soviet tank gun

== Sources ==
- Zaloga, Steven J., Brian Delf – US Anti-tank Artillery 1941–45 (2005) Osprey Publishing (New Vanguard 107), ISBN 1-84176-690-9.
- Hunnicutt, R P (1978). Sherman, A History of the American Medium Tank. Presidio Press. ISBN 1626548617.
- TM 9-2800 Standard Artillery and Fire Control Material (dated February 1944)
