= M7 Priest =

American self-propelled artillery vehicle

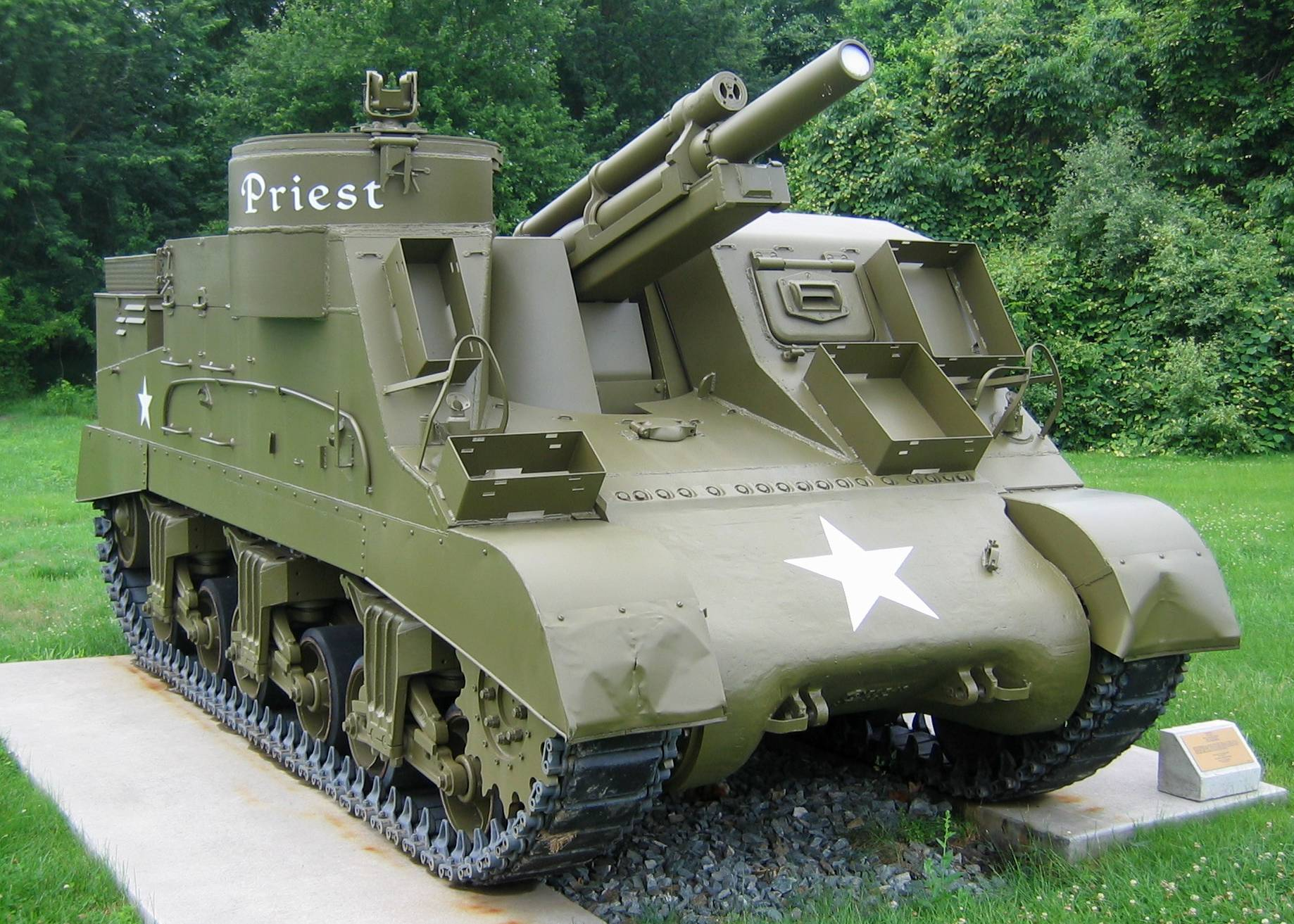
- M7 preserved at Aberdeen Proving Ground, Maryland
- Type: Self-propelled gun
- Place of origin: United States

Service history
- Used by: United States Army; Argentine Army; Austrian Army; Belgian Army; British Army; Canadian Army; French Army; Israel Defense Forces; Italian Army; Norwegian army Pakistan Army; Philippine Army; Philippine Constabulary; Republic of China Armed Forces; Bundeswehr (West German Army); Yugoslav People's Army
- Wars: World War II; Korean War

Production history
- Manufacturer: American Locomotive Company (M7); Pressed Steel Car (M7B1); Federal Machine and Welder (M7)
- Produced: April 1942 – July 1945
- No. built: M7: 3489, M7B1: 826; M7B2: 127 converted from M7B1
- Variants: M7, M7B1, M7B2

Specifications
- Mass: 50,640 lb (22.97 metric tons)
- Length: 19 ft 9 in (6.02 m)
- Width: 9 ft 5 in (2.87 m) with sandshields
- Height: 8 ft 4 in (2.54 m); 9 ft 8 in (2.95 m) over AA machine gun
- Crew: 8
- Armor: 12–62 mm
- Main armament: 105 mm M1/M2 howitzer 69 rounds
- Secondary armament: 1 × 0.5 in (12.7 mm) M2 Browning machine gun 300 rounds
- Engine: Continental R-975 C1/C4; Ford GAA (M7B1); 400 or 340 hp (298 or 254 kW)
- Suspension: Vertical volute spring
- Operational range: 120 mi (193 km)
- Maximum speed: 24 mph (39 km/h) on road 15 mph (24 km/h) off-road

The 105 mm howitzer motor carriage M7 was an American self-propelled artillery vehicle produced during World War II. It was given the service name 105 mm self propelled, Priest by the British Army, due to the pulpit-like machine gun ring, and following on from the Bishop and the contemporary Deacon self-propelled guns. Canada would also produce a similar vehicle in significant numbers named the Sexton.

== Design and development ==
During the early stages of World War II, US Army observers realized that they would need a self-propelled artillery vehicle with sufficient firepower to support armored operations. Lessons learned with half-tracks (such as the T19 howitzer motor carriage (HMC) with a 105 mm howitzer on the M3 half-track chassis) also showed that this vehicle would have to be armored and fully tracked. It was decided to use the M3 Lee chassis as the basis for this new vehicle design, named T32. The pilot vehicles used the M3 chassis with an open-topped superstructure, mounting an M2A1 105 mm howitzer, with a machine-gun added after trials.

The T32 was accepted for service as the M7 in February 1942 and production began that April. The British Tank Mission had requested 2,500 to be delivered by the end of 1942 and a further 3,000 by the end of 1943, an order which was never fully completed.

As the M4 Sherman tank replaced the M3, it was decided to continue production using the M4 chassis (the M4 chassis was a development of the M3). The M7 was subsequently supplanted by the M37 105 mm howitzer motor carriage (on the "light combat team" chassis that also gave the M24 Chaffee light tank).

== Operational history ==
A total of 3,489 M7s and 826 M7B1s were built. They proved to be reliable weapons, continuing to see front-line service in the US and other armies well past the end of World War II.

=== North Africa ===
During the North African campaign, 90 M7s were received by the British Eighth Army in North Africa, which was also the first to use it, during the Second Battle of El Alamein, alongside the Bishop, a self-propelled gun based on the 87.6 mm calibre Ordnance QF 25-pounder gun-howitzer.

The British Commonwealth armies had logistical problems in supplying the M7, as it used US ammunition that was not compatible with standard British artillery pieces or tank guns, and had to be supplied separately. Whereas the Sexton – a rival self-propelled gun developed in Canada - featured the standard British QF 25-pounder (on an M3 or M4 chassis).

Despite supply problems, British Commonwealth forces used the M7 throughout the campaigns in North Africa and Italy.

=== Northwest Europe ===
During the invasion of Normandy, from June 1944, the artillery regiments of the British 3rd and 50th divisions, and the Canadian 3rd Division were equipped with the M7; however, these were replaced by towed 25-pounder guns in early August.

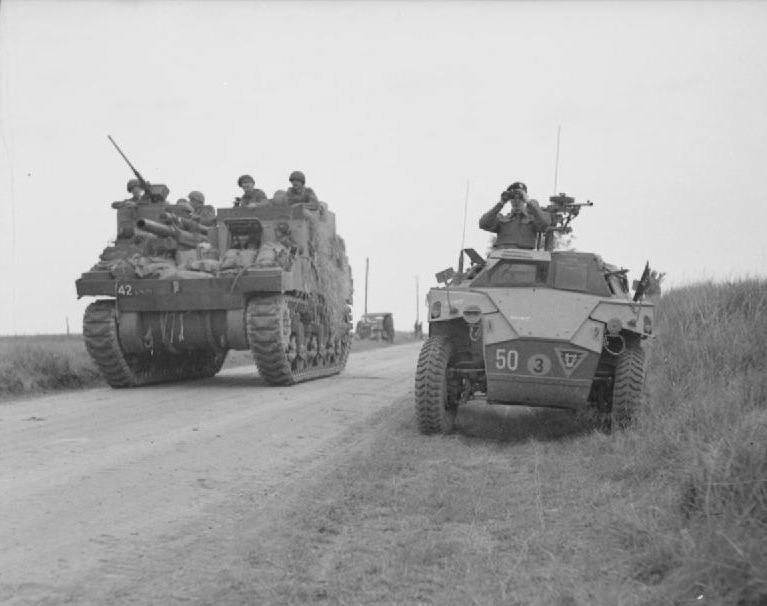
M7 Priest passes by a Humber scout car as it moves into position to support an attack on Caen, 8 July 1944.

During the Battle of the Bulge, each US armored division had three battalions of M7s, giving them unparalleled mobile artillery support.

=== Pacific War ===
The M7 was also used by US and British forces in Pacific and Asian theaters.

During the Burma campaign, the Priest played a significant role, in particular, at the Battle of Meiktila and the advance on Rangoon (1945).

From early 1944 it was used in the South West Pacific theater, by the US Sixth Army in the later stages of the campaign in New Guinea and surrounding islands. The M7 also saw action in the Philippines campaign, with the US Eighth and Sixth armies.

=== After World War II ===
Korean War
M7 Priests remained in use during the Korean War, where their flexibility, compared to towed artillery units, led the US Army on the path to converting fully to self-propelled howitzers. The limited gun elevation of the M7 (35 degrees) hampered its ability to shoot over the tall Korean mountains, so 127 M7B1s were modified to permit the full 65 degrees elevation in a model known as the M7B2. After the Korean War, many of these were exported to NATO countries, notably Italy and Germany.

Israel
Israel acquired a number of M7 Priests during the 1960s and employed them in the Six-Day War, the War of Attrition and the Yom Kippur War where three M7 units, the 822nd, 827th and 829th Battalions in the IDF Northern Command, supported operations in the Golan Heights.

West Germany
The new West German Bundeswehr received 127 Priests as its first self-propelled artillery vehicle. They entered service in 1956 and were used until the early 1960s.

== Surviving vehicles ==
=== Australia ===
- Australian Armour and Artillery Museum, in Cairns, in a World War II US Army paint scheme.

=== Austria ===
- An M7 which was used in the Austrian Bundesheer (Army) after World War II is in the private Robert Gill Collection in Austria.

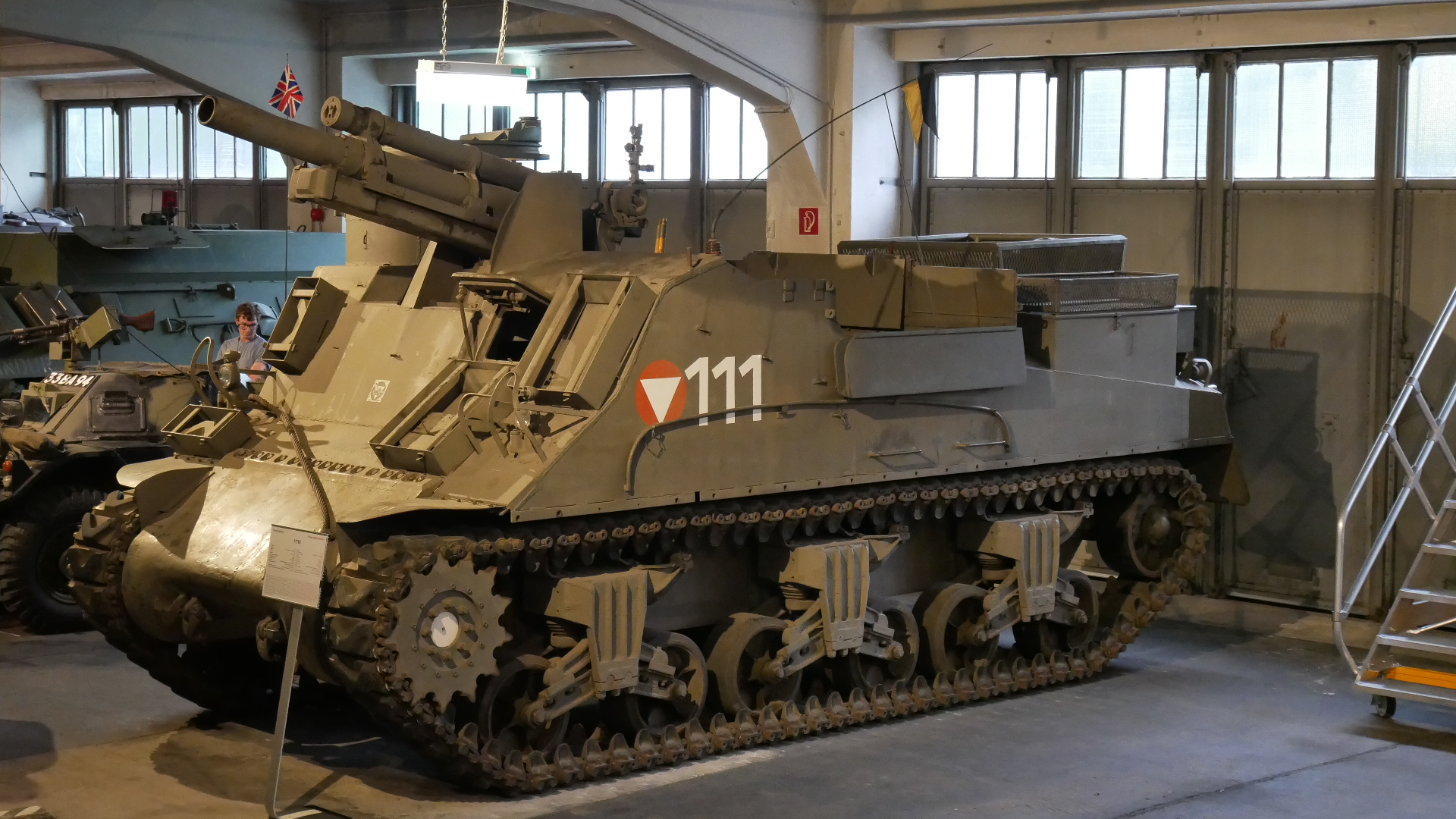
Austrian Bundesheer M7 Priest at the Heeresgeschichtliches Museum in Vienna, Austria.

=== Belgium ===
- M7 at the Tank Museum Brussels (Belgium)

=== Canada ===
- The Canadian Tank Museum, in Oshawa, Ontario, M7B1.

=== Germany ===
- Deutsches Panzermuseum Munster (German Tank Museum, Munster).
- Generalfeldmarschall-Rommel-Kaserne, Augustdorf Germany
- Major-Radloff-Kaserne, Weiden Germany

=== Israel ===
- Unrestored hulk in kibbutz Kineret, Israel.

=== Philippines ===
- M7 in Philippine Expeditionary Forces to Korea markings and colors which took part in the Battle of Yultong is on permanent static display at the Philippine Military Academy Baguio City, Benguet.

=== United States ===
- A M7 and M7B1 at The American Military Museum, South El Monte, California
- Vermont National Guard Library and Museum, Colchester, Vermont
- General George Patton Museum of Leadership, Fort Knox, Kentucky
- National Guard armory, Starkville, Mississippi.
- A M7B1 and an M7B2 at the Texas Military Forces Museum in Camp Mabry, Austin, Texas.
- A M7 by the main entrance outside the barracks of West Virginia Army National Guard base Camp Dawson in Kingwood, West Virginia.
- Displayed outdoors at the Third Infantry Division Museum at Fort Stewart, GA.
- Display outdoors at National Guard Armory, Savannah, Georgia
- One M7 on outdoor display at the American Legion Post #382 in Sanford, NC
- One M7 on permanent static display at Camp Guernsey in Guernsey, Wyoming.
- One M7B2 on display at the American Heritage Museum in Stow, Massachusetts
- One M7 on outdoor display at Fort Missoula in Missoula, Montana.
- One M7 on outdoor display at the Museum of the Kansas National Guard in Topeka, Kansas.
- One M7 on outdoor display at the Yuma Proving Ground Outdoor Museum near Yuma, Arizona

== Variants ==
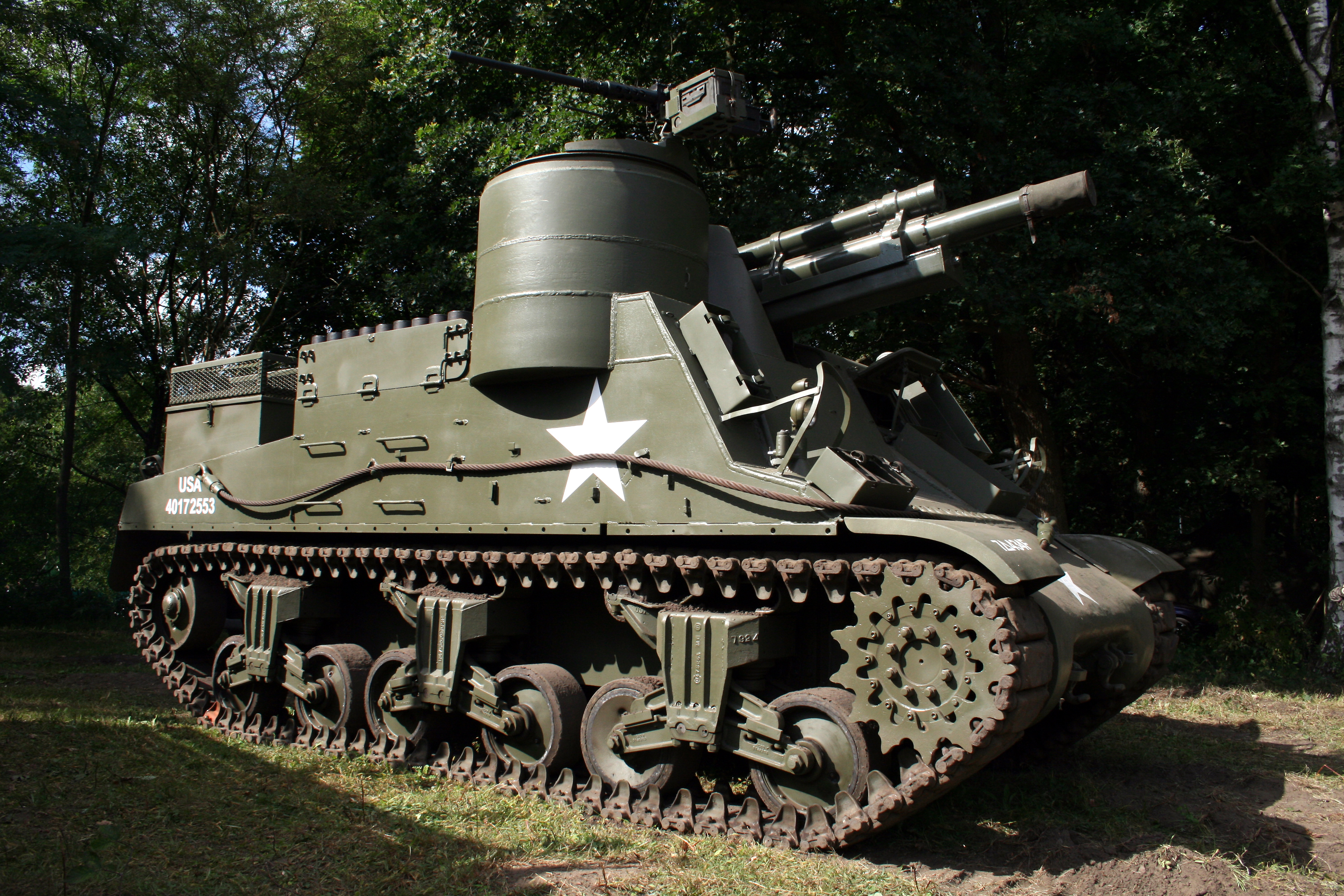
M7 at the Tank Museum Brussels (Belgium)

M7
The first M7s produced were based on modified M3 Lee medium tank chassis. To maintain a low silhouette, the howitzer elevation had to be restricted to 35°. In May 1942, after only a month of production, the vehicle was altered to increase its ammunition stowage from 57 to 69 rounds. This was achieved by placing seven rounds on the left wall and five on the right. The M7 also went through a fairly rapid shift from being based on the M3, to having more commonality with the M4 Sherman. The first major example was an adoption of the M4's three-piece housing, single-piece casting and suspension. In British service, some M7s carried a radio set, which took the place of 24 rounds of ammunition.
M7B1
Completing the shift, the M7B1 was fully based on the M4A3 Sherman chassis. 826 M7B1 were produced from March 1944 to February 1945.
M7B2
During the Korean War, the limited elevation of the howitzer became noticeably problematic. 127 M7B1 were modified to permit an elevation of 65° to increase the effective range of the howitzer. The machine gun mount also had to be raised to give a 360° firing arc.

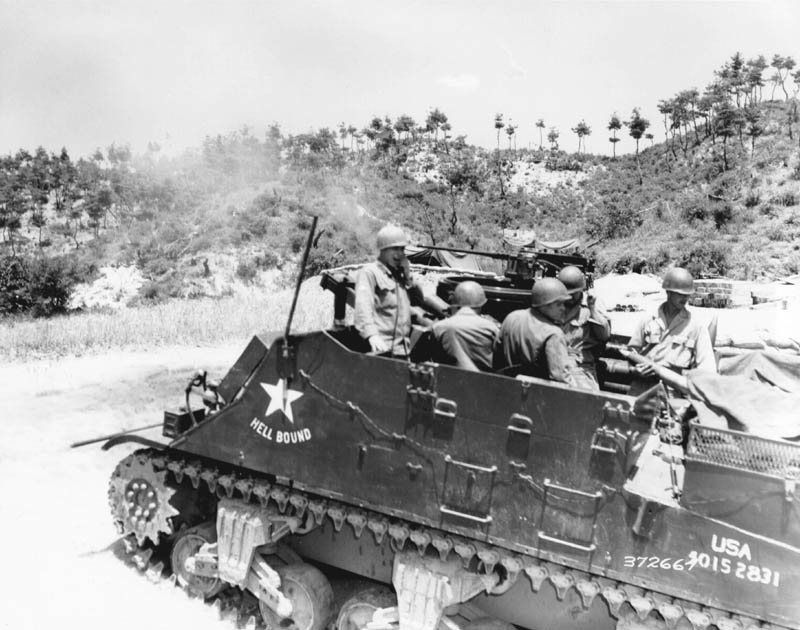
Howitzer motor carriage M7 in Korea (1951)

"Defrocked Priest"
As one part of the Allied effort to capture Falaise and break out from the Normandy beachhead, 72 M7s had their main guns removed in the field for service as armoured personnel carriers and were first used in Operation Totalize. These field modified vehicles were referred to as "Defrocked Priests", "Unfrocked Priests" or as "Holy Rollers". The work was done in one week by 250 personnel from 14 British and Canadian Royal Electrical and Mechanical Engineer units. 36 vehicles each were allocated to the 4th Infantry Brigade of the 2nd Canadian Division and the 154th (Highland) Brigade of the 51st (Highland) Division, which led the attack.
Kangaroo
A Canadian armored personnel carrier conversion of the M7 for use by British and Commonwealth units in northern Europe. The Kangaroo could carry 20 infantry plus a crew of two. A total of 102 were converted between October 1944 and April 1945. The name "Kangaroo" became generic for all conversions of armored fighting vehicles into personnel carriers, including Ram tank conversions.
25pdr howitzer motor carriage T51
M7 fitted with 25 pounder gun in July 1942.

== British SPG naming scheme ==
A British self-propelled gun armed with the Ordnance QF 25-pounder in design from 1941 was nicknamed Bishop as its appearance was said to resemble a bishop's mitre and a replacement, the US 105 mm howitzer motor carriage M7, was called "Priest", as part of its superstructure was said to resemble a pulpit. Following this line of names, a 1942 self-propelled gun armed with the QF 6 pounder was named Deacon and a 1943 weapon carrier with the QF 25-pounder was called Sexton.

== In popular culture ==
An altered M37 Priest was used to represent a German Tiger tank in the "Hold That Tiger" episode of the TV series Hogan's Heroes (season 1, episode 2, first broadcast September 24, 1965).

== See also ==
- G-numbers (SNL G128)
- List of "M" series military vehicles
- M108 howitzer
