= BWP-2000 =

- Type: Infantry Fighting Vehicle
- Place of origin: Poland

Service history
- Used by: none
- Wars: none

Production history
- Designed: Early 1990s - 1999
- Produced: Before 1997
- No. built: 2

Specifications (BWP-2000)
- Mass: 30 tonnes
- Crew: 3 (+8 passengers)
- Main armament: 60mm Oto Melara autocannon
- Secondary armament: 7.62mm coaxial machine gun (PKT, MG3A1 or UKM-2000); 12.7mm NSW or WKM-B anti-aircraft heavy machine gun 2x BGM-71D TOW-2 anti-tank missiles
- Engine: V-46-6 12-cylinder diesel 780 hp (582 kW)
- Power/weight: 26 hp/tonne (19.4 kW/t)
- Suspension: torsion bar
- Operational range: 500 km
- Maximum speed: 70 km/h

BWP-2000 (BWP stands for Bojowy Wóz Piechoty - Infantry Fighting Vehicle) is a prototype Polish IFV developed from early 1990s to 1999 but eventually canceled.

== Development ==
The origin of the Polish BWP-2000 is the MT-S( МТ-С ) tracked transporter developed jointly by Poland, Soviet Union and East Germany in late 1980s. That vehicle was mainly developed by the Soviet OKB-40 design bureau in Mytischi and by the Polish OBRUM (Ośrodek Badawczo-Rozwojowy Urządzeń Mechnicznych - Institute of Research and Development of Mechanical Devices) from Gliwice. The OBRUM developed the BWP-2000 with help from Polish experts on IFVs. Poland is gradually replacing the former Soviet designs with Western-type systems. Two prototypes were made and in 1997 one of them was fitted with a fully developed and tested Italian Oto Melara T60/70A turret. This turret was developed as a private venture by Oto Melara and as of mid-2005 it has remained in prototype stage. By mid-2005, there were no plans for the Polish BWP-2000 IFV to enter production for the Polish Army. The main priority of the Polish Army is the introduction of the KTO Rosomak. If the BWP-2000 ever enters production it is going to be produced by Bumar łabędy.

In December 2009 Polish Minister of Defence Bogdan Klich announced that BWP-1M "Puma" modernization program has been canceled due to both tested OWS not standing up to the requirements. Currently Polish Land Forces are considering a new multipurpose platform UPG-NG ("Universalne Podwozie Gąsienicowe-Nowej Generacji" which stands for "Universal Tracked Chassis-of New Generation") as the replacement for the aging BMP-1 fleet as well as the basis for new light/medium tank with 120 mm unmanned turret and autoloader. The platform is currently under development by OBRUM and could be put into full-scale production by 2015. Its potential competitor is a licensed build CV90 offered by BUMAR Group.

== Description ==
The BWP-2000 has a typical IFV layout. The steering compartment with the driver's station is located on the left hand side of the front of the hull. The engine compartment is located on the right hand side of the front of the hull. The fighting compartment is located along with the turret in middle of the hull. The troop compartment is located in back. The vehicle has a three men crew consisting of a driver, a gunner and a commander. The vehicle uses a number of chassis components from the MT-S transporter. The chassis was called Kalina. The hull made entirely out of welded steel. It protects the vehicle against APFSDS-T projectiles of up to 35 mm in calibre over the frontal arc. The roof and sides protect it against 12.7 mm rounds fired from a range of 100 m. The other parts of the armour protect it against 7.62 mm rounds from any distance and angle. Both the hull and the turret can be fitted with additional passive of explosive reactive armour. The driver has a single-piece hatch cover that lifts and opens to the right (like in the BWP-1). In front of the driver's hatch is located a wide-angle periscope which can be replaced by a passive night vision device for use during night conditions. The power pack an air inlet/outlet louvres in the roof and the exhaust outlet on the right hand side. The turret is the Italian Oto Melara T60/70A which is normally armed with a stabilized 60 mm rifled autocannon, a 7.62 mm coaxial machine gun and 12.7 mm anti-aircraft heavy machine gun. Inside the turret are the stations of both the gunner and the commander. The 60 mm autocannon can be replaced by a variety of guns from 25 mm autocannons to 105 mm guns. The turret is equipped with two clusters of four electrically operated smoke grenade launchers on each side. The troop compartment can transport up to eight fully equipped soldiers. Like in the BWP-1 the troops enter and leave the vehicle through the rear of the vehicle but in BWP-2000 they do this via a power-operated ramp. The engine comes from the T-72.
