= M7 medium tank =

American prototype tank of World War Two

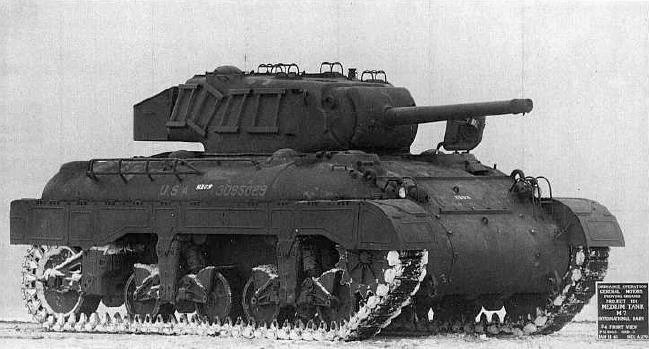
- Third production M7 medium tank at the General Motors Proving Ground.
- Type: Medium tank
- Place of origin: United States

Production history
- Manufacturer: International Harvester Corp.
- Produced: 1942
- No. built: 13 + prototypes

Specifications
- Mass: 53,950 lb (24,470 kg)
- Length: 17 ft 2 in (5.23 m)
- Width: 9 ft 4 in (2.84 m)
- Height: 7 ft 9 in (2.36 m)
- Crew: 5 (Commander, loader, gunner, driver, co-driver)
- Armor: 13–64 mm (0.51–2.52 in)
- Main armament: 75 mm M3 in M47 mount 71 rounds
- Secondary armament: 3 × .30-06 M1919A4 Browning machine gun 4,500 rounds
- Engine: Continental R975-C1; 9-cylinder radial gasoline 350 hp (260 kW)
- Suspension: Vertical volute spring suspension
- Maximum speed: 30 mph (48 km/h) on road

The M7 medium tank, initially T7 light tank, was an American tank, originally conceived as an up-gunned replacement for the M3/M5 light tank ("Stuart"). The project developed to mount the same 75mm armament as the M4 Sherman while retaining the light weight and maneuverability of the M3 Stuart; however, during development the weight of the prototype surpassed the US Army's standard for light tanks and crossed into the medium tank category and was renamed. The M7 had significantly less armor than the M4 Sherman, no greater firepower, and held only a slight advantage in top speed. For these reasons, and because the M4 was already battle-tested and in full production, the M7 was cancelled in 1943.

== Development ==
In January 1941, the Armored Force prepared a list of characteristics for a new light tank weighing 14 short tons (13 t) armed with a 37mm gun protected by up to 38 mm (1.5 in) of armor and with a "low silhouette" which was passed to Ordnance Department with building of two pilot vehicles carried out by Rock Island Arsenal. For comparison purposes the first (T7) was to be of welded hull and cast turret with VVSS suspension, the second (T7E1) of rivetted hull, composite cast and welded turret and HVSS. Riveted construction was recognized as obsolete and the vehicle was never completed but used to test the transmission and suspension.

Three further vehicles (T7E2 to T7E4) with different engine and transmission combinations were ordered during development. A change of armament to include the 57mm gun T2 and, at the request of Armored Force, the 75mm M3 followed. Increasing the length of the hull increased the weight but increasing the armor protection to 63 mm (2.5 in) maximum took the weight to 25 short tons (23 t).

A more apt classification was thus given by OCM 18522, dated 6 August 1942, which standardized the T7E5 as the M7 medium. An order for 3,000 M7s to start in November 1942 was placed with International Harvester.

== Testing ==
Test revealed that the produced vehicles were heavier than anticipated at 28 to 29 short tons (25 to 26 t) fully stowed. This reduced performance and production was halted until it could be rectified. Analysis of the problem indicated that it was caused by castings being thicker than specified. Six of the production tanks were then modified to use the lightest castings possible and their power trains were revised to improve performance. The modified vehicles were referred to as M7E2s in some documents. Testing of the modified vehicles revealed improved performance but only at lower speeds and that the performance was considered inferior to the M4A3 medium tank. The six modified vehicles and the remaining seven were accepted as M7 mediums bringing the total run to 13 tanks. Thus production acceptance records show only a total of seven tanks.

A proposal to re-engine with a Ford V-8, as the M7E1, was initiated but cancelled in July 1943 and the M7 was declared obsolete at the end of 1943.

At least one M7 medium tank survives to this day. It is kept at the U.S. Army Center for Military History Storage Facility in Anniston, Alabama. It was formerly part of the collection at the Aberdeen Proving Ground Museum. It is listed in the collection as "Tank, Light, Experimental, US Army, Steel, Olive Drab, M7, 75mm, US".

== Variants ==
T7
Welded hull, cast turret, five speed Hydramatic transmission, vertical volute spring suspension
T7E1
Riveted hull, formed homogenous plate turret, Continental R torque converter. Not completed but used for transmission and suspension trials
T7E2
Cast upper hull modified during construction with turret ring from Canadian Ram tank to take 57mm T2 gun, Wright R-975 Engine, Warner Gear torque converter. Completed in June 1942 with Ordnance QF 6-pounder Mark III.
T7E3
Welded hull and turret, twin Hercules DRXBS diesel engines, Detroit Gear automatic transmission
T7E4
Welded hull and turret, twin Cadillac engines, two Hydra-Matic transmissions
T7E5
T7E2 modified to take 75 mm M3. Standardized as M7 medium. Seven built
M7E2
Modification of the M7 design to use the lightest possible castings. Power train revisions, torque converter modifications, final drive gear ratio changed from 2.5:1 to 2.685:1, 13 tooth sprocket replaced the 14 tooth sprocket. Six built
