= M37 105 mm howitzer motor carriage =

Korean War-era US self-propelled gun

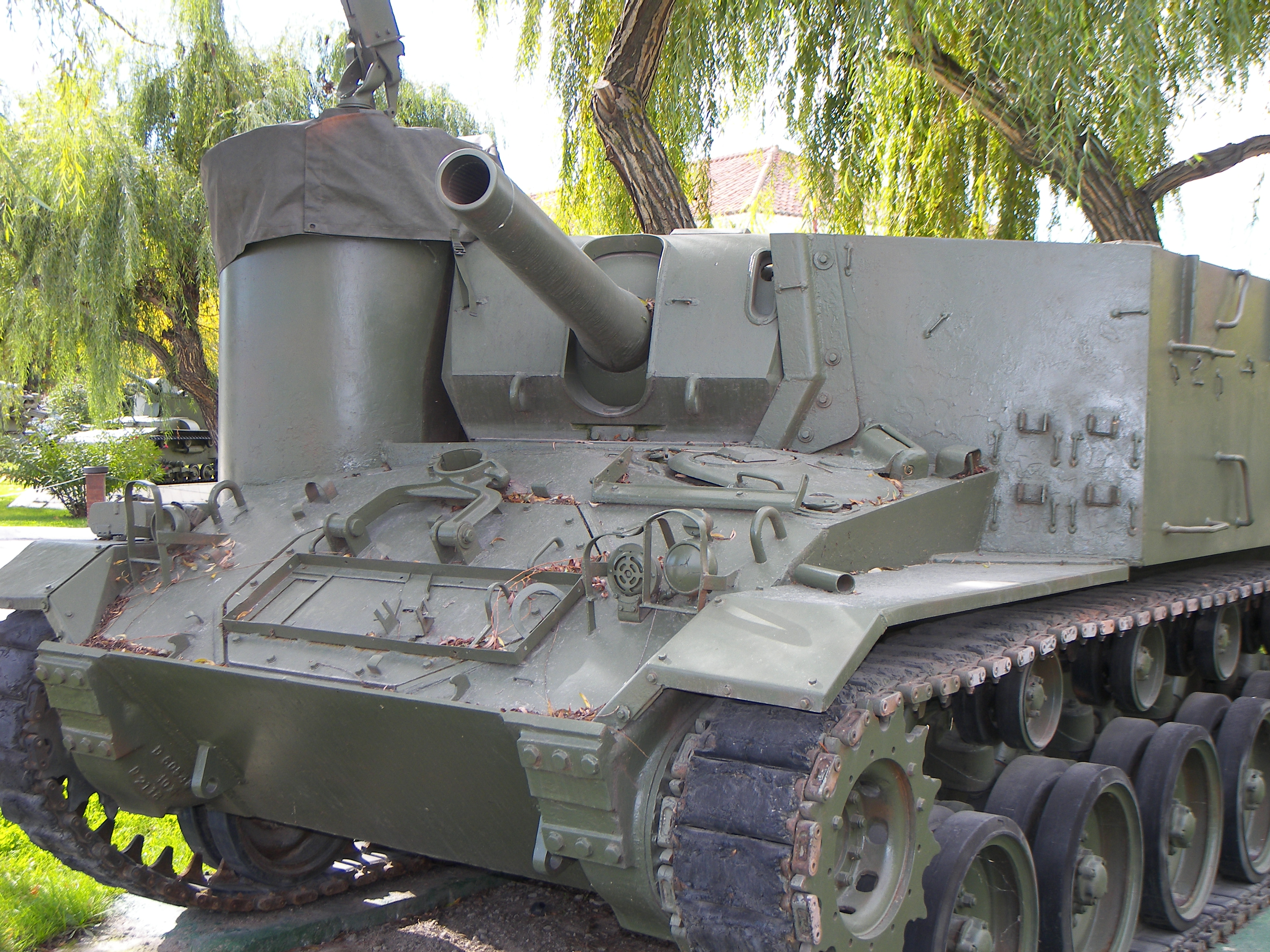
- A Spanish Army M37, El Goloso armour museum, Madrid, Spain
- Type: Self-propelled artillery
- Place of origin: United States

Service history
- In service: 1950–1953 (U.S Army)
- Used by: United States; Spain
- Wars: Korean War

Production history
- Manufacturer: Cadillac
- Produced: January 1945–1953
- No. built: 316

Specifications
- Mass: 46,000 lb (20.87 metric tons)
- Length: 5.49 m (18 ft 0 in) including rear storage
- Width: 3 m (9 ft 10 in)
- Height: 2.77 m (9 ft 1 in)
- Crew: 7
- Elevation: 42.8 to -10.5 degrees
- Traverse: 25.4° left and 26.3° right; manual
- Effective firing range: Conventional
- Feed system: hand
- Armor: 12.7 mm (0.50 in)
- Main armament: 105 mm Howitzer M4 in Mount M5; 126 rounds
- Secondary armament: .50 cal (12.7 mm) Browning M2HB machine gun in ring mount T107; 990 rounds
- Engine: Twin Cadillac Series 44T24; 220 hp (164 kW) at 3,400 rpm (per engine)
- Power/weight: 12 hp (8.9484 kW) / tonne
- Transmission: Hydramatic; 8 speeds forward, 4 reverse
- Suspension: Torsion bar
- Fuel capacity: 110 US gallons (420 litres)
- Operational range: 100 mi (160 km)
- Maximum speed: 30-35 mph (48-56 km/h) max road speed

The M37 105 mm howitzer motor carriage is a 105 mm howitzer self propelled gun developed by the United States. It saw combat in the Korean War and remained part of the U.S. military until being replaced in the late 1950s. Approximately 316 were built.

== Development and production history ==
The M37 105 mm howitzer motor carriage (named T76 105 mm HMC during development starting in 8 July 1943) was developed by the US on an extended M24 Chaffee base, and was intended to be the successor to the 105 mm M7 Priest. It used the same 105 mm Howitzer M4 as the ones mounted on some M4 Sherman medium tanks. The M37 HMC was an open topped vehicle using torsion bar suspension with tracks 16 in (41cm) wide. Though the gun performance was similar to that of the M7 Priest, the use of the lighter chassis from the M24 Chaffee made the self-propelled gun easier to handle.

== Service history ==
Standardized for production in January 1945 with all units being built by the Cadillac Division of General Motors, the M37 was built too late to see action in World War II. However, it would see action with US forces as an artillery piece during the Korean War. Out of the 448 units ordered, 316 M37 HMCs were built, at least 150 post war. The M37's thin armor (0.5 in or 1.27 cm) could provide protection from small arms fire and artillery splash, but nothing greater. Its "pulpit" machine gun, like that of the M7 Priest, could be used for anti-aircraft purposes, and its 105 mm Howitzer M4 was able to turn a total of 51.7 degrees. Though its basis, the M24 Chaffee, was fast, the M37 was much more sluggish due to the amount of ammunition it carried (126 rounds), its recoil system, and the weight of the 105 mm howitzer M4.

After the war, some units would see service in foreign countries, such as in the Spanish Army. Both the M37 as well as the M7 would be replaced in the late 1950s by the M52 HMC, a self-propelled gun built on the M41 light tank.
