= Deacon (disambiguation) =

A deacon is an official in Christian churches.

Deacon, the Deacon or Deacons may also refer to:

== People ==
=== Name ===
- Deacon (surname), a list of people
- Deacon (given name), a list of people with the given name

=== Nickname or stage name ===
- William Brodie (1741–1788), Scottish master woodworker and city councillor, who burgled from his elite clientele and inspired The Strange Case of Dr Jekyll and Mr Hyde
- Irving Crane (1913–2001), American pool player nicknamed "the Deacon"
- Deacon Donahue (1920–2008), American Major League Baseball relief pitcher
- Harold "Deacon" Duvall (1917–2014), American college and high school football coach
- Steve Hunter (born 1948), American guitarist nicknamed "the Deacon"
- Deacon Jones (1938–2013), professional football player and actor
- Deacon Jones (infielder) (born 1934), American baseball infielder
- Deacon Jones (pitcher) (1892–1952), American baseball pitcher
- Deacon Jones (runner) (1934–2007), American Olympic steeplechase runner
- Melvyn "Deacon" Jones (1943–2017), American blues organist
- Deacon Litz (1897–1967), American racing driver
- Deacon Maccubbin (born 1943), American LGBTQ rights activist
- Deacon McGuire (1863–1936), American Major League Baseball catcher, manager and coach
- Deacon Meyers (1899–1978), American baseball pitcher in the Negro leagues
- Deacon John Moore (born 1941), American blues, rhythm and blues, and rock and roll musician, singer, and bandleader
- Deacon Phelps (1867–1951), Canadian politician, lawyer and businessman
- Deacon Phillippe (1872–1952), American Major League Baseball pitcher
- Deacon Turner (1955–2011), American National Football League player
- Frank Waite (1905–1989), Canadian ice hockey player
- Deacon White (1847–1939), American baseball catcher
- William "Deacon" White (1878–1939), American educator, athlete, coach, manager, owner and promoter of multiple sports
- Deacon the Villain, stage name of American hip hop artist and producer Willis Garnett Polk II (born 1979)

=== Epithet ===
- List of people known as the Deacon

== Fictional characters ==
- Deacon (comics), a Marvel comic book villain and foe of Ghost Rider
- Deacon Claybourne, on the TV series Nashville
- Deacon Frost, a Marvel Comics vampire
- Deacon Palmer, on the TV series The King of Queens
- Deacon Sharpe, on the soap operas The Bold and The Beautiful and The Young and the Restless
- Deacon St. John, protagonist of the video game Days Gone
- The Deacon (The Wire), on the TV series The Wire
- The Deacon, main antagonist in the movie Waterworld

== Title ==
- Deacon, Scots usage for the leader of a trade guild
- Deacon, an officer in a Masonic Lodge

== Places ==
- Deacon, Indiana, United States, an unincorporated community
- Deacons, New Jersey, United States, an unincorporated community
- Deacon Hill (Antarctica), Coronation Island, South Orkney Islands
- Deacon Peak, Penguin Island, South Shetland Islands

== Other uses ==
- Deacon (album), second studio album by American singer-songwriter serpentwithfeet
- Deacon (artillery), a British armoured fighting vehicle of the Second World War
- Deacon (rocket), a sounding rocket
- Nike-Deacon, an American sounding rocket
- Deacons (law firm), which operates in Hong Kong and the People's Republic of China
- De Pere Deacons, a semi-professional hockey team in the Great Lakes Hockey League (adult) in 1977, based out of De Pere, Wisconsin

== See also ==
- Cardinal Deacon, the lowest-ranking of three orders in the College of Cardinals in the Roman Catholic Church
- Deacon process, a chemical process used in the manufacture of alkalies
- Deacon's School, a school from 1721 to 2007 in Dogsthorpe, Peterborough, England
- Wake Forest Demon Deacons, the athletic program of Wake Forest University
  - Demon Deacon, a costumed student who serves as Wake Forest's mascot
- Deakin (disambiguation)
- Deakon, a list of people with the given name or surname
