= Deacon John =

Deacon John may refer to:

- Deacon John Moore, New Orleans guitarist and bandleader
- Deacon John Buffington House, historic house in Swansea, Massachusetts
- Deacon John Moore House, historic house in Windsor, Connecticut
- Deacon John Symmes House, historic house in Winchester, Massachusetts
- Deacon John Troyer (1753–1842), religious figure in the Long Point, Ontario region
- John Adams Sr. (1691–1761), father of second US president, John Adams
- John Deacon, the bassist for the band Queen (credited as Deacon John on its debut album)

== See also ==
- Deacon Jones (disambiguation)
- John Deacon (disambiguation)
