= Archdeacon (disambiguation) =

Archdeacon (oculus episcopi) is an ecclesiastical below directly below bishop who may be assigned an archdeaconry in many Christian Churches.

Archdeacon may also refer to:

- The Archdeacon, an 1899 novel by Lucy Bethia Walford
- The Archdeacon, a minor character in the 1996 Disney film The Hunchback of Notre Dame

== Places ==
- Archdeacon Meadow, cricket ground in Gloucester, England, UK

== People ==
- Dan Archdeacon (1954–2015), American mathematician
- Ernest Archdeacon (1863–1950), French lawyer of Irish descent
- Mark Archdeacon (born 1989), Scottish football striker
- Maurice Archdeacon (1898–1954), American baseball center-fielder who played for the Chicago White Sox
- Owen Archdeacon (born 1966), Scottish football left-winger

== See also ==
- Deacon (disambiguation)
