= Deacon (artillery) =

British self-propelled gun

AEC Mk I Gun Carrier; "Carrier, 6-Pdr Gun, A.E.C., Mk I Deacon"
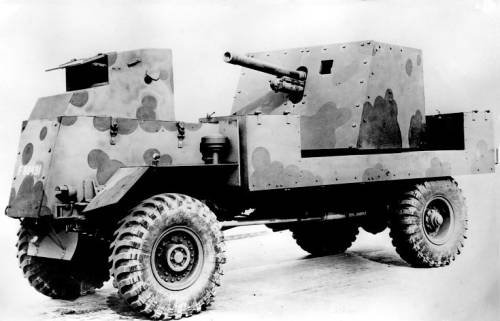
- Type: Self-propelled artillery
- Place of origin: United Kingdom

Service history
- In service: 1942–1943
- Used by: United Kingdom; Turkey
- Wars: Second World War

Production history
- Manufacturer: AEC/Park Royal Vehicles
- No. built: 175

Specifications
- Mass: 12 long tons (12 t; 13 short tons)
- Length: 21 ft (6.4 m)
- Width: 7 ft 9 in (2.36 m)
- Height: 9 ft 3 in (2.82 m)
- Crew: 5
- Armour: 6–20 mm (0.24–0.79 in)
- Main armament: QF 6 pounder (57 mm); 24 rounds
- Secondary armament: none
- Engine: AEC A173 7.7L 6-cyl diesel 95 hp (71 kW)
- Power/weight: 7.8 hp/tonne
- Drive: wheeled, 4×2, 4×4
- Transmission: 4 + reverse gears, with two-speed transfer box
- Suspension: leaf spring
- Ground clearance: 13 in (330 mm)
- Operational range: 174 mi (280 km)
- Maximum speed: 19 mph (31 km/h)

The AEC Mk I Gun Carrier, known as Deacon, was a British armoured fighting vehicle of the Second World War. It was an attempt to make the Ordnance QF 6 pounder anti-tank gun into a self-propelled artillery piece. It was employed only during the North African Campaign from 1942 to 1943.

== History ==
The Deacon was developed in 1942 to provide British Army units in North Africa with a mobile anti-tank weapon. It can be seen as a development of the practice of carrying smaller artillery pieces en portee (sitting on the back of trucks). This meant that the artillery could quickly move, albeit with some loss of traverse. The basis of the Deacon Gun Carrier was an AEC Matador truck chassis. A 6-pounder gun with enclosed armoured shield was mounted on the flat bed at the rear of the chassis. The gunner and loader operated the gun from behind the shield. The conventional cab was replaced with a boxy armoured construction that covered the engine and the driver's position. Production started in December 1942 and 175 were built.

== Combat service ==
The Deacon was used against German armoured vehicles in North Africa, an environment in which wheeled vehicles were as manoeuvrable as tanks. They are credited with action at El Hamma, where the 76th (Royal Welch Fusiliers) Anti-Tank Regiment, Royal Artillery, was the victor in a battle against a German force that included Panzer III tanks. Deacons were withdrawn at the end of the campaign in North Africa, as they were not considered suitable for use in Europe. Some were converted to armoured ammunition carriers and others were sold to Turkey in 1943.

== Service name ==
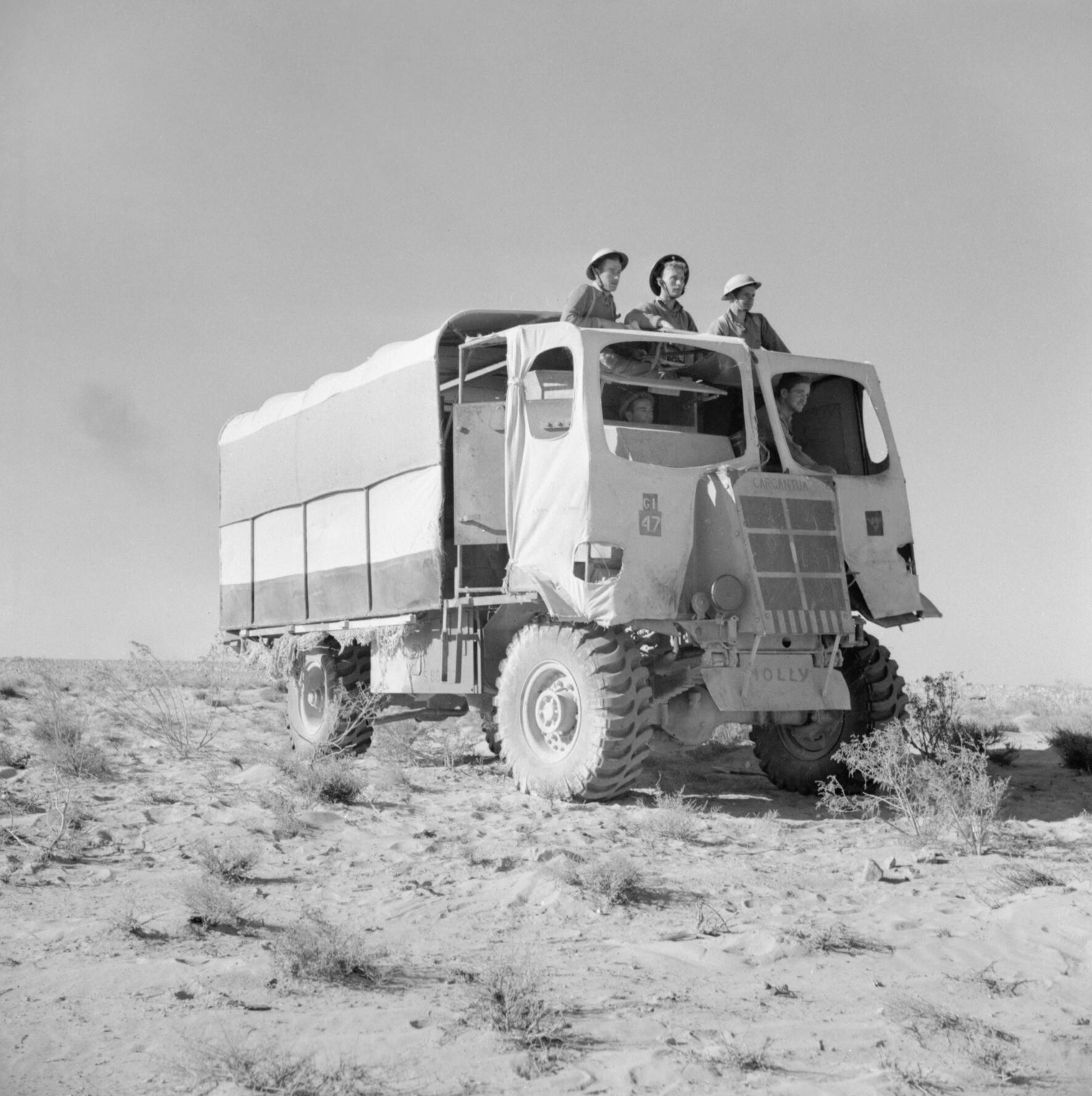
A Deacon disguised as a lorry, October 1942

Giving it the name Deacon was part of what became consistent naming of British self-propelled guns with ecclesiastical titles. A 1941 design with the Ordnance QF 25-pounder was nicknamed "Bishop", as its appearance was said to resemble a bishop's mitre. A replacement, the US 105 Millimeter Howitzer Motor Carriage M7, was given the service name "Priest" by the British, as part of its superstructure was said to resemble a priest's pulpit. A related design in 1943 with the QF 25-pounder was "Sexton". In more recent post-war years, the Royal Artillery used a self-propelled gun known as the "Abbot".

== Sources ==
- Moschanskiy, I. (1999). Бронетанковая техника Великобритании 1939–1945 часть 2 [Armored vehicles of the Great Britain 1939–1945]. Vol. 2. Modelist-Konstruktor, Bronekollektsiya 1999-02/Моделист-Конструктор, Бронеколлекция 1999-02.
- Haugh, D. R. (25 February 2008). "AEC Deacon Datasheet" (PDF) (revised ed.). Warwheels.net. Archived (PDF) from the original on 3 March 2016.
- Chamberlain, Peter; Milson, John (1975). Self-propelled anti-tank and anti-aircraft guns. WW2 Fact Files. New York: Arco.
