= Bishop (artillery) =

British self-propelled gun

Ordnance QF 25-pdr on Carrier Valentine 25-pdr Mk 1 "Bishop"
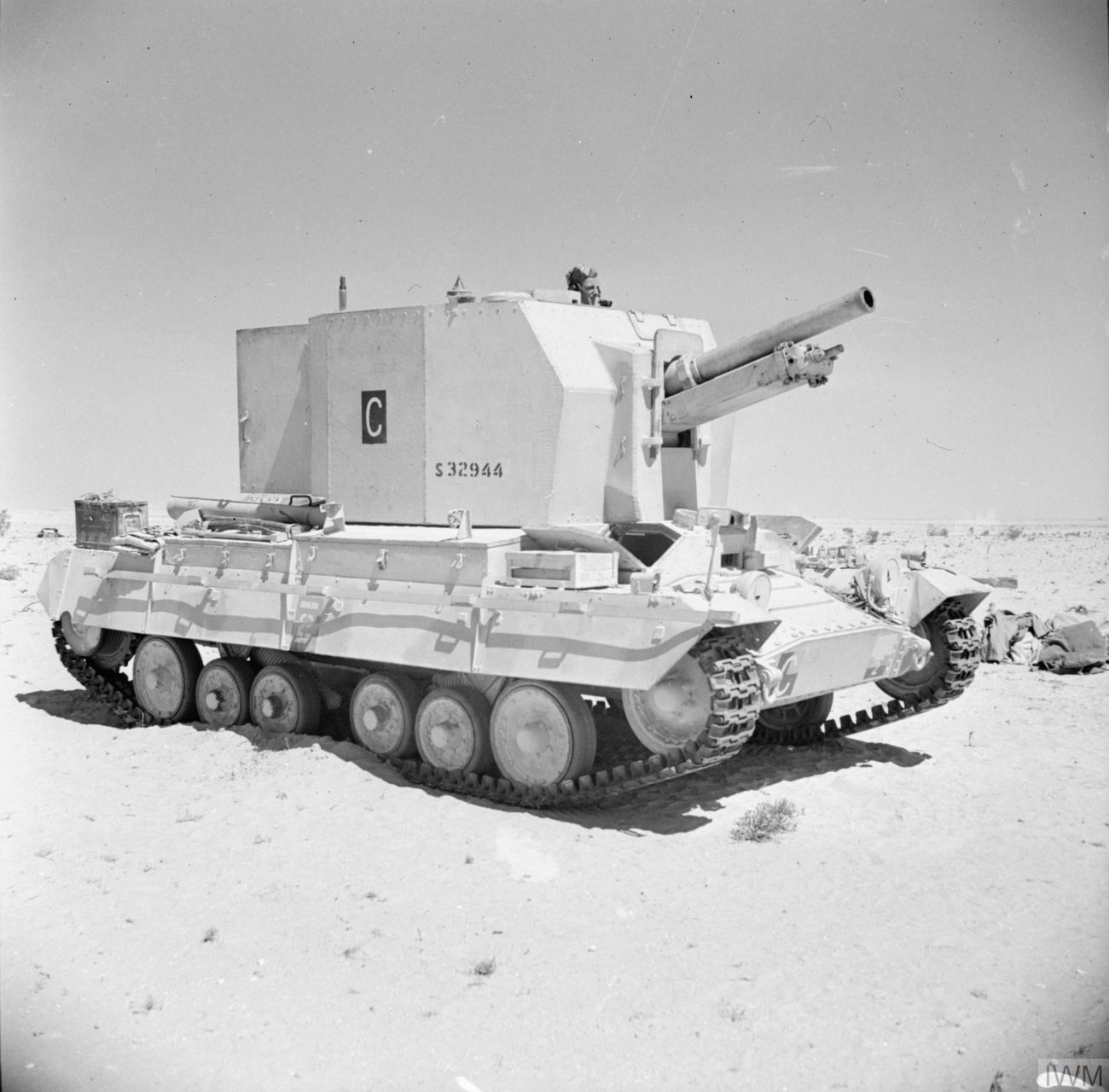
- Bishop in the Western Desert, September 1942
- Type: Self-propelled gun
- Place of origin: United Kingdom

Service history
- In service: 1942
- Used by: British Commonwealth; Turkey
- Wars: Second World War

Production history
- Designed: 1941
- Manufacturer: Birmingham Railway Carriage and Wagon Company
- Produced: 1942–1943
- No. built: 149

Specifications
- Mass: 17.5 t (38,580 lb)
- Length: 18 ft 6 in (5.64 m)
- Width: 9 ft 1 in (2.77 m)
- Height: 10 ft (3.0 m)
- Crew: 4 (Commander, gunner, loader, driver)
- Elevation: -5° to +15°
- Traverse: 8°
- Armour: hull: 0.31–2.36 in (8-60 mm) superstructure: 0.51–2 in (13–51 mm)
- Main armament: QF 25 pounder gun-howitzer with 32 rounds
- Secondary armament: 0.303 inch Bren light machine gun
- Engine: AEC A190 diesel 131 hp (98 kW)
- Power/weight: 7.4 hp/tonne
- Suspension: coil sprung three-wheel bogies
- Operational range: 90 mi (145 km)
- Maximum speed: 15 mph (24 km/h)

The Bishop, formal designation Ordnance QF 25-pdr on Carrier Valentine 25-pdr Mk 1, was a British self-propelled gun vehicle based on the Valentine tank and armed with the QF 25-pounder gun-howitzer, which could fire an 87.6 mm (3.45 in) 11.5 kg (25 lb) HE shell or an armour-piercing shell. A result of a rushed attempt to create a self-propelled gun, the vehicle had numerous problems, was produced in limited numbers and was soon replaced by better designs.

== Design and development ==
The rapid manoeuvre warfare practiced in the North African Campaign led to a requirement for a self-propelled artillery vehicle armed with the 25-pounder gun-howitzer. In June 1941, the development was entrusted to the Birmingham Railway Carriage and Wagon Company. A prototype was ready for trials by August and 100 were ordered by November 1941.

The vehicle was based on the Valentine II hull, with the turret replaced by a fixed boxy superstructure with large rear doors. It was nicknamed the Bishop for its high mitre-like superstructure.

The 25-pounder gun-howitzer was fitted in this superstructure. As a consequence of the gun mounting, the resulting vehicle had a very high silhouette, which is a disadvantage in desert warfare. The maximum elevation for the gun was limited to 15 degrees, reducing the range to 6,400 yards (5,900 m), about half that of the same gun on a wheeled carriage. To increase range, crews would build large earthen ramps and run the Bishop onto them, tilting the vehicle back to increase the elevation. The maximum depression was 5 degrees, traverse was 8 degrees, and the vehicle could also carry a Bren light machine gun. By July 1942, 80 Bishops had been built; as the last 20 were being built, an order for a further 50 was placed, with an option for a further 200 but the tender was abandoned in favour of the American 105 mm Howitzer Motor Carriage M7. Turkey received 48 Bishops in 1943.

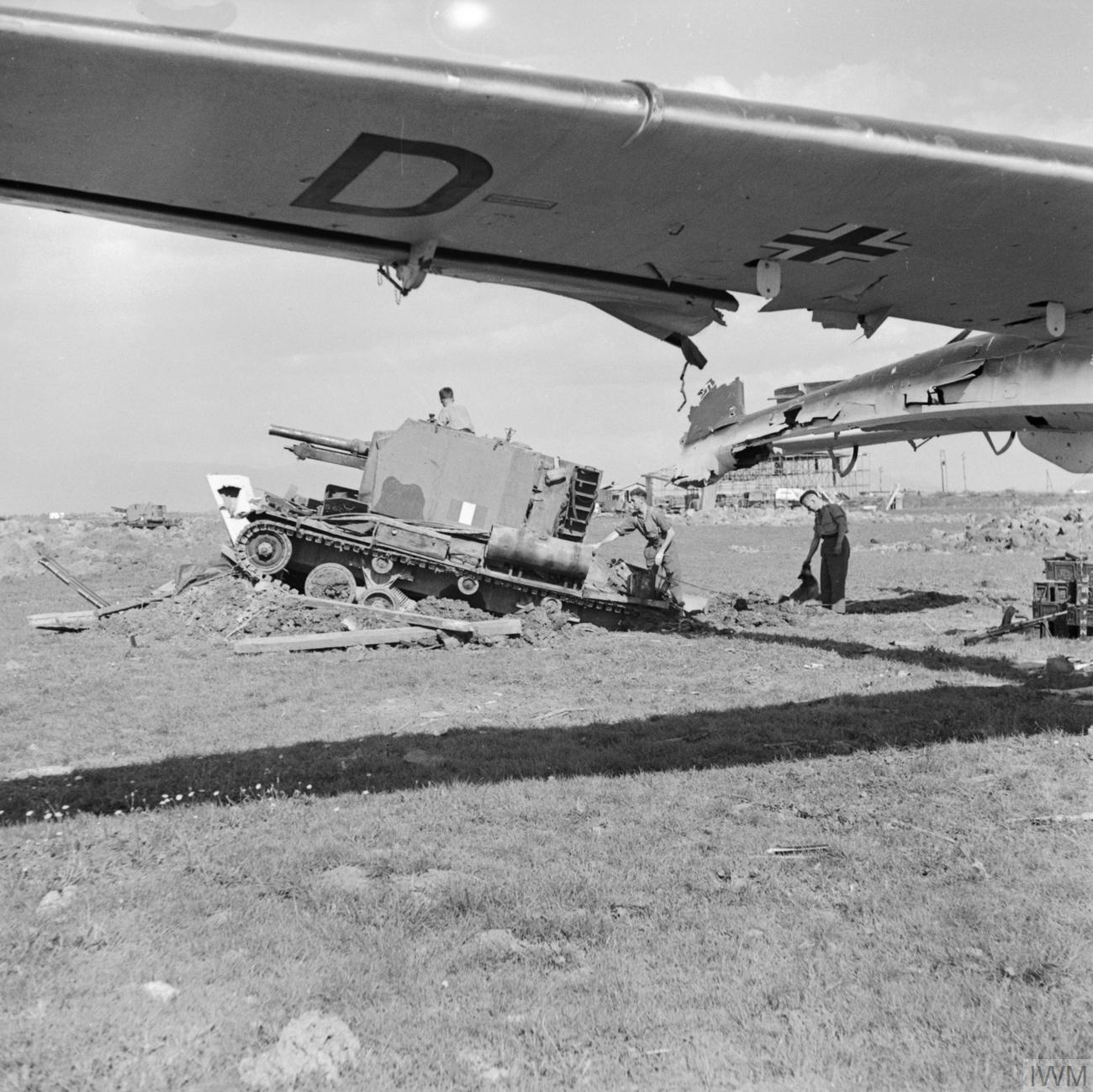
A Bishop deployed on an earth ramp at a former German airfield in Sicily, October 1943.

== Combat history ==
The Bishop first saw action during the Second Battle of El Alamein in North Africa and remained in service during the early part of the Italian Campaign. Due to its limitations and the Valentine's characteristic slow speed, the Bishop was poorly received. The Bishop was replaced by the M7 Priest (105 mm) and Sexton (25-pounder) when those became available in sufficient numbers and surviving Bishops were diverted for training in self-propelled gun tactics.

== British self-propelled guns with ecclesiastical names ==
The US 105 Millimeter Howitzer Motor Carriage M7 which replaced the Bishop, was given the service name "Priest" by the British, as part of its superstructure was said to resemble a priest's pulpit. Following this line of names, a 1942 self-propelled gun armed with the 57 mm QF 6 pounder anti-tank gun was the Deacon, and a 1943 vehicle with the QF 25-pounder on a chassis derived from the M3 Medium tank was the Sexton. This practice was continued after the war with FV433 Abbot and ended in 1993 when they were replaced with the AS-90.

== Sources ==
- Henry, Chris (2002). The 25-pounder Field Gun 1939-72. New Vanguard 48. illustrated by Mike Fuller. Osprey Publishing. ISBN 1-84176-350-0..
- Trewhitt, Philip (1999). Armored Fighting Vehicles. New York, N.Y.: Amber Books. p. 114. ISBN 0-7607-1260-3.
