= Deakon =

Deakon may refer to:

- Walter Deakon (1924–1982), Canadian politician
- Deakon James Lewis, Royal Australian Navy seaman honoured in the 2013 Australia Day Honours
- Deakon Patrick, an All-American on the North Carolina Tar Heels men's basketball team in 1964
- Deakon Tonelli, a tight end on the 2023-2026 Michigan Wolverines football teams

== See also ==
- Deacon (disambiguation)
- Deakin (disambiguation)
