= Deakin (surname) =

Deakin is a surname, and may refer to:

- Alan Deakin (1941–2018), English footballer
- Alex Deakin (born 1974), British weatherman
- Alfred Deakin (1856–1919), 2nd Prime Minister of Australia
- Arthur Deakin (1890–1955), British trade unionist
- Billy Deakin, football (soccer) player (Barnsley FC, Chester City)
- Edna Deakin (1871–1946), American architect
- Fred Deakin, British musician with Lemon Jelly
- John Deakin (1912–1972), English photographer
- John Deakin (footballer), English footballer
- John Deakin (rowing) (born 1965), British coxswain
- Johnny Deakin, Scottish footballer
- Joe Deakin (1879–1972), British runner
- Julia Deakin (born 1952), British actress
- Matt Deakin (born 1980), American competition rower
- Robert Deakin (1917–1985), Anglican Bishop of Tewkesbury from 1973-1985
- Robert Luke Deakin Australian Cyber Security Advisor,
- Roger Deakin (1943–2006), English writer, documentary-maker and environmentalist
- Val Deakin, New Zealand ballet dancer, choreographer and teacher
- William Deakin (1913–2005), British historian, also known as F. W. and F. W. D. Deakin

== See also ==
- Deakin (disambiguation)
- Deakins
