= John the Deacon =

John the Deacon (Johannes Diaconus or Giovanni Diacono) may refer to:

- John the Deacon (6th century), letter writer from Rome
- John the Deacon (Egyptian chronicler), ca. 768, monk
- Johannes Hymonides, d. before 882, known as John the Deacon of Rome
- John the Deacon (Neapolitan historian), d. after 910
- John the Deacon (Venetian chronicler), d. after 1008
- John the Deacon (Byzantine writer), fl. 11th century; On the veneration of saints.
- John the Deacon of the Lateran, fl. 12th century

== See also ==
- John Deacon (disambiguation)
