= List of people known as the Deacon =

"The Deacon" is a Christian epithet applied to:

- Arsenius the Great (died 445), Roman imperial tutor and saint who became an anchorite in Egypt
- Avakum the Deacon (1794–1814), Serbian Orthodox monk, martyr and saint
- Benjamin the Deacon and Martyr (329–c. 424), deacon martyred in Persia
- Bermudo I of Asturias (c. 750–797), King of Asturias
- Habib the Deacon (died 308? or 310?), Syriac Christian martyr
- James the Deacon (died after 671), Roman deacon and saint
- John the Deacon (disambiguation)
- Leo the Deacon (c. 950–?), Byzantine Greek historian and chronicler
- Nicanor the Deacon (died 76), martyr and one of the Seven Deacons
- Nicolas the Deacon, claimed by some of the early Christian Church Fathers to be the author of the heresy and sect of Nicolaism
- Paul the Deacon (c. 720s–796, 797, 798 or 799), Benedictine monk, scribe and historian of the Lombards
- Paulinus the Deacon (fl. 411–422), notary of Ambrose of Milan and his biographer
- Peter the Deacon (fl. 1115–1159), librarian of the abbey of Montecassino and continuator of the Chronicon monasterii Casinensis (Monte Cassino Chronicle)
- Vincent of Saragossa (died. c. 304), saint and martyr
