= Sexton (artillery) =

25pdr SP, tracked, Sexton
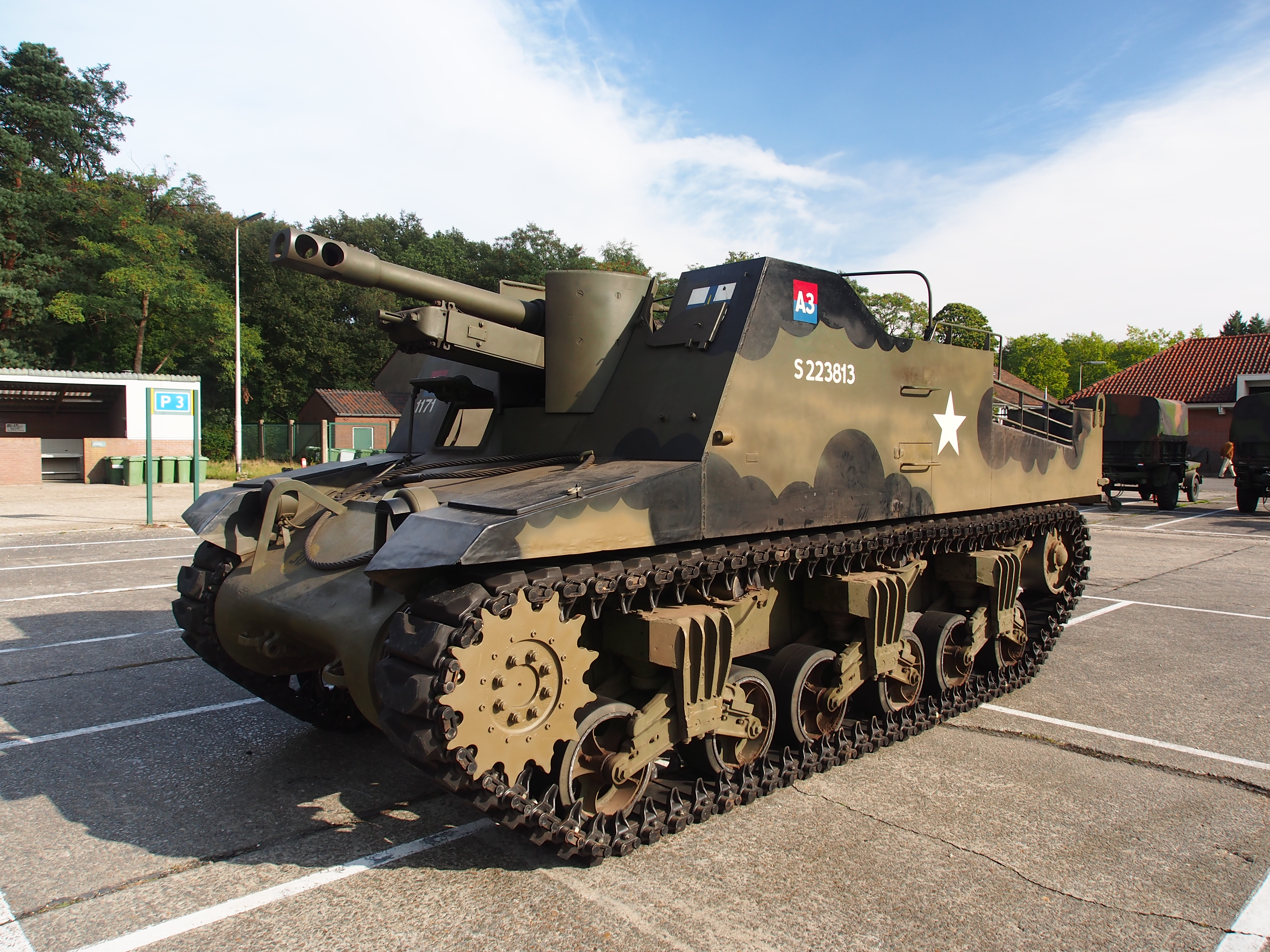
- A Sexton on display at the Dutch Cavalry Museum in 2013
- Type: Self-propelled artillery
- Place of origin: Canada

Service history
- In service: 1943–1956
- Used by: Canada; United Kingdom; South Africa; Poland; India; Portugal
- Wars: Second World War

Production history
- Designed: 1942
- Manufacturer: Montreal Locomotive Works
- Produced: 1943–1945
- No. built: 2,150
- Variants: Mark I, Mark II

Specifications
- Mass: 25 long tons (25 t))
- Length: 20 ft 1 in (6.12 m)
- Width: 8 ft 11 in (2.72 m))
- Height: 8 ft (2.4 m)
- Crew: 6 (Commander, driver, gunner, gun-Layer, loader, wireless operator)
- Elevation: +40° to -9°
- Traverse: 25° left 15° right
- Armour: 15–32 mm (0.59–1.26 in)
- Main armament: Ordnance QF 25-pounder (87.6 mm) Mk II; 105 rounds (mostly HE)
- Secondary armament: 2 × 0.303 (7.7 mm) Bren light machine guns AA; 50 × 30-round magazines
- Engine: Continental R-975 9-cylinder Radial gasoline 400 hp (300 kW)
- Suspension: Vertical volute spring
- Operational range: 125 miles+ (200 km)
- Maximum speed: 25 mph (40 km/h)

The 25pdr SP, tracked, Sexton (Note: also known as "Mounting, SP, 25-pdr, C, Mk I") was a Canadian-designed self-propelled artillery vehicle of the Second World War. It was based on Canadian-built derivatives of the American M3 Lee and M4 Sherman tank chassis. Canada had set up to produce the Ram tank using the M3 chassis and Grizzly (a copy of the M4) to complement US medium tank production; when Sherman production in the US expanded and supply was assured, it was decided in 1943 to switch the Canadian production lines to produce the Sexton to give the British Army a mobile gun using their 87.6 mm (3.45 in) Ordnance QF 25-pounder gun-howitzer for commonality with towed guns. The Sexton could fire either HE shell or an armour-piercing shell. It found use in the Canadian, British, and other British Commonwealth armies, as well as other countries. After the war, a number of Sextons and Grizzlies were sold to Portugal, which used them into the 1980s.

== History ==
In order to better provide artillery support in the highly mobile desert warfare of the North African Campaign, the British Army had quickly adapted the Valentine tank into a self-propelled 25-pounder gun: the Bishop. Introduced in 1942, the Bishop proved to have many problems in service. In particular, limited space meant that the turret had little elevation, requiring crews to use natural slopes, embankments or mounds to get the full range out of the gun.

As a stop-gap, the US-built M7 Priest, with an M101 105 mm howitzer, mounted on an M3 Lee chassis, was soon replacing the Bishop, reaching service in October 1942. In March 1942, the UK ordered 2,500 for 1942 with another 3,000 for 1943. The first M7s were rushed to Egypt for the Second Battle of El Alamein, where they played an important part. However, because the US 105 mm gun was not otherwise used by the British military, supplying ammunition to Priest crews was complicated and caused delays.

Simultaneously, two new self-propelled 25-pounder projects were being pursued by the British General Staff. Firstly, in the US, the 25-pounder Howitzer Motor Carriage T51 – a Priest adapted to mount the 25-pounder – was tested from July 1942. Development was delayed by issues including the destruction of the gun mount on the prototype, during the first live-firing trials.

Secondly, because US resources were increasingly devoted to equipping and upgrading the existing weaponry of US forces, the UK government inquired whether the Canadian government could facilitate rapid development and manufacturing of a self-propelled 25-pdr. The Canadian Department of Munitions and Supply asked the Canadian Army Engineering Design Branch to build such a vehicle.

A prototype was quickly built on the chassis of a Canadian Ram tank, which was also based on the M3 chassis. The Ram had been sidelined by a decision that Canadian armoured units should standardize around the Sherman and variants using the same chassis. The prototype was completed on 23 June 1942. Following trials in Canada, the Canadian government ordered 124 vehicles in three batches. The prototype was shipped to the United Kingdom in early 1943, where it underwent further trials. In May 1943, it was formally accepted for use by the British Army and given the name "Sexton" (after the religious custodian and following in the tradition of the Bishop and the Deacon self-propelled guns).

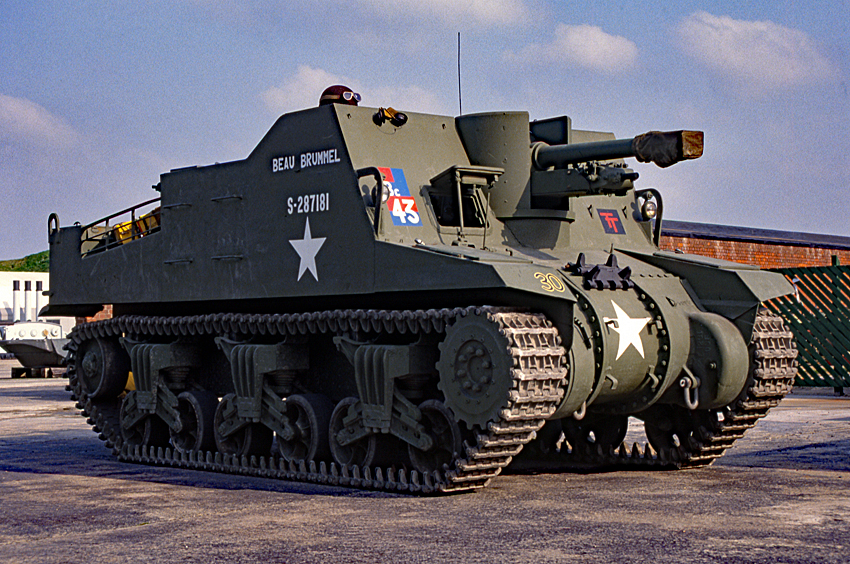
Sexton self-propelled gun S287181 Beau Brummel.

A UK order for 300 Sextons was made in mid-1943, albeit built on the hull of the Grizzly tank (a Canadian-built variant of the M4A1 Sherman). The Ram-based SP gun became known as the Sexton Mark I, while the Grizzly-based variant was the Sexton Mark II. UK orders for the Sexton II eventually totalled 2,026 vehicles.

The Sexton was generally regarded as a successful project, unlike the Ram (which never saw combat in its original form). Between 1943 and 1945, the Montreal Locomotive Works manufactured 2,150 Sextons for the use of both Canadian and British forces. The vehicle entered service in September 1943. In spite of its confused origins, the Sexton was a combination of proven parts and proved to be a successful design that remained in British service until 1956.

== Operational service ==
The vehicles were first used in combat in Italy by the British Eighth Army. Later, Sextons took part in the invasion of France and subsequent Battle of Normandy and the campaign in north-western Europe. During the D-day landings, a number of Sextons were ordered to fire from their landing craft as they approached the beaches although the fire did not prove to be very accurate. After the war, a number of units were equipped with the Sexton as part of the British Army of the Rhine (BAOR).

The following units were equipped with the Sexton at different periods:

- 1st Regiment Royal Horse Artillery, Italy 1944-45, post-war (Sexton withdrawn in 1956)
- 2nd Regiment, Royal Horse Artillery, Italy 1944-45, post-war (Sexton withdrawn in 1957)
- 3rd Regiment Royal Horse Artillery, post-war
- 4/22 Field Regiment (South African Irish and Transvaal Horse Artillery), South African Artillery, 6th South African Armoured Division, Italy 1944-45 (January 1944 to August 1944 then replaced by the M7 Priest when the Division transferred to US IV Corps US 5th Army )
- 5th Regiment Royal Horse Artillery, North West Europe 1944–45; post-war
- 6th Field (Self Propelled) Regiment, Royal Artillery, post-war
- 10th Field Regiment, Royal Artillery, post-war
- 13th (HAC) Regiment, Royal Horse Artillery, North West Europe 1944-45
- 86th (East Anglian) (Hertfordshire Yeomanry) Field Regiment, Royal Artillery, North West Europe 1944-45
- 90th(City of London) Field Regiment, Royal Artillery, North West Europe 1944-45
- 98th Field Regiment (Surrey & Sussex Yeomanry Queen Mary's), Royal Artillery, North West Europe 1945
- 147th (Essex Yeomanry) Field Regiment, Royal Artillery, North West Europe 1944-45
- 153rd (Leicestershire Yeomanry) Field Regiment, Royal Artillery, North West Europe 1944-45

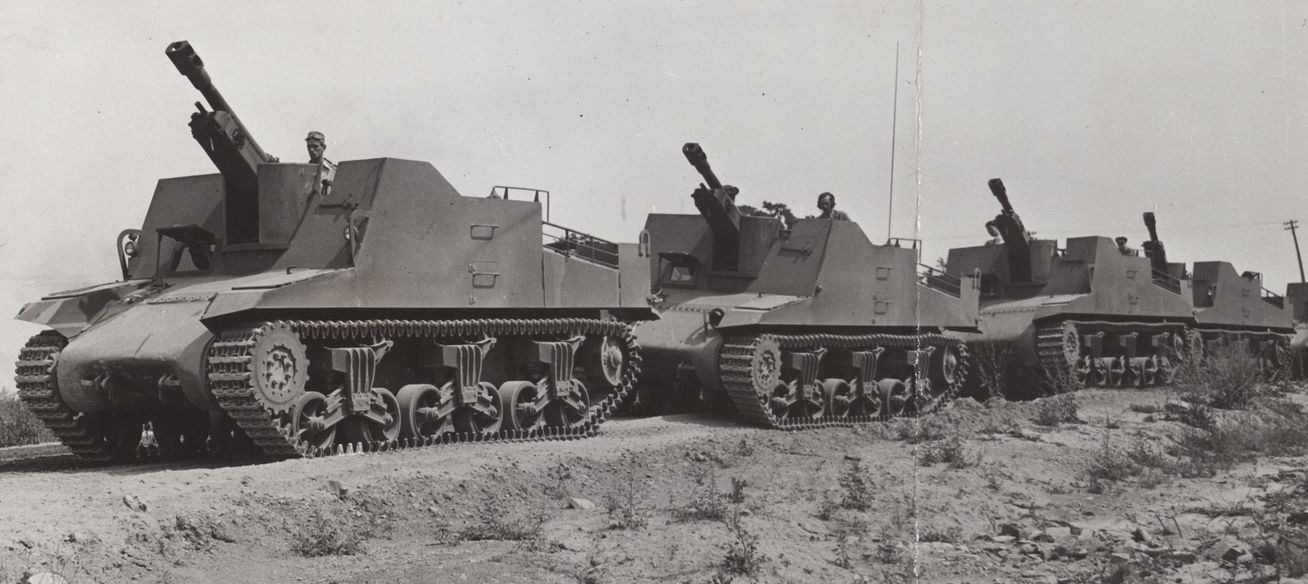
Canadian Sextons in 1944

British and Canadian forces used the Sexton for indirect supporting fire, keeping the Sextons back from the front line and used forward observers to direct overwhelming fire onto a target.

The Indian 1st and 2nd Field Artillery Regiments used Sextons after World War II.

== Variants ==
- Sexton I: The first 125 vehicles manufactured. Based on the Ram tank hull.
- Sexton II: It featured boxes added to the rear deck to carry batteries and an auxiliary generator to charge them. Based on the Grizzly (M4A1 Sherman) hull.
- Sexton GPO (Gun Position Officer): The 25 pounder was removed and an extra No. 19 Wireless was added along with map tables; this vehicle was used to control battery fire.

== British self-propelled gun naming ==
A British self-propelled gun armed with the Ordnance QF 25-pounder in design from 1941 was given the service name "Bishop" as its appearance was said to resemble a bishop's mitre. A replacement, the US 105mm Howitzer Motor Carriage M7, was called "Priest" by the British, as part of its superstructure was said to resemble a priest's pulpit. Following this line of names, a 1942 self-propelled QF 6 pounder on an armoured truck chassis was named "Deacon". A post-war self-propelled gun was called Abbot.

== See also ==
25-pdr Sexton self-propelled artillery vehicle moving during demonstration at Fort Nelson, Hampshire

25-pdr Sexton self-propelled artillery vehicle firing during demonstration at Fort Nelson, Hampshire

- Yeramba – an Australian self-propelled 25-pdr, introduced in 1950.

== Sources ==
- Chris Ellis, Peter Chamberlain - AFV No. 13 - Ram and Sexton, Profile Publications, England
- Chamberlain, Peter; Ellis, Chris (1981) [1969], British and American Tanks of World War II (2nd US ed.), Arco Publishing
