= Deakin =

Deakin may refer to:

== Places ==
- Deakin University, Victoria, Australia
- Deakin, Australian Capital Territory, suburb of Canberra, Australia
- Deakin, Western Australia, siding on the Trans-Australian Railway
- Division of Deakin, Australian Electoral Division in Victoria, Australia

== People ==
- Deakin (surname), including a list of people with the surname
- Deakin (musician) (born 1978), American musician, member of Animal Collective

== Other ==
- Evans Deakin & Company, Australian shipbuilders
- Alfred Deakin High School in the suburb Deakin, Canberra, Australia.

== See also ==
- Deakins
- Deacon
- Deacon (disambiguation)
