= Ordnance QF 25-pounder =

British field gun and gun-howitzer used during the Second World War

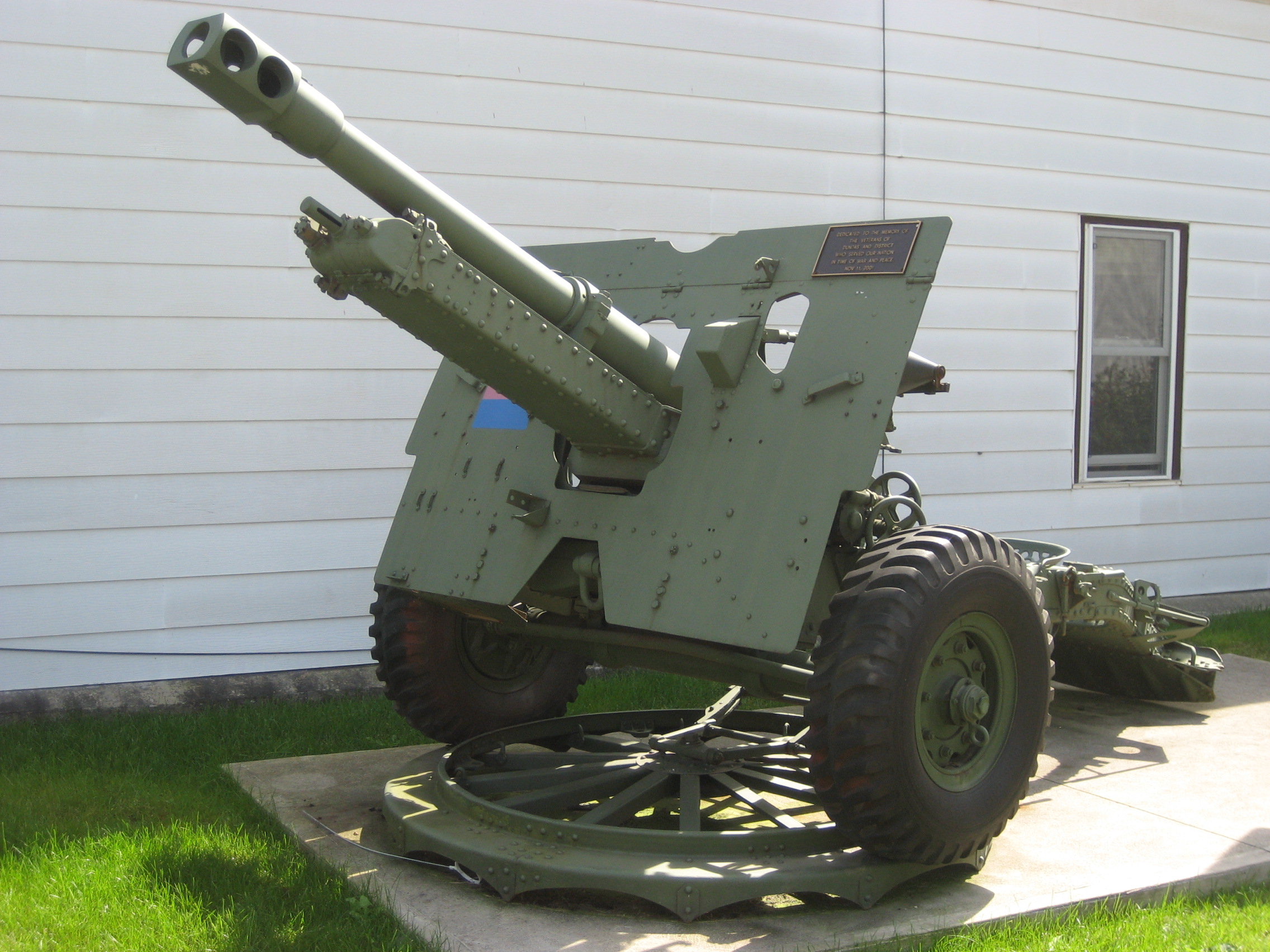
- Ordnance QF 25-pounder gun mounted on its firing platform in Dundas, Hamilton, Canada
- Type: Field gun Gun-howitzer
- Place of origin: United Kingdom

Service history
- In service: 1940–present
- Used by: See Operators
- Wars: World War II; Indonesian National Revolution; Indochina War; Indo-Pakistani War of 1947; Greek Civil War; 1948 Arab–Israeli War; Malayan Emergency; Korean War; Second Arab–Israeli War; Sino-Indian War; Indo-Pakistani War of 1965; Portuguese Colonial War; Rhodesian Bush War; South African Border War; Nigerian Civil War; Six-Day War; Indo-Pakistani War of 1971; Dhofar Rebellion; Turkish invasion of Cyprus; Iran–Iraq War; Lebanese Civil War; Sri Lankan civil war; Iraqi Civil War

Production history
- Designed: 1930s
- Manufacturer: Royal Ordnance
- Variants: See variants

Specifications (Mk II on Carriage Mk I)
- Mass: 1,633 kg (3,600 lb)
- Length: 4.6 m (15 ft 1 in) muzzle to towing eye
- Barrel length: 2.47 m (8 ft 1 in) (28 calibres)
- Width: 2.13 m (7 ft) at wheel hubs
- Height: 1.16 m (3 ft 10 in) trunnion height
- Crew: 6
- Shell: 88 x 292mm R High explosive Anti-tank; Smoke; HESH
- Shell weight: 11.5 kg (25 lb) (HE including fuze)
- Calibre: 3.45 in (87.63 mm)
- Breech: Vertical sliding-block
- Recoil: Hydro-pneumatic
- Elevation: -5° to 45° (80° with dial sight adapter and digging trail pit or wheel mounds)
- Traverse: 4° Left & Right (top traverse); 360° (platform)
- Rate of fire: Gunfire, 6–8 rpm Intense, 5 rpm Rapid, 4 rpm Normal, 3 rpm Slow, 2 rpm Very slow, 1 rpm
- Muzzle velocity: 198 to 532 m/s (650 to 1,750 ft/s)
- Maximum firing range: 12,253 m (13,400 yd) (HE shell)
- Sights: Calibrating & reciprocating

The Ordnance QF 25-pounder, or more simply 25-pounder or 25-pdr, with a calibre of 3.45 inches (87.6 mm), was a piece of field artillery used by British and Commonwealth forces in the Second World War. Durable, easy to operate and versatile, it was the most produced and used British field gun and gun-howitzer during the war.

It was introduced into service just before the War started and combined both high-angle and direct-fire abilities, a relatively high rate of fire, and a reasonably lethal shell, with a highly mobile piece. Initial production was slow but, by 1945, over 12,000 had been manufactured. It remained the British Army's primary artillery field piece well into the 1960s, with smaller numbers used in training units until the 1980s. Many Commonwealth countries used theirs in active or reserve service until about the 1970s, and ammunition for the weapon is currently (2020s) being produced by Pakistan Ordnance Factories.

== Design ==
The design was the result of extended studies looking to replace the 18-pounder (3.3-inch (84 mm) bore) field gun and the 4.5-inch howitzer (114.3 mm bore), which had been the main field artillery pieces during the First World War. The basic idea was to build one weapon with the high velocity of the 18-pounder and the variable propelling charges of the howitzer, firing a shell about halfway between the two in size, around 3.5–4.0 inches (89–102 mm) of about 30 pounds (14 kg).

Development during the inter-war period was severely hampered by a lack of money and it was eventually decided to build a new design from existing 18-pounders by converting barrels but designing a new barrel and carriage for production when funds were available. The result was a 3.45 inches (87.6 mm) weapon firing a shell weighing 25 pounds (11.3 kg). It was mounted on late model 18-pounder carriages. One of these used a circular firing platform and this was adopted for the new guns. The firing platform was attached to the gun and, when lowered, the gun was pulled onto it. This platform transferred most of the recoil forces to the ground, instead of using the spade at the end of the trail, making the gun very stable when firing. It also provided a smooth flat surface for the carriage to rotate on using the road wheels, this enabled the gunners to traverse the carriage quickly in any direction.

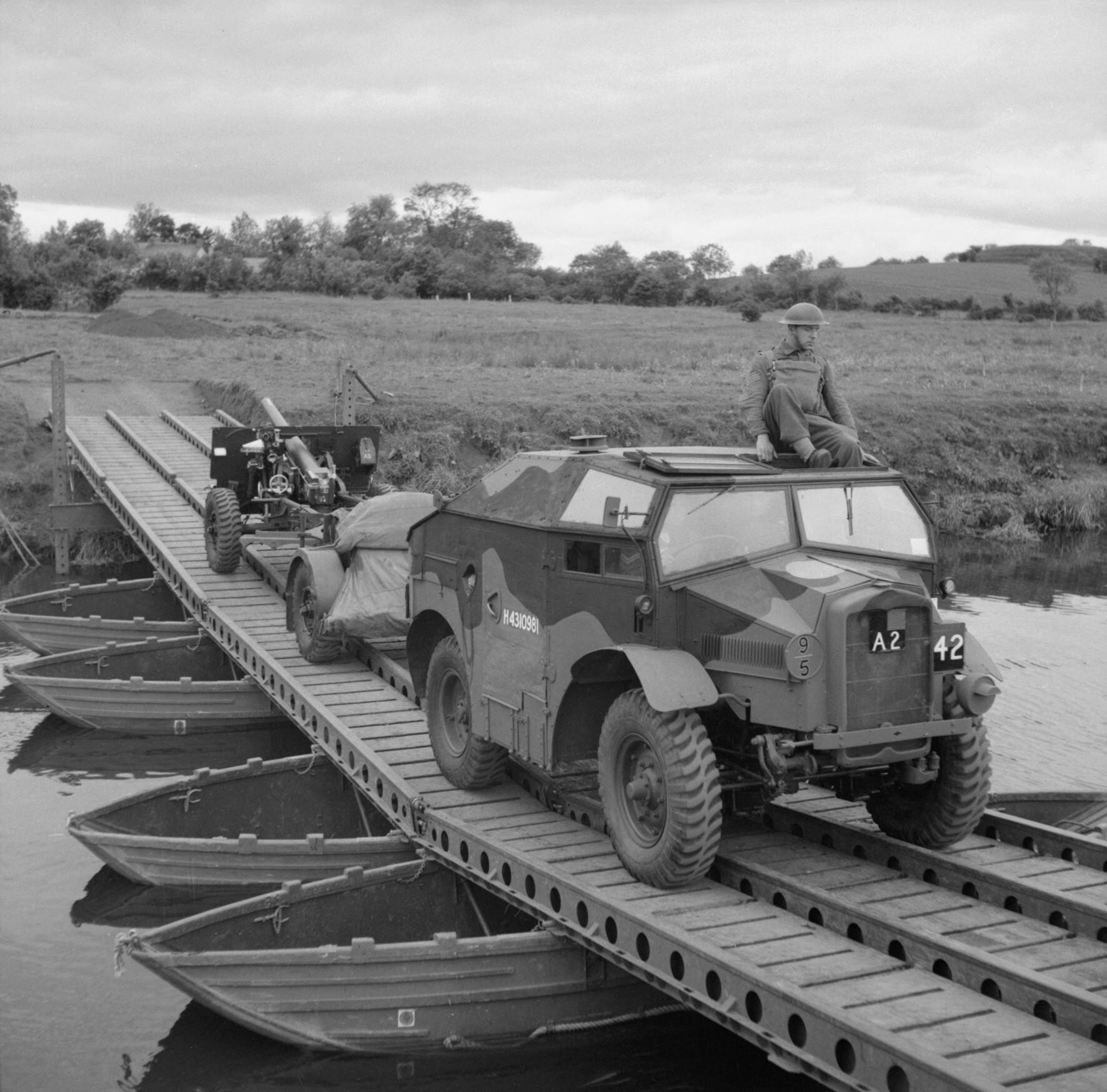
A 25-pounder field gun and limber, towed by a Morris Commercial "Quad", crossing a pontoon bridge at Slaght Bridge in County Antrim, Northern Ireland, 26 June 1942

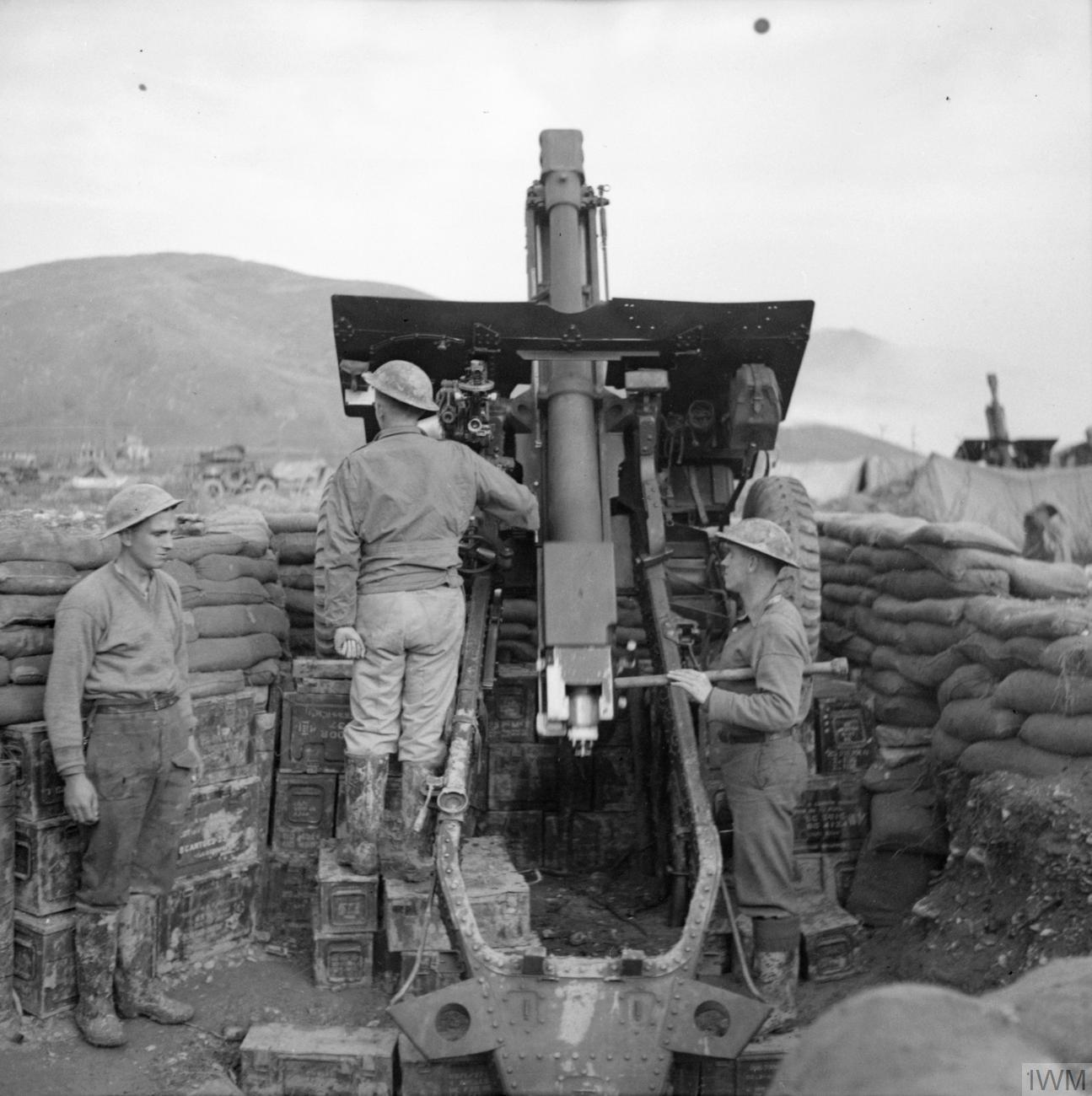
A 25-pounder with its wheels elevated on ammunition boxes for an extremely high angle of fire, San Clemente, Italy 2 December 1944

Unlike the 18-pounder, the 25-pounder used howitzer-type variable-charge ammunition. The 25-pounder was separate-loading; the shell was loaded and rammed, then the cartridge in its brass case was loaded and the breech closed. In British terminology, the 25-pounder was called "quick firing" (QF), originally because the cartridge case provided rapid loading compared with bag charges, and was automatically released when the breech was opened.

The use of separate shell and cartridge allowed the charge to be changed for different ranges. For the Mk 1 Ordnance on an 18-pounder carriage, there were three "charges", charges one, two and three, all of which could be used in the common cartridge design. The Mk 2 Ordnance on Mk 1 carriage added a "super" charge in a different cartridge. In 1943, a separately bagged "increment" charge was added; used with the Super, it provided higher velocity for anti-tank use. The introduction of the increment to super was only possible following the addition of the muzzle-brake in the previous year. Subsequently, another type of increment was introduced to be added to charges one and two to provide additional combinations for use in high angle fire. However, this fire required a dial sight adaptor, removal of the platform and some excavation of the ground.

In common with all British guns of the period, the indirect fire sight was "calibrating". This meant that the range, not elevation angle, was set on the sight. The sight compensated for the difference in the gun's muzzle velocities from standard. The gun was also fitted with a direct-fire telescope for use with armour-piercing shot. It also used "one-man laying" in accordance with normal British practice.

An important part of the gun was the ammunition trailer ("trailer, artillery, No 27"). The gun was hooked to it and the trailer hooked to the tractor for towing. The gun did not need a limber and could be hooked directly to a tractor. The trailer provided the brakes as only a hand-brake was fitted to the gun carriage. The trailer carried ammunition; thirty-two rounds in trays (two rounds per tray) in the trailer protected by two doors. Ammunition was also carried in the gun tractor with the detachment and various gun stores. Some stores, such as sights, were carried cased on the gun. Each section (two guns) had a third tractor that carried ammunition and towed two ammunition trailers.

The normal gun detachment comprised six men:

- No 1 – detachment commander (a sergeant)
- No 2 – operated the breech and rammed the shell
- No 3 – layer
- No 4 – loader
- No 5 – ammunition
- No 6 – ammunition, normally the "coverer" – second in command and responsible for ammunition preparation and operating the fuze indicator

The official "reduced detachment" was four men.

== Production ==
Many different companies manufactured the guns and component parts in the UK. Vickers-Armstrongs in Scotswood, Baker Perkins in Peterborough and Weirs in Glasgow were some of the most significant. The various Royal Ordnance factories produced most of the ordnance components. In Canada, Sorel Industries built complete guns and provided the ordnance for fitting to the Sexton. Australia also built complete guns, choosing to weld the carriages rather than rivet, as was the practice in the UK and Canada. In all, over 13,000 were made worldwide.

== Ammunition ==
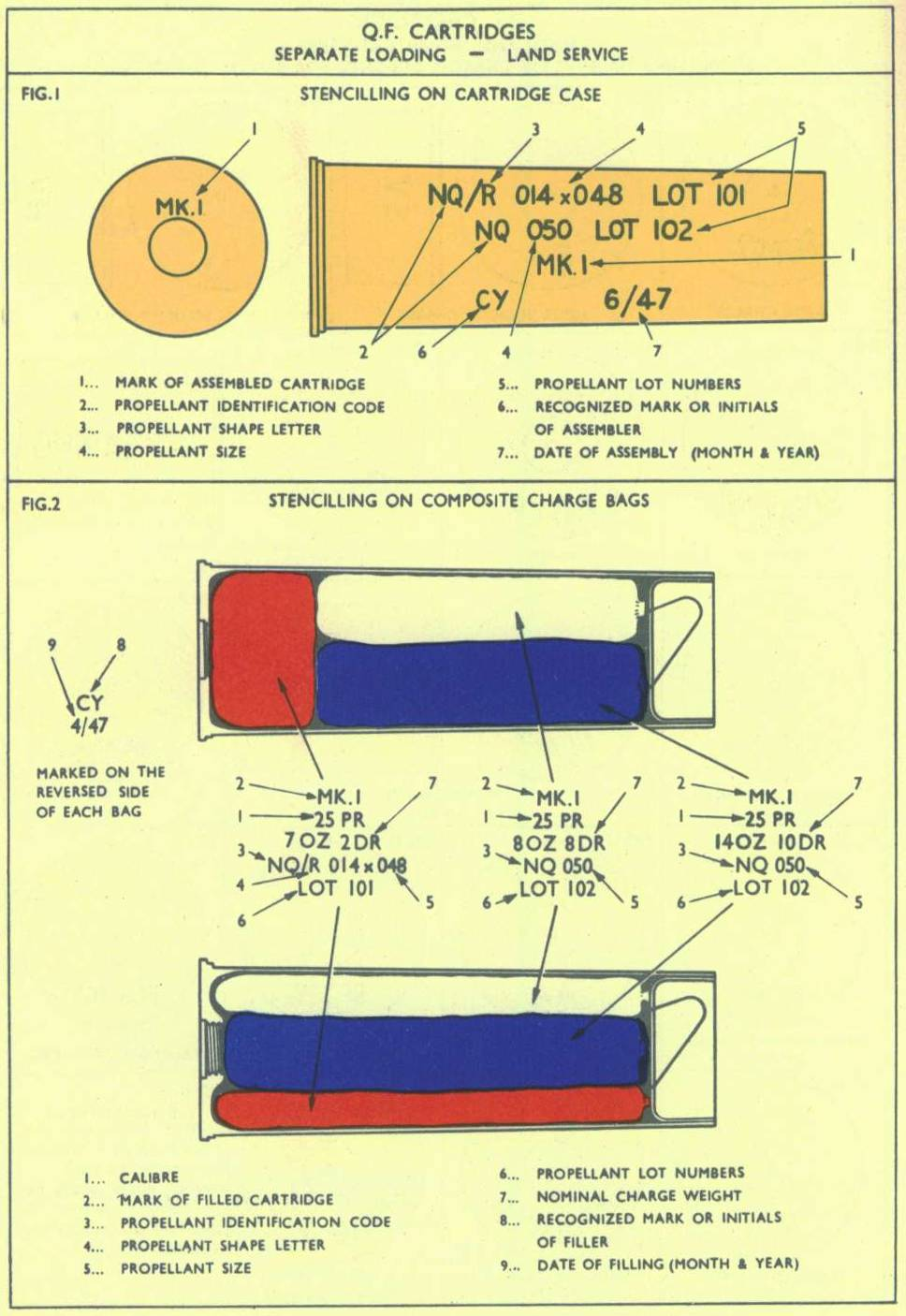
Normal cartridge arrangements

The 25-pounder fired "separate" or two-part ammunition – the projectile was loaded separately from the propelling charge in its (usually brass) cartridge case with its integral primer. Typically for a quick-firing gun, the cartridge case provided obturation.

There were two types of cartridge. The normal cartridge contained three cloth charge bags (coloured red, white and blue). White or blue bags would be removed from the cartridge to give "charge one" or "charge two", leaving all three bags in the cartridge case gave "charge three". The cartridge case was closed at the top with a leatherboard cup. The second type of cartridge was "super", which provided one charge only. The cup could not be removed from the cartridge case. In 1943, an incremental charge of 5.5 oz (160 g) of cordite ("super-plus") was introduced to raise the muzzle velocity when firing armour-piercing shot with charge super; this required a muzzle brake to be fitted. Adoption of "upper-register" (high-angle) fire needed more charges to improve the range overlap. This led to the development of the "intermediate increment" of 4oz cordite, which was introduced in 1944. The bags were striped red and white to indicate that they should only be used with charges one and two. When one bag was used with charge 1, it provided charge 1/2. When one was added to charge 2, it provided charge 2 1/3, and two bags, charge 2 2/3. This allowed a range of seven different charges instead of four.

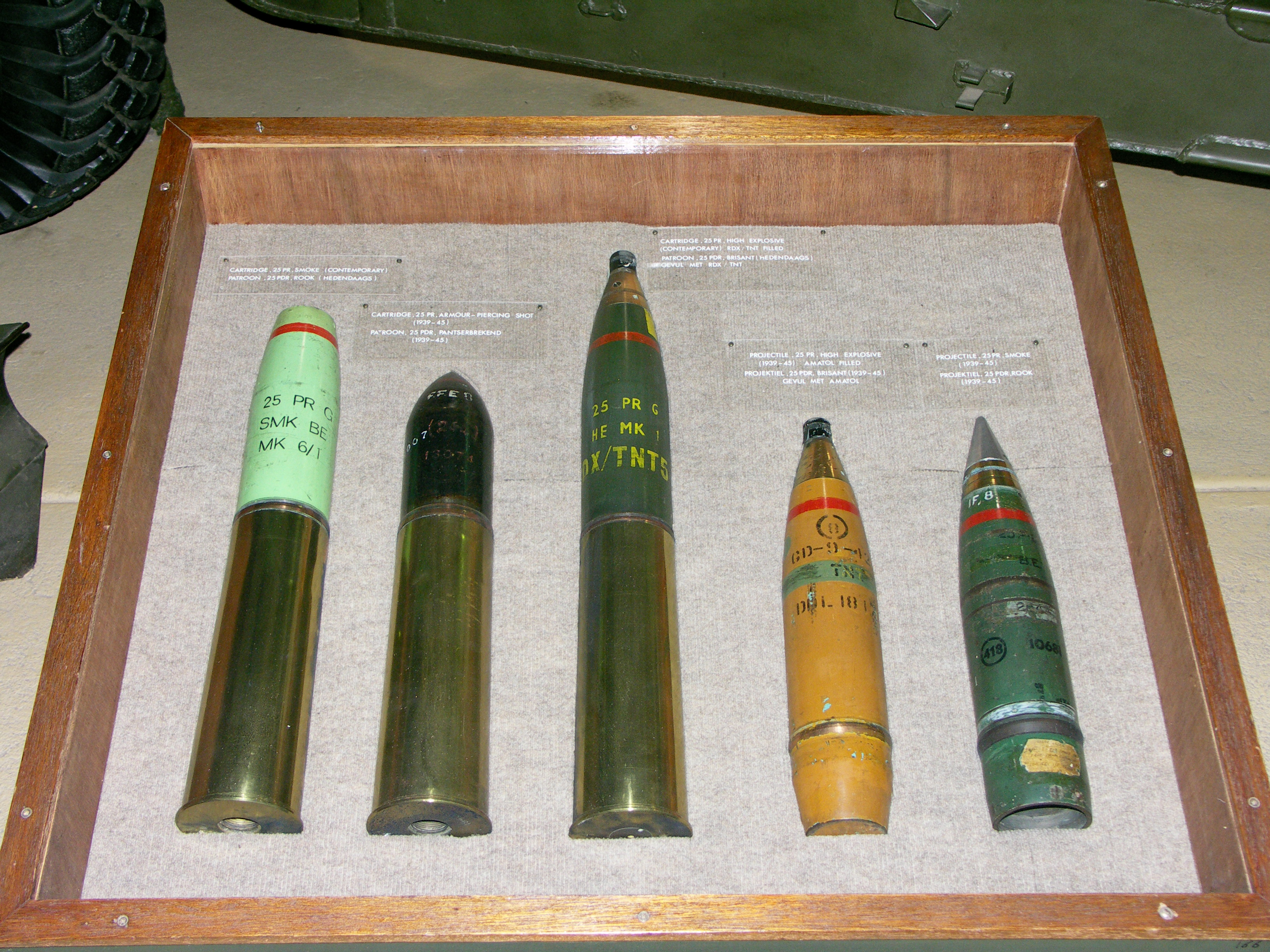
Display of 25-pounder shells and cases. Left to right: smoke, armour-piercing (pre-1955 UK markings), HE (RDX/TNT, strange markings), HE (Amatol, pre-1955 UK markings), smoke (pre-1955 UK markings). Although some shells are shown in the cases, the shell and the case were separate items.

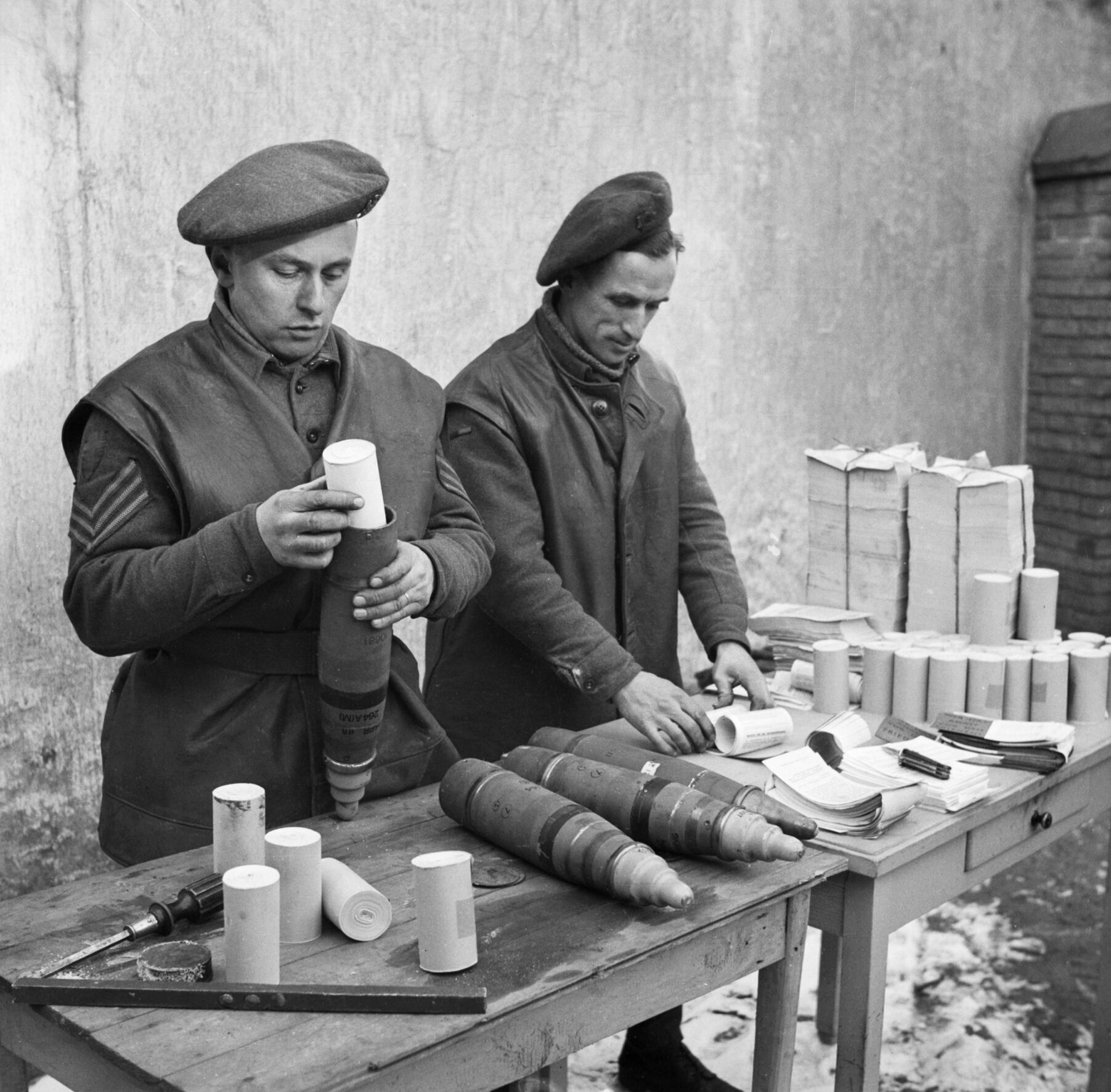
Royal Artillery gunners fill 25-pounder shells with propaganda leaflets. Roermond, The Netherlands, January 1945.

There were many marks of cartridge, mostly differentiated by propellant type. Double-base propellant (nitrocellulose/nitroglycerine) was the UK standard but one mark used US single-base (nitrocellulose only). However, triple-base nitrocellulose/nitroglycerine/picrite was used throughout the war and eventually replaced all others.

The 25-pounder's main ammunition was the high-explosive (HE) streamlined shell with a 5/10 CRH ogive and boat tail. The explosive filling was 1.824 lb (0.827 kg) of TNT or Amatol. It was also provided with base ejection smoke (white and coloured), star shells, and chemical shells. Incendiary and coloured flare shells were developed but not introduced into service, and smoke shells were sometimes reloaded with propaganda leaflets or metal foil "window". The UK did not develop a WP smoke shell for the 25-pounder.

For anti-tank use, the 25-pounder was also supplied with a limited amount of 20 pounds (9.1 kg) solid armour-piercing (AP) shot, later replaced with a more potent version with a ballistic cap (APBC). The AP shot was fired with maximum charge, charge No. 3, super, or super with Super increment depending on the ordnance mark, as muzzle velocity was critical in direct fire for penetration and a flat trajectory.

A shaped charge anti-tank shell was under development in Canada, but the introduction of the three-inch (76.2 mm) calibre QF 17-pounder, an anti-tank gun, in 1944 ended its development. After the Second World War, the UK replaced AP shot with a HESH shell. Coloured marker shells (dye and PETN) were also developed but not introduced.

The standard fuze was No 117 direct action (DA). No 119 (DA and graze) was also used. Combustion or mechanical time fuzes were used with base ejection shells and mechanical time with graze were used with HE. Proximity fuzes were used from the end of 1944 and subsequently replaced by CVT fuzes.

== British service ==
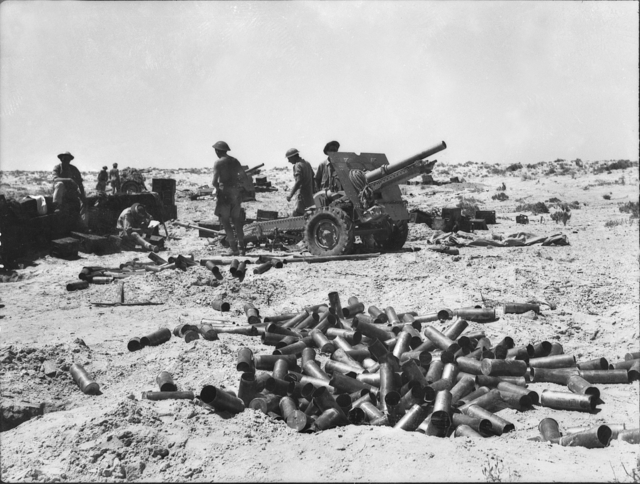
An Australian 25-pounder at El Alamein in July 1942

The 25-pounder was the main field artillery weapon used by British Commonwealth and colonial infantry and armoured divisions of all types during the Second World War. It was also used by the RAF Regiment in North Africa. Throughout the war, each British-pattern infantry division was established with 72 25-pounders, in three field artillery regiments. Armoured divisions were eventually standardised with two field artillery regiments, one of which was self-propelled (see below). Before mid-1940, each regiment had two batteries of twelve guns; after that date, regiments changed to batteries of eight guns and added a third battery, a process that was not completed until early 1943. In the late 1950s, the British Army reverted to batteries of six guns. Field artillery regiments had two batteries of 25-pounders and one of 5.5 inch guns.

The early 18- and 25-pounders had been towed in the field by the Morris CDSW or the earlier Vickers Light Dragon Mk. III, a tracked vehicle derived from the Vickers DA50 which was also the basis of the Bren or Universal Carrier. Throughout most of the Second World War, the 25-pounder was normally towed, with its limber, behind a 4×4 field artillery tractor called a "quad". These were manufactured by Morris, Guy and Karrier in England, and, in greater numbers, as the Canadian Military Pattern field artillery tractor by Ford and Chevrolet in Canada. In the 1950s, the British Army replaced the various "quads" with a new Bedford three-ton gun tower fitted with a specialist body.

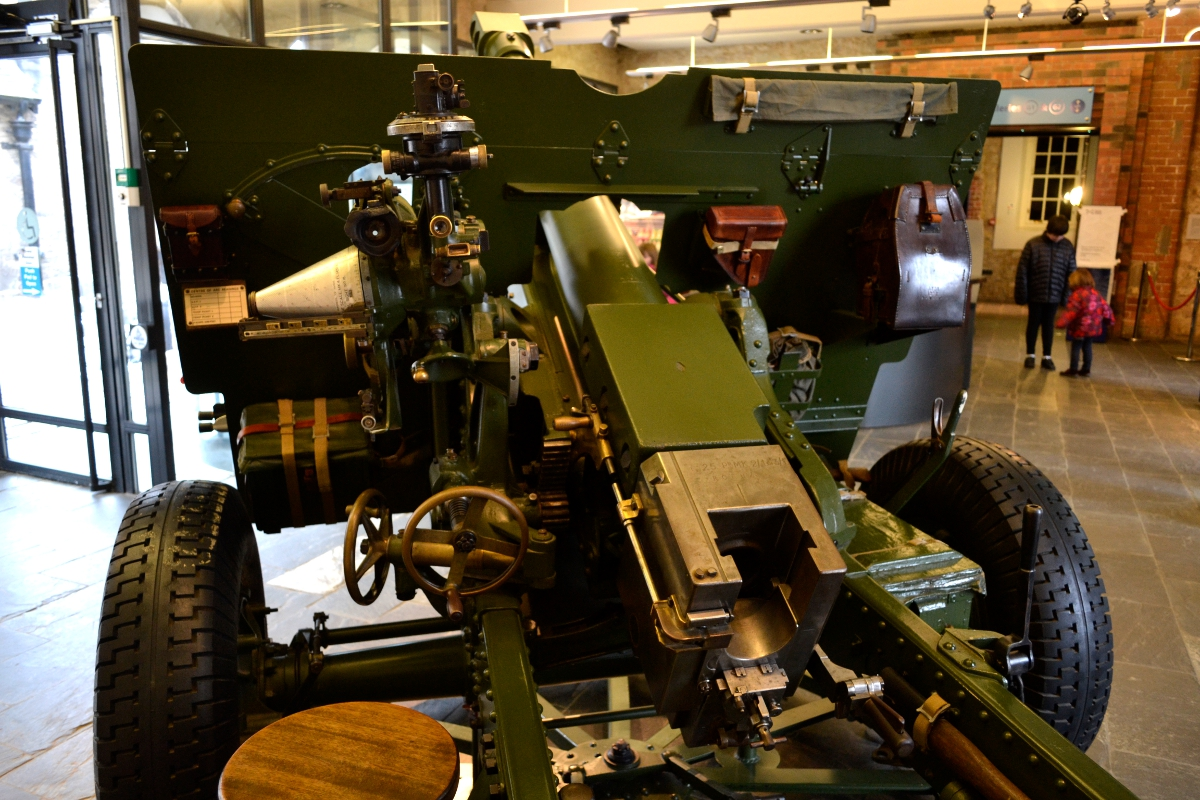
Gunner's view; 25-pounder on display at Edinburgh Castle

In 1941, the British Army improvised a self-propelled 25-pounder named the Bishop, on the chassis of the Valentine tank. This mount proved unsatisfactory and the Bishops were replaced in 1942 by the American M7 Priest, which did not use the 25-Pounder complicating the supply of ammunition in the field. The Priests were replaced in 1944 by the Sexton, which used the 25-Pounder. The Sexton was designed, and mostly manufactured, in Canada (some two thirds of the ordnance and mountings were imported from the UK due to limited Canadian production capacity) and was the result of mounting a 25-pounder on a Ram or Grizzly tank chassis.

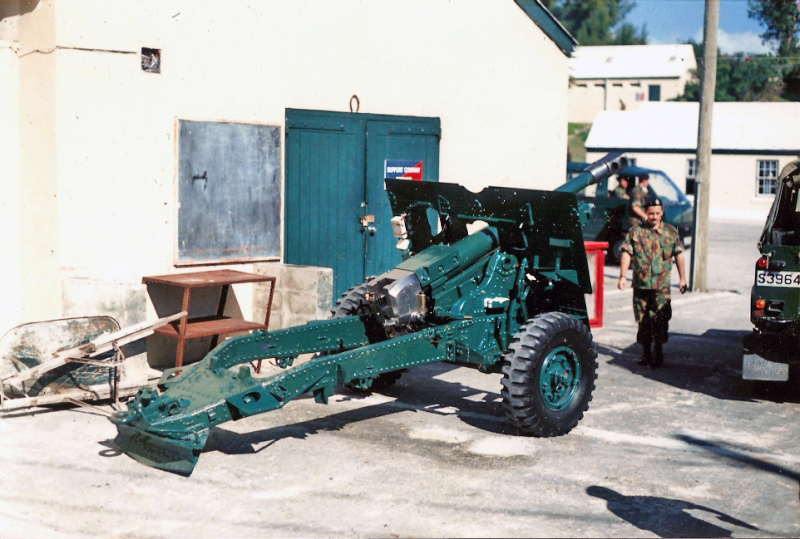
A 25-pounder of the ceremonial Gun Troop of the Royal Bermuda Regiment

By Second World War standards, the 25-pounder had a smaller calibre and lower shell-weight than many other field-artillery weapons, although it had longer range than most. (Most forces had entered the war with even smaller 75 mm (3.0 in) designs but had quickly moved to 105 mm (4.1 in) and larger weapons.) It was designed for the British practice of suppressive (neutralising) fire, not destructive fire that had proved illusory in the early years of the First World War. Nevertheless, the 25-pounder was considered by all to be one of the best artillery pieces in use. The effects caused by the gun (and the speed at which the British artillery control system could respond) in the North-West Europe Campaign of 1944–1945 made many German soldiers believe that the British had secretly deployed an automatic 25-pounder.

In UK service, during the 1960s, most 25-pounders were replaced by the 105mm Abbot SPG, some by the Oto Melara 105mm pack howitzer, and the remainder by the 105mm L118 light gun. The last British military unit to fire the 25-pounder in its field role (as opposed to ceremonial use) was the Gun Troop of the Honourable Artillery Company on Salisbury Plain in 1992.

== Service with other nations ==
A 25-pounder firing a blank at Royal Armouries Museum, Fort Nelson

In addition to Commonwealth and colonial forces, other Second World War users included the free forces of France, Greece, Poland, Czechoslovakia, Netherlands, Belgium and Luxembourg. After the Second World War, 25-pounders remained in service with many Commonwealth armies into the 1960s. They were used in Korea by British, Canadian and New Zealand regiments and in Malaya by British and Australian batteries. They also featured in wars on the Indian sub-continent and in the service of Israeli and other Middle Eastern armies.

=== Australia ===
Australia used the 25-pounder extensively, including in WW2, Korea and the Malayan Emergency. They were kept in use by reserve units until the 1970s. Individual guns are now often seen as fixed memorials in memorial parks and Returned Servicemen's clubs. 1527 complete guns were manufactured in Australia from May 1941. Domestic production allowed the 25-pounder to be mounted in Australian-produced vehicles, such as the (prototype) Thunderbolt tank and the post-war self-propelled gun, the Yeramba. This led to Australian development of a short-barrelled lighter version which was more suitable for off-road deployment, as required, e.g., in the New Guinea campaign. 213 of the shortened guns were produced, starting in 1943. These were declared obsolescent and placed in storage in 1946.

=== South Africa ===
The gun was called G1 by the South African Defence Force. It was extensively used in the early stages of the South African Border War, including Operation Savannah. The G1 is still used in the ceremonial role.

=== Rhodesia ===
The Rhodesian Army used the Ordnance QF 25 pounder Mark III (nicknamed "88mm gun/howitzer") during the Bush War and 16 to 24 guns were fielded by the 1st Field Regiment, Rhodesian Artillery, but by this stage their rounds could not penetrate enemy bunkers.

=== Sri Lanka ===
The Ordnance QF 25 pounder Mark III was added to the Sri Lankan Army inventory in 1985. These were supplied by Pakistan at the early stages of the Sri Lankan civil war and were fielded by the 6th Field Regiment, Sri Lanka Artillery, which was raised in September 1985. It was replaced by 122 mm Type 60 howitzers, but still remains in service with the Ceremonial Saluting Battery of the 6th Field Regiment.

=== Ireland ===
In 1949, 48 ex-British-Army Mark III 25-pounders were acquired by the Irish Defence Forces and were in service with the reserves until 2009, having been replaced in the army by the 105 mm Light Gun in 1981. The Irish Army maintains a six-gun ceremonial 25-pounder battery for use on state occasions.

=== India ===
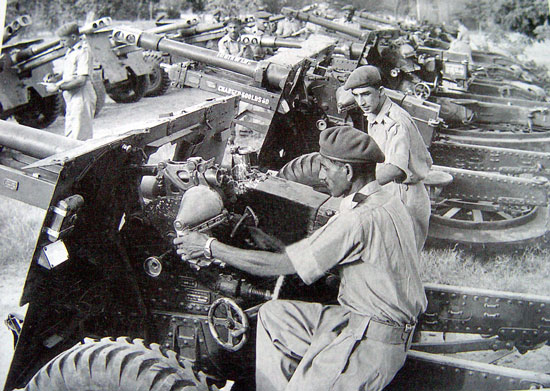
Pakistan army soldiers examine captured Indian QF-25 pounders at Chumb during the 1965 War.

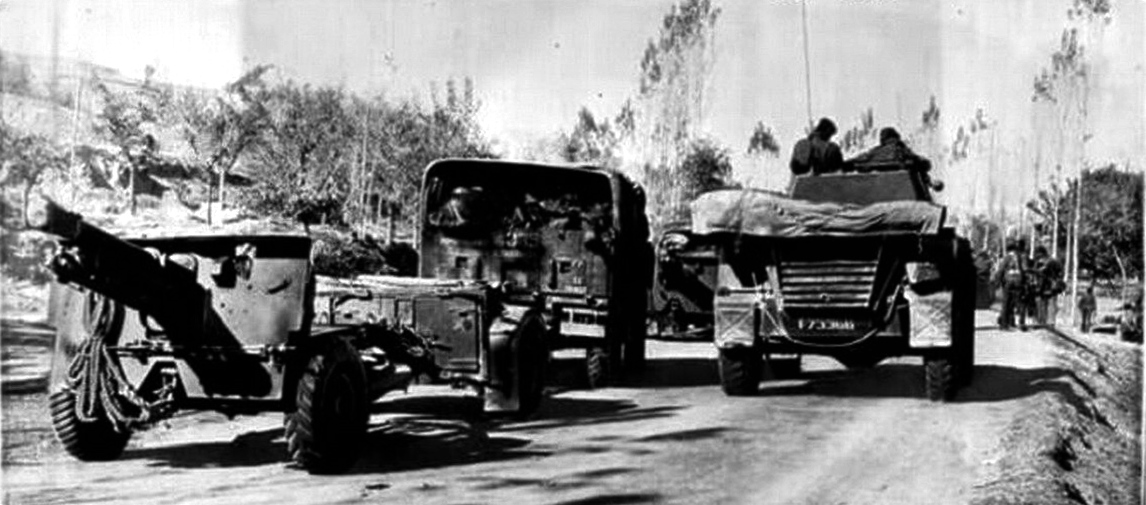
A Pakistan Army convoy equipped with QF-25 pounders, advances in Kashmir during 1947-1948 war

The Indian Army used 25-pounders against Pakistan during the Indo-Pakistani War of 1947, the Indo-Pakistani War of 1965 and the Indo-Pakistani War of 1971 and against China during the Sino-Indian War in 1962.

=== Jordan ===
The Jordanian Arab Legion deployed eight 25-pounder field guns during the fighting in 1948. Later, the Royal Jordanian Army deployed several batteries of 25-pounders during the Six-Day War.

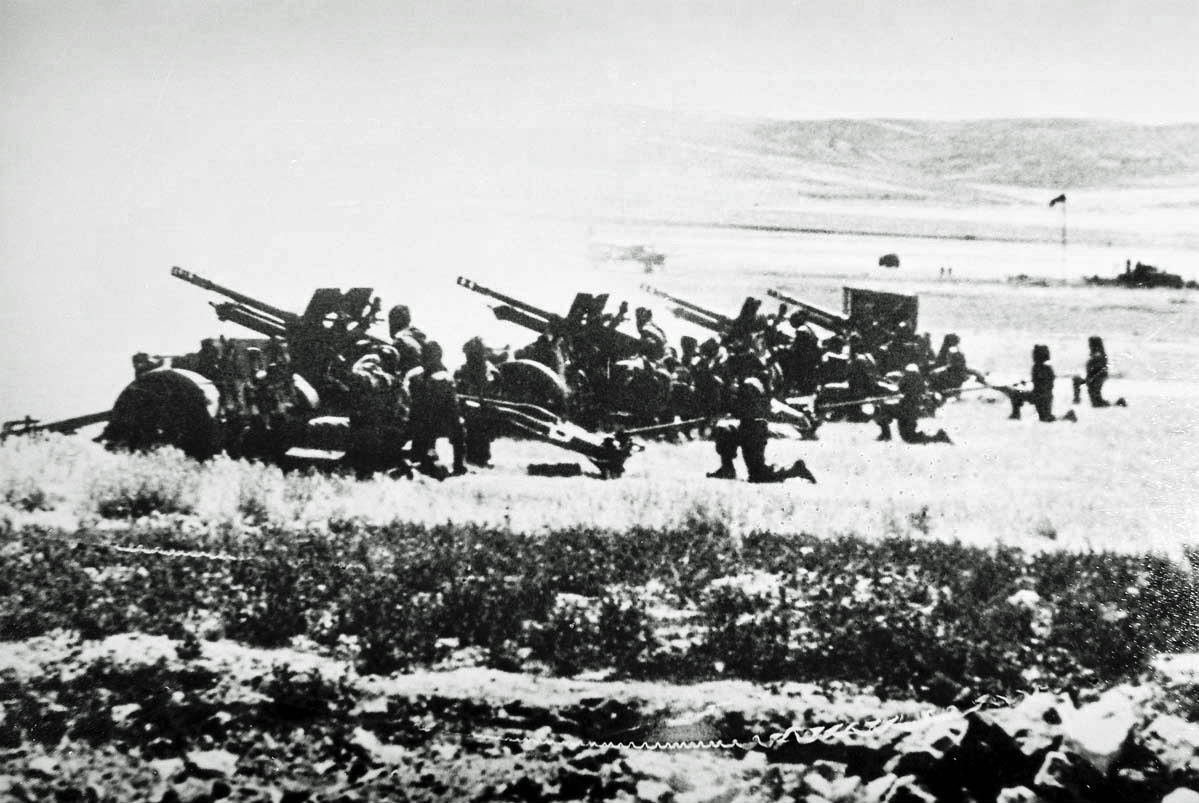
Jordanian gunners firing 25-pounder field guns at Karameh, 1968

=== Lebanon ===
The Lebanese Army aligned twenty-one QF Mk III 25-Pounders on its inventory in 1975, with most of them being subsequently seized by the Tigers Militia and the Kataeb Regulatory Forces (KRF) militia in February 1976 and passed on to its successor, the Lebanese Forces in 1980, who employed them during the Lebanese Civil War.

=== Luxembourg ===
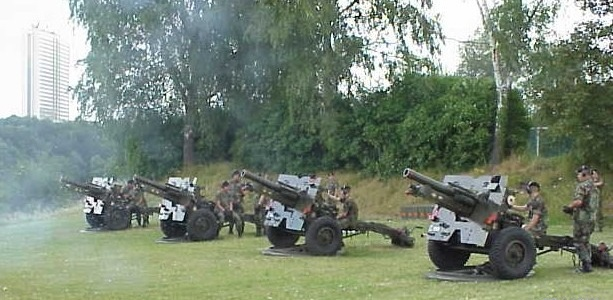
Four Luxembourg 25-pounder guns re-barrelled to 105 mm, used for gun salutes

During World War II, the Free Luxembourgish Forces fielded four 25-pounders, which were named after the four daughters of Grand Duchess Charlotte: Princesses Elisabeth, Marie Adelaide, Marie Gabriele and Alix. Post-war, the Luxembourg Army used a number of 25-pounder guns. In 1955–1957, they were rebarrelled to 105 millimetres (4.1 in) and fitted with new sights. The First Artillery Battalion with 18 guns was placed at the disposal of the 8th Infantry Division of the United States from 1963 to 1967. The last shots fired by the First Luxembourg Artillery Battalion left the tubes on May 31, 1967. Some are maintained for gun salutes.

=== Greece and Cyprus ===
The 25-pounder first entered service with Greek forces in North Africa during WWII. Three (numbered I, II and III) field artillery regiments of 24 pieces each were raised as part of the Greek infantry brigades raised by the Greek government in exile. Their only significant actions were at El Alamein in 1942 and Rimini in 1944. After the end of the Second World War, the 25-pounder served as part of the Greek Army during the Greek Civil War. A total of 125 25-pounder guns were used by the Greek artillery during the civil war of 1946–1949, in various organizational schemes. After the civil war, they were organized into seven independent regiments of 18 guns each. Following Greece's entry into NATO in 1952 and the standardization on American calibres in 1953, the 25-pounders, unlike other models, were not retired but reorganised into 13 battalions of eight guns each, as part of divisional artillery formations. In 1957, the influx of American artillery pieces permitted an increase from 8 to 12 guns per battalion. In 1964, 54 25-pdr guns were handed over from Greece to Cyprus, where they entered service with the Cyprus National Guard organized into four battalions of 12 guns each ( numbered 181, 182, 183 and 185) and one independent battery of six guns (184). They saw action during the Turkish invasion of the island in 1974. The 25-pounders remained in Greek Army service until 1992, when they were retired as part of the CFE agreement. The guns of the Cyprus National Guard remain in storage.

=== New Zealand ===
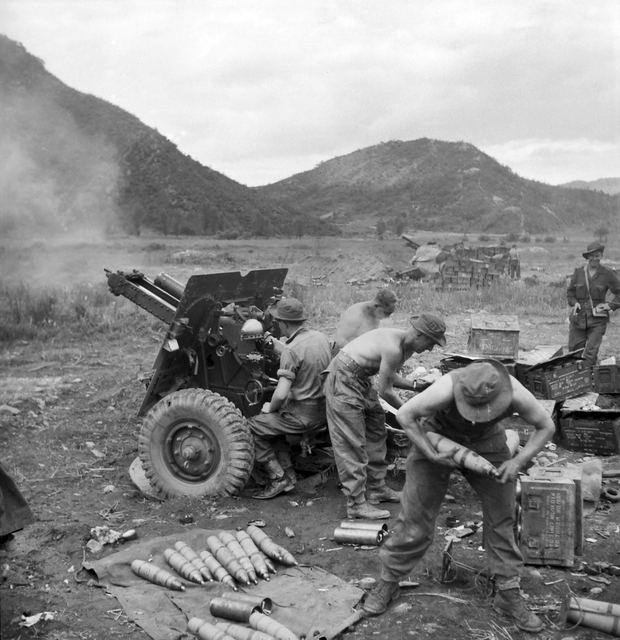
25-pounder gun of the New Zealand Field Battery in Korea

During World War II, New Zealand Gunners of 2nd New Zealand division made extensive use of the 25-pr in Greece, North Africa and Italy. The 16th Field Regiment of the Royal New Zealand Artillery, equipped with 25-pounders, was formed to join the United Nations force in the Korean War. The 25-pdr was replaced in first-line units by the OTO Melara L5 gun. The guns were withdrawn from operational service with Territorial Force Artillery by 1977. Today, 25-pounders remain in service as ceremonial guns.

=== Nigeria ===
The Nigerian Federal Army used 25-pdr guns during the Biafran War. The Nigerian Army still fielded them in 2002.

=== Iraqi Kurdistan ===
A 2015 news report shows at least one 25-pounder in service with Kurdish Peshmerga forces, employed against ISIS positions in Mosul, Iraq.

=== South Vietnam ===
In 1953, the Vietnamese National Army was equipped with 122 QF 25 pounders.

=== United States ===
The first shot fired by US artillery against the Germans in the World War II was from a 25-pounder of the 34th Infantry Division.

== Variants ==
=== Mark I ===
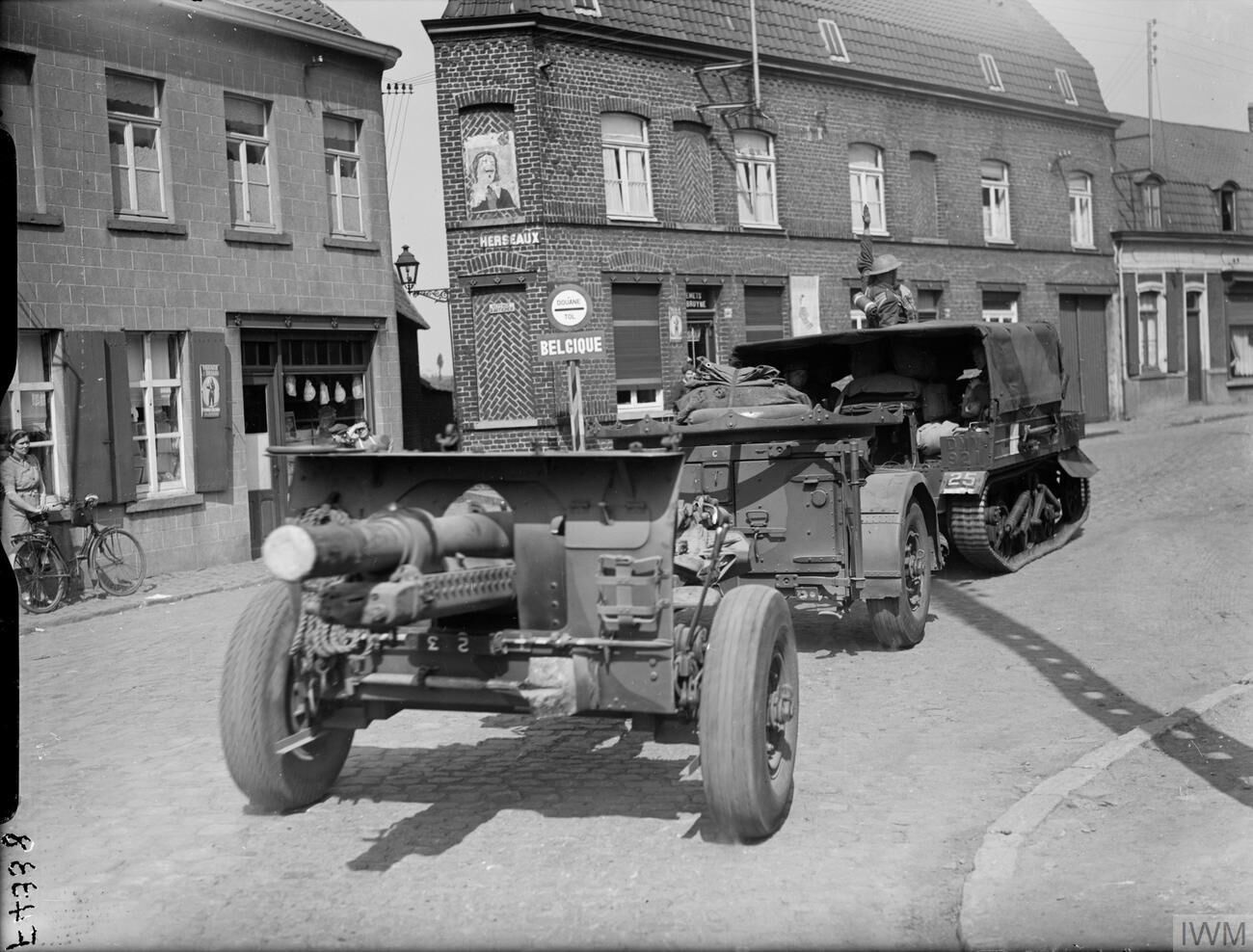
An 18/25 pounder & limber towed by a Vickers Light Dragon Mark III, Belgium, 1940

Known officially as the "Ordnance, Quick Firing 25-pounder Mark I on Carriage 18-pr Mark IV", or "Ordnance, Quick Firing 25-pounder Mark I on Carriage 18-pr Mark V" and commonly called the "18/25-pounder". The Mark I was a 25-pounder barrel and breech in the modified jacket of an 18-pounder gun, as a 'loose liner'. The jacket provided the interface to the 18-pounder carriage. The earliest versions retained 18-pounder type elevation sights but later ones had Probert pattern calibrating sights on the right side of the saddle. The Mark IV P, carriage was a box trail, Mark V P, was a split trail. These conversions of the 18-pounder first entered British service in 1937. A few were lost in the Norwegian campaign and 704 in France, leaving about the same number in the UK's global stocks. They served in North Africa (until about late 1941) and India. This mark of 25-pounder was limited to charge 3 due to its 18-pounder carriage.

=== Mark II ===
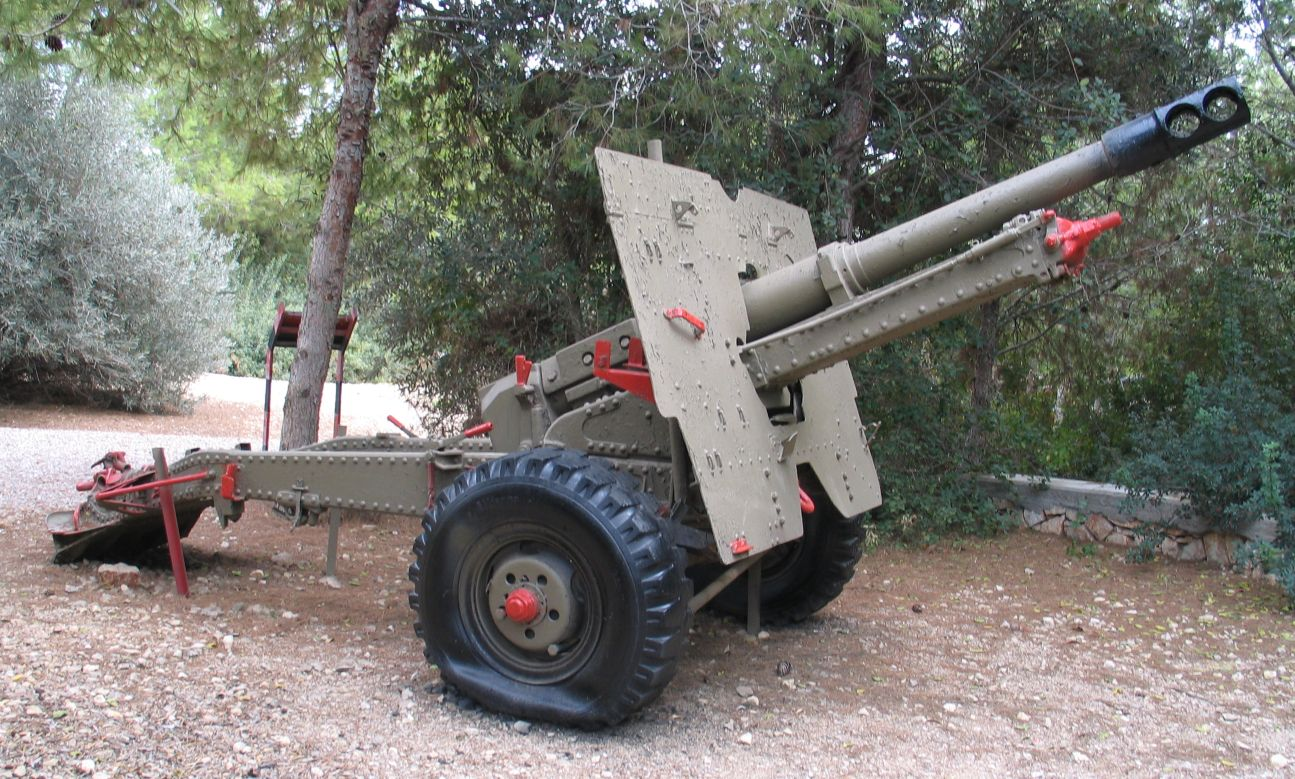
25-pounder with a muzzle brake

The Mark II, fitted to the Mark I carriage, was the standard gun during the war. They were built in Australia and Canada but mostly in UK. Deliveries (from UK production) started at the beginning of 1940 and first entered service with a Canadian regiment stationed in UK during May 1940. No Ordnance 25-pr Mk 2 on Carriage 25-pr Mark 1 were lost in France. This gun fired all charges, 1 – 3 and Super. In 1942, a muzzle brake was fitted to the gun to eliminate the instability caused when firing the 20 lb AP shell with Charge Super at direct fire low elevation angles. To preserve the gun's balance on the trunnions, a counterbalance weight was also fitted, just in front of the breech ring. The designation of the modified gun was not changed. Eventually, all guns serving in Europe were so converted.

The Mark II ordnance had six main marks of the barrel:

Mark I barrel
Original variant with a loose liner.

Mark II barrel

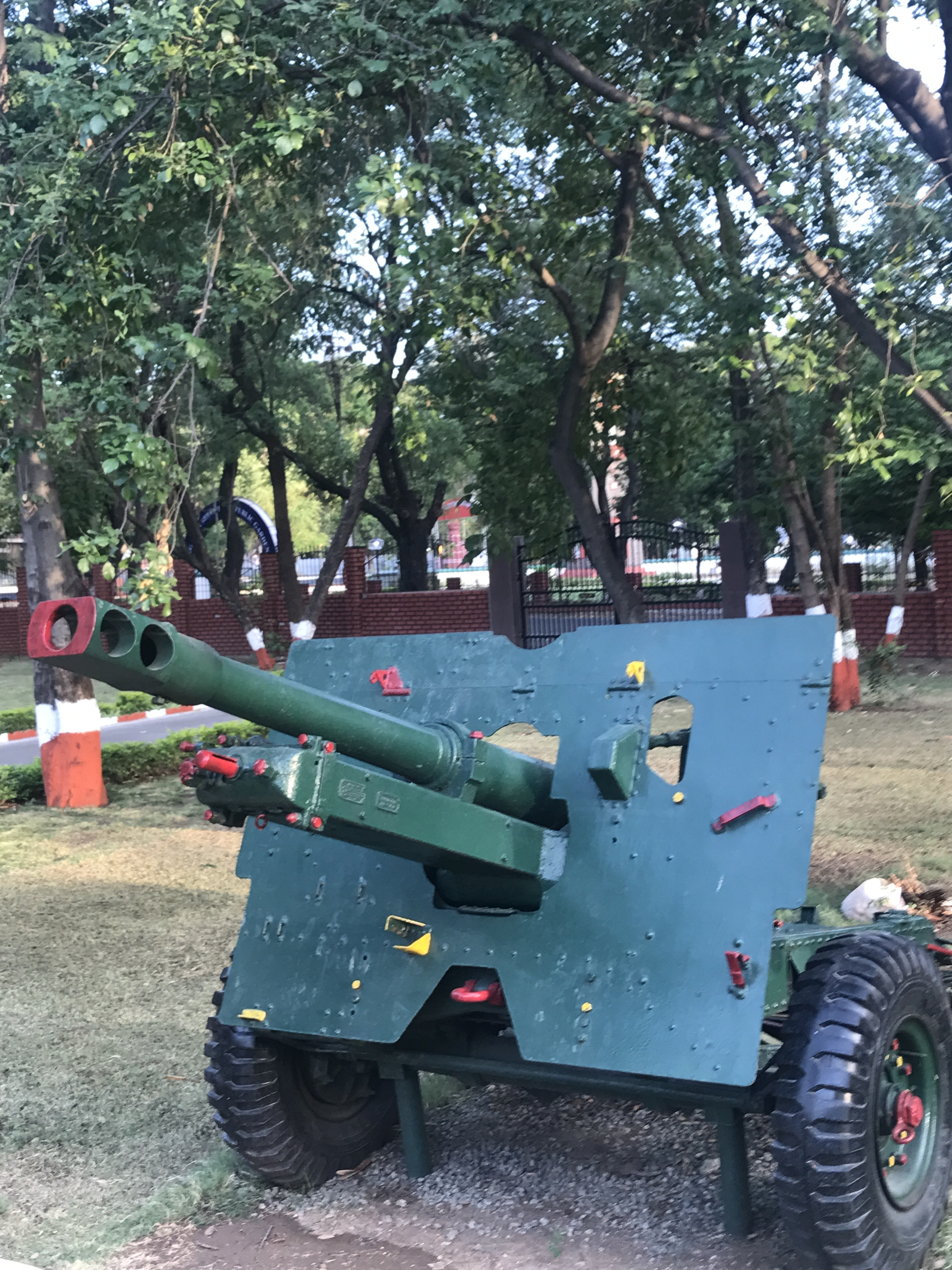
A 25 Pounder MK-II at a war museum in India

The standard design, also made in Canada as C Mk II barrel.

Mark II/I
In 1946, a programme was introduced to modify the gun's breech ring by morticing the rear corners. A corresponding modification was made to the rear corners of the breech block. This was to reduce the instances of cracking the ring.

Mark III barrel
The Mark III barrel was a Mark II with a modified receiver to prevent the rounds from slipping back out when loading at high angles. It was introduced in January 1944.

Mark III/I
This was a Mk III gun with the same modification to the ring and block as for the Mk II/I.

Mark IV barrel
The Mark IV was identical to the Mark III/I, and featured the modified ring and a paired block from new.

Mark VI barrel
The final alteration of the breech ring made in 1964.

=== Short, Mark I ===
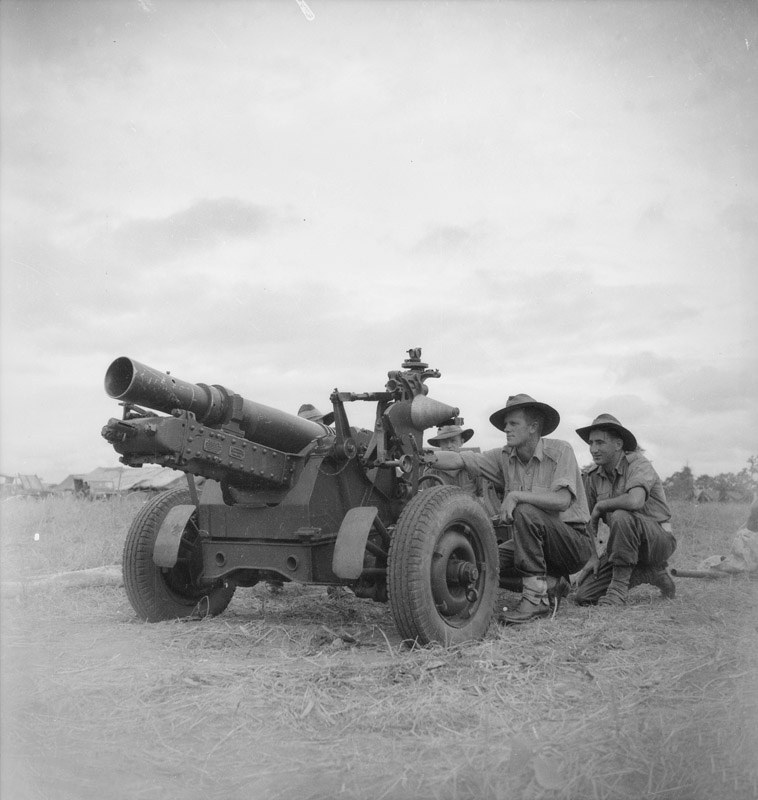
A Short 25-pounder in New Guinea in 1944

The 25-pounder Short Mark I, or Baby 25-pr, was an Australian pack gun version of the 25-pounder, first produced in 1943. This was a shortened version of the standard 25-pounder, mounted on the Carriage 25-pr Light, Mark 1. Weighing 1,315 kilograms (2,899 lb), it was around 315 kg (694 lb) lighter than the 25-pounder Mark II.

The "Baby" was intended for jungle warfare and was only used by Australian units in the South West Pacific theatre. The gun could be towed by a jeep or broken down into 13 sections and transported by air. During the New Guinea campaign, the gun was manhandled up steep jungle tracks where trucks could not operate.

=== Carriages ===
Mark I

The Mark I carriage was the first real 25-pounder carriage. Later in the war, some guns had a double spacer-separated shield to improve protection. It had Probert-pattern calibrating sights, but with the range indicator wrapped into the distinctive cone that rotated against a fixed reader arm.

Jury axle

In Burma, artificers of 129 (Lowland) Jungle Field Regiment developed a local modification to use a Jeep axle and wheels to produce a 20-inch narrower axle track for easier movement along restricted jungle paths, along with some minor modifications to the gun trail; it was called the Jury Axle. Tests in action showed the gun was stable, it was first reported to GHQ India in October 1943. It appears that it was also used without its shield, and the gun could be disassembled for transport in pieces by Jeep. 139th (4th London) Jungle Field Regiment used the modified guns and developed procedures for dismantling them for stowage aboard Douglas C-47 Dakota transport aircraft.

Mark II

The Mark II carriage was basically the War Office-approved formalisation of the Jury Axle version of the 25-pounder. Changes included a narrower shield, a new narrower track platform (No 22), and modified Jeep wheels.

Mark III

The Mark III carriage, also narrow, was a further development of the Mark II carriage to provide joints that enabled the trail to be cranked for "upper register" (high-angle) fire to avoid the need to dig a trail pit, and used with the cranked "dial sight adaptor" previously adopted for high-angle fire. It entered service soon after the war. High-angle fire had been introduced in Italy and used increments to charges 2 and 3 to give the 25-pounder seven charges.

Mark IV

The British did further work on the Australian-designed short 25-pounder, enabling it to fire charge Super. One or two prototypes were produced and the carriage was officially designated the Mark IV, but never went into production.

== Self-propelled 25-pounders ==
=== Bishop ===
The Bishop was a British self-propelled 25-pounder using the Valentine tank chassis, soon replaced by better designs.

=== Sexton ===
The Sexton was a Canadian self-propelled 25-pounder using the Ram or Grizzly tank chassis.

=== Yeramba ===
The Yeramba was an Australian self-propelled 25-pounder produced from 1949 by converting a number of Grant tanks in a similar style to the Sexton

== Operators ==
=== Current operators ===
- Australia
- Canada (also used in military funerals)
- Cyprus
- Egypt
- France: used by Free French and then in Indochina
- Greece
- India Now as ceremonial gun.
- Indonesia: 144 from Royal Netherlands East Indies Army (KNIL).
- Ireland (relegated to ceremonial role)
- Israel
- Jordan
- Kuwait
- Kurdistan -Peshmerga
- Lebanon
- Lesotho
- Luxembourg (relegated to ceremonial role)
- Malaysia (relegated to ceremomial role)
- Malta (relegated to ceremonial role)
- Morocco
- Mozambique: still in service in 2002
- Myanmar -50 in service
- New Zealand (relegated to ceremonial role)
- Nigeria
- Pakistan: Some units inherited from the British Indian Army with several more captured from retreating Indian forces during Operation Grand Slam in 1965.
- Paraguay: 12 from South Africa
- Poland (Polish Armed Forces in the West)
- Portugal: Registration – Obus 8,8 cm m/43 (relegated to ceremonial role)
- Qatar
- Singapore (relegated to ceremonial role)
- South Africa (relegated to ceremonial role)
- Sri Lanka (relegated to ceremonial role)
- Suriname: 3 displayed during parades in 2016
- United Arab Emirates
- United Kingdom
- Zimbabwe

=== Former operators ===
- Belgium: used by Belgian Field Battery during WWII; also in Belgian Congo post-WWII.
- Czechoslovakia: used during WWII.
- Fiji: Used for ceremonial purpose. Replaced by the KH178 in 2014.
- Kingdom of Italy: Captured examples and 1943–45 co-belligerent forces.
- Kingdom of Iraq
- Malaysia (retired in active military service)
- Nazi Germany: Captured examples Mk I designated 8.76 cm Feldkanone 280(e), MK II designated 8.76 cm Feldkanone 281(e).
- Netherlands: Used by Royal Netherlands Motorized Infantry Brigade "Princess Irene", Royal Netherlands East Indies Army (1945–1949), Marines Brigade (1945–1949), Royal Netherlands Army (1945–1984).
- Oman: ~40 in 1976
- Rhodesia: used during the Rhodesian Bush War.
- South Vietnam: 122 in 1953.
- United States: used during the Tunisian Campaign, Battle of the Bulge and Pacific War.

== See also ==
- British standard ordnance weights and measurements
