= John Deacon (disambiguation) =

John Deacon (born 1951) is the former bassist of the rock band Queen.

John Deacon may also refer to:

- John Deacon (motorcyclist) (1962–2001)
- John Deacon, former owner of English football club Portsmouth F.C.

== See also ==
- Deacon John (disambiguation)
- John the Deacon (disambiguation), several mediaeval writers
