= Deacon Jones (disambiguation) =

Deacon Jones (1938–2013) was an American football player.

Deacon Jones may also refer to:

- Deacon Jones (infielder) (1934–2023), American baseball infielder
- Deacon Jones (pitcher) (1892–1952), American baseball pitcher
- Deacon Jones (runner) (1934–2007), American Olympic steeplechase runner
- Melvyn "Deacon" Jones (1943–2017), American blues organist
