= Val Deakin =

New Zealand dancer, choreographer and teacher (1935–2025)

Val Deakin ONZM
- Born: 27 December 1935; New Plymouth, New Zealand
- Died: 25 May 2025 (aged 89); New Plymouth, New Zealand
- Education: Arts Educational Schools, Royal Ballet School
- Awards: New Zealand Suffrage Centennial Medal 1993, Officer of the New Zealand Order of Merit

Valerie Ann Deakin ONZM (27 December 1935 – 23 May 2025) was a New Zealand dancer, choreographer and dance teacher. Deakin danced, choreographed and taught in the UK, Turkey and the US before returning to New Zealand. She established a dance school and theatre trust in Taranaki, which celebrated their fiftieth anniversary in 2022. In 1993 Deakin was awarded a New Zealand Suffrage Centennial Medal. In 2024 she was appointed an Officer of the New Zealand Order of Merit for services to dance.

Deakin died at a care home in New Plymouth, on 25 May 2025, at the age of 89.

== Early life and education ==
Deakin was born in New Plymouth, and attended dance classes as a four year old in New Plymouth, and later moved to Wellington. She trained at the Arts Education Schools in London, and also gained a scholarship to attend the Royal Ballet School.

== International career ==
Deakin danced with the Royal Ballet and in Ankara in Turkey. An invitation to perform in the US led to Deakin setting up a dance company in Washington D.C. Deakin performed, taught and choreographed for the National Ballet in Washington, Maryland Ballet, and Manhattan Festival Ballet.

== New Zealand career ==
Returning to New Zealand in 1972, Deakin founded the a dance school, teaching ballet, jazz, tap and modern dance. The following year she established the Val Deakin Dance Theatre Trust, to present dance performances and conduct dance education across Taranaki and nationally. In 2023 the Val Deakin Dance Theatre Trust celebrated its fiftieth anniversary. Deakin retired as a teacher in 2022, aged 87.

== Honours and awards ==
In 1993 Deakin was awarded a New Zealand Suffrage Centennial Medal. The medals were awarded to people who had made a significant contribution to women's rights or women's issues in New Zealand. Deakin had written a ballet, Steps in Time, which celebrated the centennial of women's suffrage, and dance pioneers. In 2018 she wrote Just in Time for the 125th anniversary of women's suffrage, using parts of Steps in Time, and covering both suffrage and the impacts of World War II on New Zealand women.

In the 2024 New Year Honours Deakin was appointed an Officer of the New Zealand Order of Merit for services to dance.
