= Deacon (given name) =

- Gender: Male
- Language: Greek, English

Origin
- Meaning: messenger; servant

Deacon is a male given name of Greek and English origin which means "messenger" or "servant". Notable people with the name include:

- Deacon Chiu (1924–2015), Hong Kong entrepreneur
- Deacon Hill (American football) (born 2003), American college football quarterback
- Deacon Manu (born 1979), New Zealand-born Fijian rugby union footballer
