= John the Deacon of the Lateran =

Deacon of the Lateran (12th century)

John, known as canon of the Lateran or deacon of the Lateran (fl. 12th century), was a medieval Roman deacon, canon and religious chronicler. John lived in the second half of the 12th century, and served as a deacon and canon of the Basilica of St. John Lateran. He compiled a work on this papal basilica, and dedicated it, in the preface, to Pope Alexander III (c. 1100/1105 – 1181), thereby indicating the date of its composition. It was obviously a secondary object of the author in composing this work to support the canons of the Lateran in their dispute for precedence with the canons of St. Peter's Basilica.
