= Deakins =

Deakins is a surname, and may refer to:

- James Deakins, fictional character on Law & Order: Criminal Intent
- Joanne Deakins (born 1972), British backstroke swimmer
- Lucy Deakins (born 1971), American actress
- Peter Deakins, British architect
- Roger Deakins (born 1949), British cinematographer

== See also ==
- Deakin (surname)
