= Deacon John Buffington House =

Historic house in Massachusetts, United States

- U.S. National Register of Historic Places
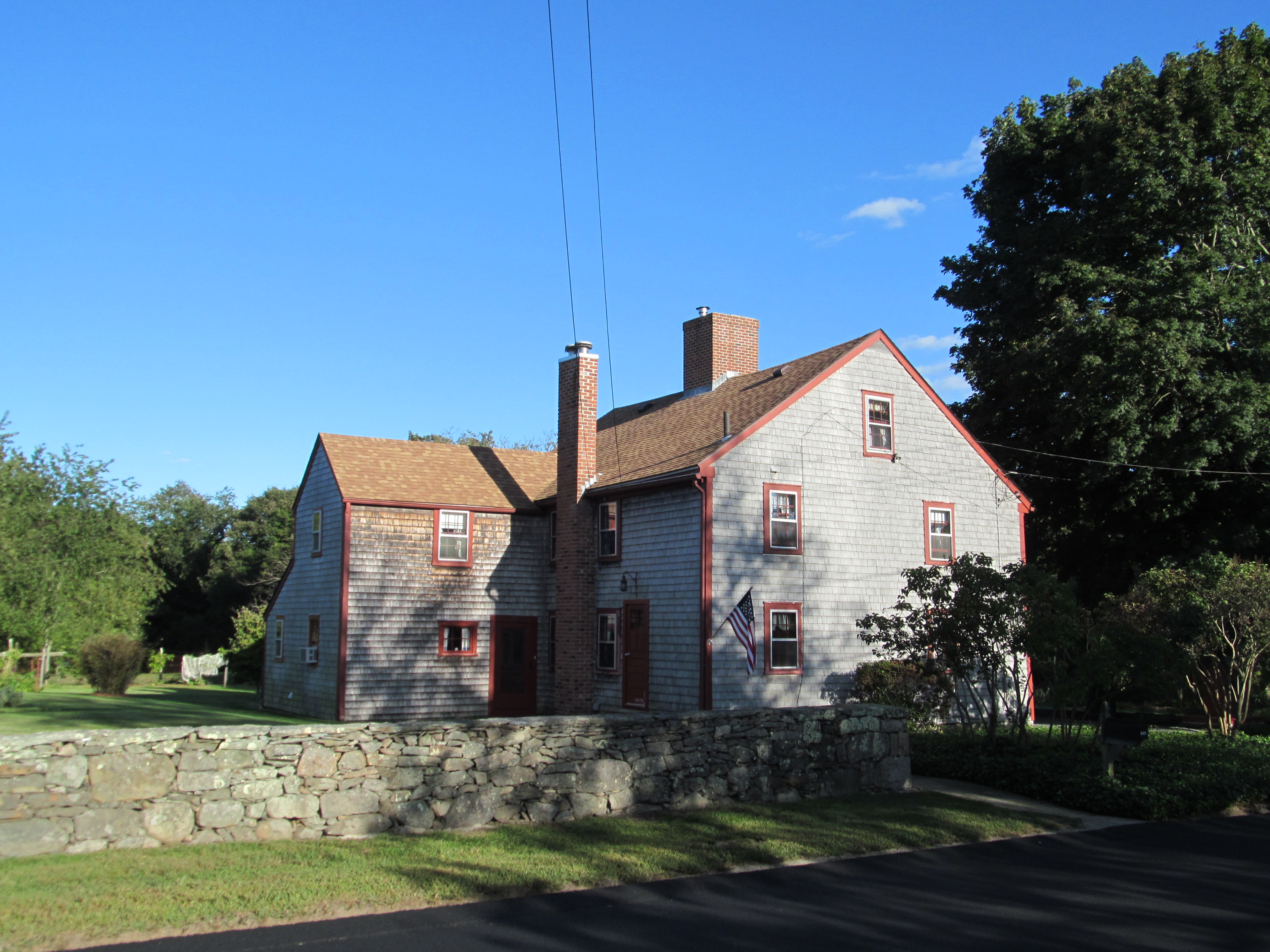
- Deacon John Buffington House

- Location within Massachusetts Location within the United States
- Location: 262 Cedar Avenue, Swansea, Massachusetts
- Coordinates: 41°44′25″N 71°13′5″W
- Area: 1 acre (0.40 ha)
- Built: 1790
- Architectural style: Georgian
- MPS: Swansea MRA
- NRHP reference No.: 90000056
- Added to NRHP: February 16, 1990

The Deacon John Buffington House is a historic house in Swansea, Massachusetts. It is a 2 1/2-story wood-frame structure, four bays wide, with a side-gable roof, and its chimney centered behind one of the inner bays, behind the main entrance. Exterior styling is simple, with plain boards around the door, and only minor embellishment on the window framing. A two-story ell extends to the rear. The house was probably built c. 1790. Its first documented owner was John Buffington, a member of the locally prominent Buffington family. The house exhibits well-preserved but simple vernacular Georgian styling.

The house was listed on the National Register of Historic Places in 1990.

== See also ==
- National Register of Historic Places listings in Bristol County, Massachusetts
