= Abbot (artillery) =

FV433 105mm Field Artillery, Self-Propelled Abbot
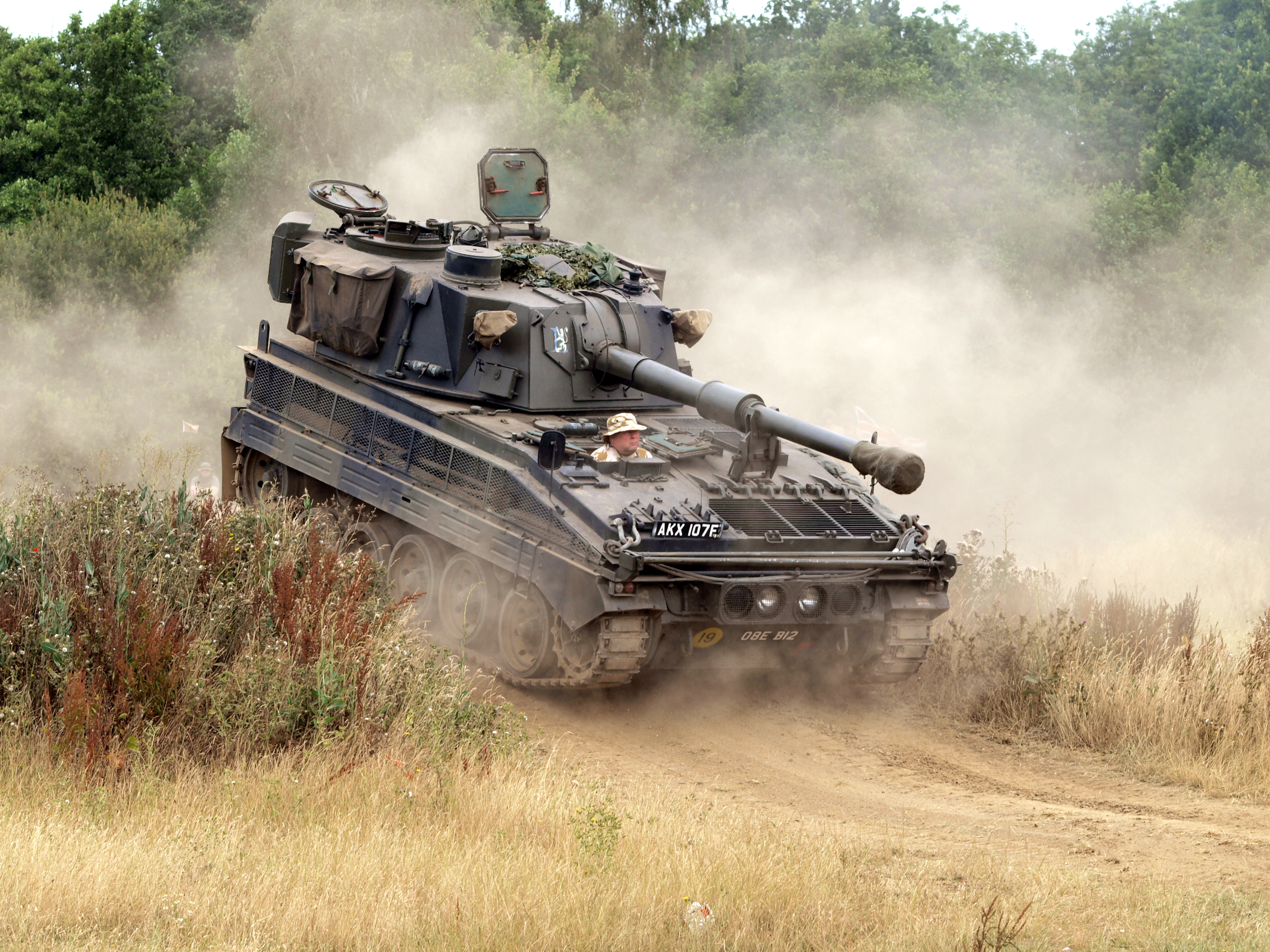
- An Abbot at the War and Peace Show, 2010
- Type: Self-propelled artillery
- Place of origin: United Kingdom

Service history
- In service: 1965–2016
- Used by: British Army; Indian Army

Production history
- Manufacturer: Vickers
- No. built: 234

Specifications
- Mass: 16.56 t (16.30 long tons; 18.25 short tons) (loaded without crew)
- Length: (gun forward) 5.8 m (20 ft)
- Width: 2.6 m (8 ft 6 in)
- Height: 2.5 m (8 ft 2 in)
- Crew: Detachment of 6: No. 1: Commander; No. 2: Ammunition loader & radio operator; No. 3: Gun layer; No. 4: Driver & ammunition handler; No. 5: Ammunition handler; No. 6: Second in command, and responsible for ammunition preparation.; No. 1–4 were turret crew and No. 5–6 travelled in the accompanying ammunition vehicle.
- Armour: 10 and 12 mm (0.39 and 0.47 in) plate
- Main armament: 105 mm L13A1 gun, 40 rounds (including 6 rounds HESH) carried
- Secondary armament: 7.62 mm L4A4 machine gun with 1,200 rounds; smoke dischargers
- Engine: Rolls-Royce K60 Mk 4G multi-fuel opposed-piston engine 240 bhp (180 kW) @ 3750 rpm
- Power/weight: 14.5bhp/tonne (10.8 kW/tonne)
- Suspension: torsion bar: 5 units per side
- Operational range: 480 km (300 mi)
- Maximum speed: 47 km/h (29 mph)

FV433, 105mm, Field Artillery, Self-Propelled "Abbot" is the self-propelled artillery, or more specifically self-propelled gun (SPG), variant of the British Army FV430 series of armoured fighting vehicles (AFVs), using much of the chassis of the FV430 but with a fully rotating turret at the rear housing the 105 mm gun and given the vehicle designation of FV433.

Designed as a Sexton replacement, its correct designation was "Gun Equipment 105mm L109 (Abbot)". "L109" was little used, probably to avoid confusion with the 155 mm M109 howitzer that entered UK service at about the same time. The name "Abbot" continued the Second World War style of naming self-propelled artillery after ecclesiastical titles. The FV433 used a different configuration of power pack from other vehicles in the FV430 series.

== Development ==
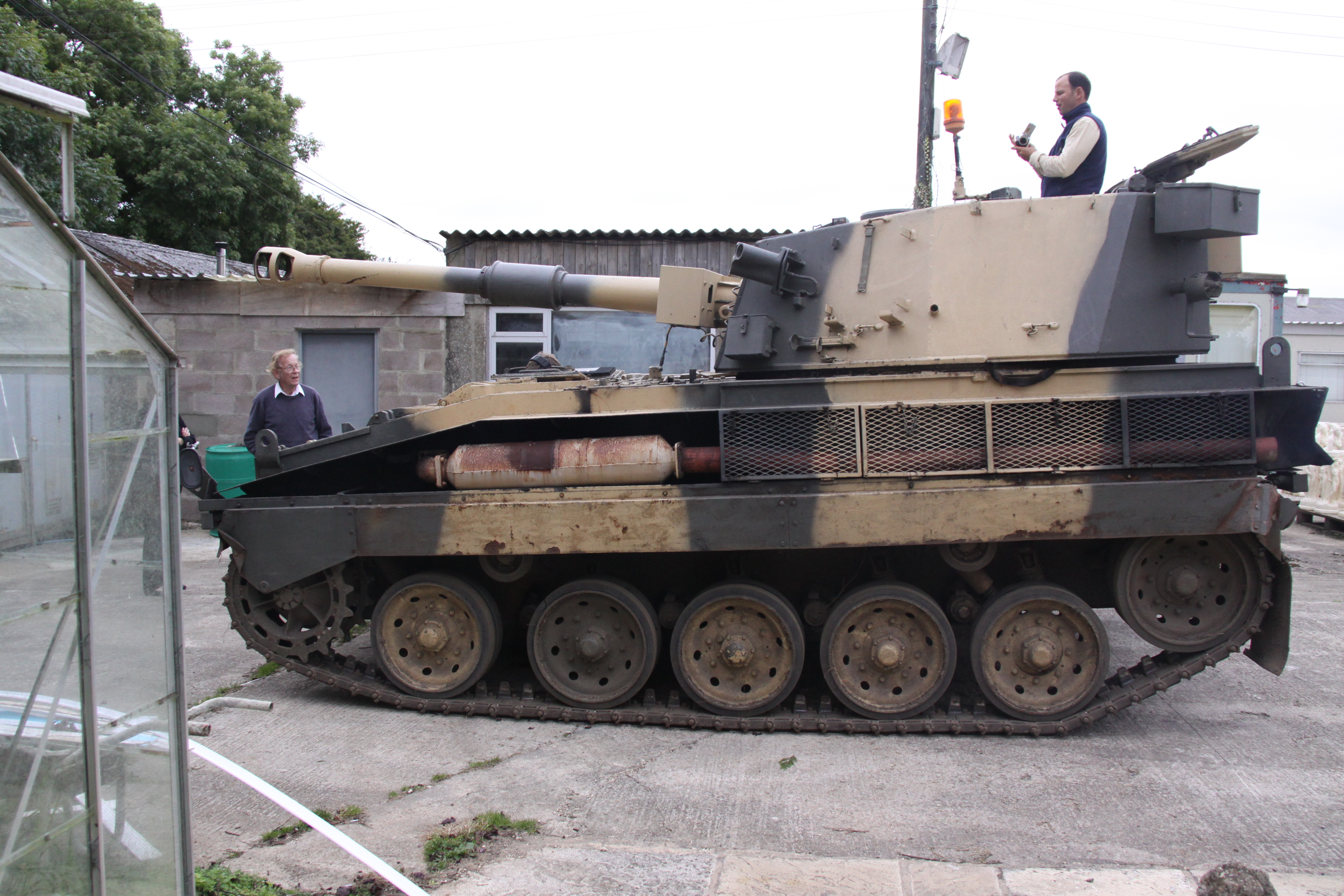

=== Ammunition ===
A completely new ammunition family, comprising shells, fuzes and cartridges, was designed for Abbot's L13 gun, designated "105 mm Field" ("105 mm Fd"). It is separate loading cased charge ammunition (shell and cartridge loaded into the gun separately) with electrical primers, in contrast to the widely used semi-fixed US 105 mm M1 type ammunition (called "105 mm How" in UK service), which uses percussion primers, and has shorter shells.

There were two versions of 105 mm Fd ammunition. Mark 1, which was used initially, had a UK-produced 105 mm How shell, mostly US pattern fuzes and reduced charge 105 mm Fd cartridges with their electrical primers. Mark 2 adopted a new projectile design, including an improved lethality high-explosive (HE) shell (heavier with more HE) and full charge cartridges. Its shell types include HE, Smoke, Coloured Marker (Red and Orange), Illuminating, and HESH for direct fire against enemy armoured vehicles. Direct Action, Controlled Variable Time (CVT) and Mechanical Time (MT) fuzes were available for HE and Coloured Marker shells.

Initially, there were three cartridges. Sub-zones 1 and 2 were only used to provide short-range in high angle fire and were soon replaced by a plastic spoiler slipped over the shell ogive. Normal cartridge gave charges 1–5, each bag being a different colour in accordance with established UK practice, Mark 1 normal cartridge only went to charge 4. Both marks had charge Super, a single charge cartridge, although the charge was reduced in Mark 1. Charges 5 and Super used extended "bags" that projected beyond the metal cartridge case. The 105 mm Fd uses double (often internationally called triple) base propellants designated N in UK service instead of the single based FNH propellants favoured by the US.

The 105 mm Fd Mark 2 is still used with the L118 Light Gun.

=== Gun ===
Maximum range with 105 mm Fd Mark 1 ammunition was 15 km, the Mark 2 gave 17.4 km. Maximum rate of fire was 6–8 rounds per minute with 40 rounds carried in the vehicle.

The gun was able to elevate to 70 degrees and depress to -5 degrees, sufficient to engage enemy AFVs if necessary. Traverse and shell ramming were powered by electrical servo mechanisms, elevation and cartridge ramming were by hand.

Due to the number of charges and its compact turret, the Abbot did not have calibrating sights. Instead, the sight mount had both Tangent Elevation (TE) and Angle of Sight Scales with a separate Gun Rule to convert range into TE, corrected for the muzzle velocity variation from standard. The dial sight had all scales internal, illuminated and viewed through a single eyepiece.

=== Communications ===
The Abbot was fitted with both line and radio Larkspur B48, then Clansman UK/PRC 352) communications to its battery command post, which used the Apparatus Loud Speaking No. 23, this enabled the gun No. 1 to acknowledge his fire orders merely by clicking his pressel switch. Initially, it also used induction loop communications for the turret and external crew.

Shortly after the Field Artillery Computer Equipment (FACE) entered service in the early 1970s, the Gun Rule was removed and the Artillery Weapon Data Transmission System (AWDATS) installed. AWDATS displayed firing data transmitted from FACE in the battery command post via line or radio.

=== Mobility ===
The Abbot was able to swim across water, using a flotation screen fixed around the hull, raised to provide buoyancy. The action of the tracks was sufficient to drive it forward at about 3 knots (5.6 km/h) (see also DD Tank). Each Abbot was supported by an amphibious Stalwart High Mobility Load Carrier with additional ammunition.

== Service history ==
British Army Abbots were replaced by the AS-90 self-propelled gun in the mid-1990s. It was in service with the Indian Army, now replaced by the K9 Thunder self-propelled howitzer. No sources refer to Abbots ever being used in combat.

== Variants ==
A simplified Value Engineered Abbot without flotation screen, NBC defence equipment, power traverse, elevation or loading, a simplified dial sight and communications fit was exported to India. A small number were purchased by the UK for use at the British Army Training Unit Suffield (BATUS) in Alberta, Canada.

A SPAAG version using an unmodified chassis with an alternate turret mounting two 30 millimetres (1.2 in) HSS 831L cannons was prototyped as the "Falcon" but limited ammunition capacity of only 310 rounds per gun led to its cancellation.

The Abbot's L13 105mm gun has been reproduced as a towed howitzer on a new carriage for the Indian Army.

== Ammunition ==
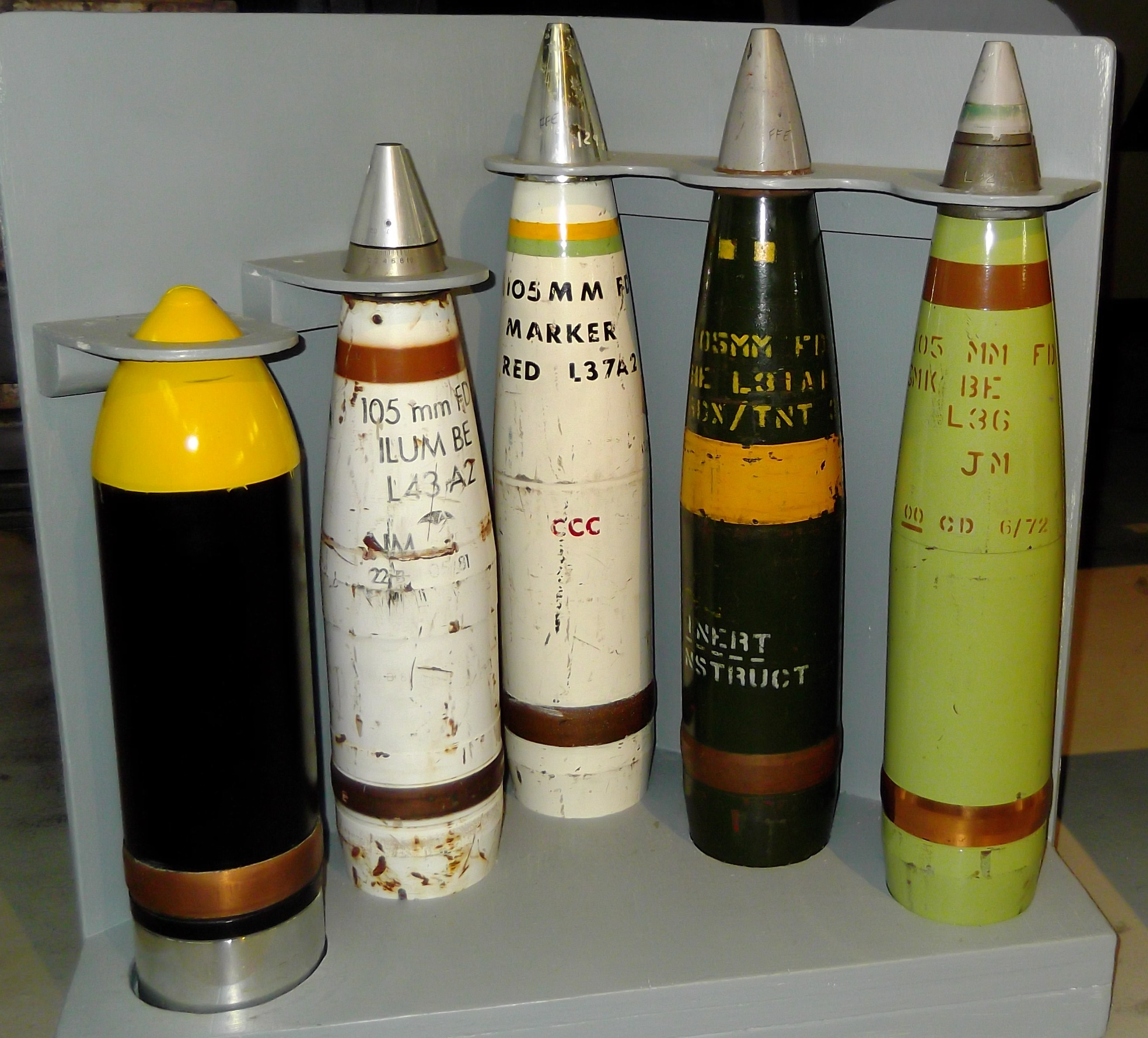
HESH, L43A2, L37A2, L31A1, L36

105mm Field Mark 1

- L32 Cartridge 105mm Field, Normal (Charges 1–4)
- L34 Cartridge 105mm Field, (Charge Super)
- L33 Shell 105mm Howitzer, HE
- L32 Shell 105mm Howitzer, WP
- L51 Shell 105mm Howitzer, Smoke
- L55 Shell 105mm Howitzer, Illuminating
- L43 Shell 105mm Howitzer, HESH
- L44 Shell 105mm Howitzer, Practice

105mm Field Mark 2

- L35 Cartridge 105mm Field, Normal (Charges 1–5)
- L36 Cartridge 105mm Field, Super
- L31 Shell 105mm Field, HE
- L36 Shell 105mm Field, Smoke
- L37 Shell 105mm Field, Marker, Red
- L38 Shell 105mm Field, Marker, Orange
- L43 Shell 105mm Field, Illuminating
- L42 Shell 105mm Field, HESH
- L41 Shell 105mm Field, Practice

== Operators ==
- India: Indian Army, 80 were operational in Regiment of Artillery (including 68 Value Engineered Abbots received in the 1960s). Replaced by K9 Vajra T.
- United Kingdom: British Army, 146 received for use by Royal Artillery regiments (1965–1995)

== See also ==
- List of armoured fighting vehicles
- List of artillery by country
- M108 Howitzer – (United States)
