= Deacon (surname) =

Deacon is a surname relating to the occupation of deacon. It may refer to:

- Adam Deacon (born 1983), English actor
- Amos Deacon (1904–1982), American field hockey player
- Antony King-Deacon (1941–2005), British journalist and author
- Belle Deacon (1904–1995), American Alaskan basketmaker and language and folklore expert
- Bernard Deacon (anthropologist) (1903–1927), social anthropologist on the islands of Vanuatu
- Bernard Deacon (linguist), British academic
- Bert Deacon (1922–1974), Australian rules footballer
- Bill Deacon (1944–2019), New Zealand rugby league footballer
- Bob Deacon (died 2017), British social policy academic
- Brett Deacon (born 1982), English rugby union footballer and coach
- Brian Deacon (born 1949), British actor
- Bruce Deacon (born 1966), Canadian long-distance runner
- Charlie Deacon (1869–1893), English footballer
- Clare Deacon (1891–1952), Australian nurse
- Cliff Deacon (born 1935), Australian rules footballer
- Colin Deacon (born 1959), Canadian entrepreneur and politician
- Dan Deacon (born 1981), American musician and composer
- Dave Deacon (1929–1990), English footballer
- Desley Deacon (born 1941), Australian sociologist, historian and biographer
- Destiny Deacon (1957–2024), Australian photographer
- Dickie Deacon (1911–1986), Scottish footballer
- Don Deacon (1912–1943), Canadian ice hockey player
- Donald Deacon (1920–2003), Canadian politician and businessman
- Edward Parker Deacon (1844–1901), American crime of passion killer
- Elsie Louisa Deacon (1897–1984), British engineer
- Eric Deacon (born 1950), English actor and writer
- Fern Deacon, English actress
- Frances Elizabeth Deacon (1837–1930), English chemist and druggist
- Frederick Deacon (1829–1875), British chess master
- George Deacon (1906–1984), British oceanographer and chemist
- George Deacon (civil engineer) (1843–1909), English civil engineer
- Giles Deacon (born 1969), British fashion designer
- Gill Deacon (born 1966), Canadian author and broadcaster
- Harry Deacon (1900–1946), English footballer
- Henry Deacon (cricketer) (1809–1854), English cricketer and umpire
- Henry Deacon (industrialist) (1822–1876), British chemist and industrialist
- Hilary Deacon (1936–2010), South African archaeologist
- James Deacon (artist) (died 1750), English miniature painter
- Janette Deacon (born 1939), South African archaeologist
- Jared Deacon (born 1975), British sprint athlete
- Jeamie Deacon (born 1987), Irish rugby union footballer
- Jimmy Deacon (1906–1976), Scottish footballer
- Joey Deacon (1920–1981), British author and disability advocate
- John Deacon (born 1951), British bassist for the rock band Queen
- John Deacon (motorcyclist) (1962–2001), British motorcycle enduro racer
- Katy Deacon, British engineer and accessibility advocate
- Louis Deacon (born 1980), English rugby union footballer
- Marty Deacon (born 1958), Canadian educator and politician
- Maxwell Deacon (1910–1970), Canadian ice hockey player
- Michael Deacon (actor) (1933–2000), Scottish actor
- Michael Deacon (bishop) (died 1500), bishop of St Asaph
- Michael Deacon (journalist) (born 1980), British journalist
- Paul Deacon (born 1979), English rugby league footballer and coach
- Pudentiana Deacon (c.1580–1645), English Benedictine nun
- Richard Deacon (actor) (1921–1984), American actor
- Richard Deacon (sculptor) (born 1949), British sculptor
- Roarie Deacon (born 1991), English footballer
- Robin Deacon (born 1973), English artist, writer and filmmaker
- Rowan Deacon (born 1976/7), English filmmaker
- Russell Deacon, Welsh historian and author
- Sharon Deacon (born 1957), Australian basketball player
- Simon Deacon (born 1954), Australian rules footballer
- Steve Deacon (born 1967), Australian rugby league footballer
- Susan Deacon (born 1964), Scottish business executive and politician
- Terrence Deacon (born 1950), American anthropologist
- Thomas Deacon (1697–1753), English non-juror, liturgical scholar and physician
- Thomas Deacon (politician) (1832–1911), Canadian politician from Ontario
- Thomas Russ Deacon (1865–1955), Canadian politician
- Tom Deacon (comedian) (born 1986), English comedian and broadcaster
- Tom Deacon (rugby union) (1868–1921), Wales rugby union footballer
- Vera Deacon (1926–2021), Australian historian, writer and philanthropist
- Vern Deacon (1908–1965), Australian rugby league footballer
- William Deacon (cricketer) (1828–1903), English cricketer and banker
- William Deacon (politician) (1872–1943), farmer and member of the Queensland Legislative Assembly
- William Arthur Deacon (1890–1977), Canadian literary critic and editor
- William Frederick Deacon (1799–1845), English author and journalist

== See also ==
- Deakin (surname)
