= James Deacon =

James Deacon may refer to:

- Jimmy Deacon (1906–1976), Scottish footballer
- James the Deacon, Italian deacon who accompanied Paulinus of York on his mission to Northumbria
- James Deacon (artist) (died 1750), English miniature painter
