= Carl Gustav Klingstedt =

Swedish painter

Carl Gustav Klingstedt (26 February 1657 Riga - 17 February 1734 Paris) was a Swedish miniature painter.

== Biography ==
He entered in 1672 in the Swedish army and later he became a French soldier. In 1689 he left to dedicate himself to art. First he was appointed draftsman of Maximilian II Emanuel, Elector of Bavaria and worked also for Philippe I, Duke of Orleans (1640 - 1701) and received a pension from the cardinal minister Guillaume Dubois (1656 - 1723) in France, where he was given the French form of his name: Clinchelet (or Clinchetet and Clingetel). He developed a fruitful activity as miniaturist and painted mainly gallant, often quite free scenes for tobacco boxes. The artist enjoyed great popularity and received the nickname "Le Raphael des Tabatiers" for perfection in execution and refinement in details. Maria Karolina Sobieska, Duchess of Bouillon (1697 - 1740), owned a portrait by Clinchetet and Voltaire (1694 - 1778) wrote the following sonnet to celebrate her beauty and the great skill of Klingstedt: “Cesse, Bouillon, de vanter davantage Ce Clinchetet qui peignit tes attraits: Un meilleur peintre, avec de plus beaux traits, Dans tous nos cœurs a tracé ton image, et cependant tu n’en parles jamais." In life he was a very famous and imitated artist and the knight Louis de Jaucourt (1704 - 1779) wrote an article about him on l’Encyclopedie. A portrait of Klingstedt was painted in 1712 by Jean Marc Nattier (1685 - 1766) who was employed, later, in 1717 by Klingstedt and Charles Boit (1662 - 1727) a swedish miniaturist in enamels. Works by Klingstedt are in the most important museums in the world: Louvre, Met, Wallace Collection, British Museum, Tansey Foundation and many others. His only daughter married M. de Bernieres (died 1784), one of the four "Ingénieurs des ponts et chaussées" in Paris, member of Royal Academy of Metz, Caen, Angers and Rouen and inventor of "bateaux insubmergibles".

== Artwork ==
Klingstedt's miniatures are rarely signed and dated, mainly painted on vellum in ink of China, but there are known some made in the technique of enamel painting on copper or watercolor on ivory. His works are mostly executed in a type of grisaille restricted to a spectrum of grey tones, giving the figures a special depth similar to a sculpture. He used individual coloured accents to draw attention to special details. His main subjects were gallant, biblical, epic, historical and genre scenes often in an erotic atmosphere. Sometimes he made some copies in miniature of paintings of other artists as Antoine Watteau, François Boucher or Italian renaissance painters and others.

== Works ==
- "Love and Psyche", c 1715, Indian ink and watercolour on parchment, Nationalmuseum of Sweden.
- "The three Graces", Indian ink and watercolour on parchment, Nationalmuseum of Sweden
- "Portrait of Christine Antoinette Charlotte Desmares" (1652 - 1753), Indian ink and watercolour on parchment, Nationalmuseum of Sweden
- "A satyr, a mean and two faunas, busy pulling out a stick", Indian ink and watercolour on parchment, Nationalmuseum of Sweden
- "Snuff box", c. 1725, Indian ink and watercolour on parchment, Cleveland museum of art.
- "Snuff box", c. 1720, Indian ink and watercolour on parchment, Hermitage Museum.
- "Lady with a Moorish boy", c. 1710, Indian ink and watercolour on parchment. The Tansey miniature foundation.
- "Troupe of travelling players", c. 1720, Indian ink and watercolour on parchment. The Tansey miniature foundation.
- "Lady with Cupid", c. 1710, Indian ink and watercolour on parchment. The Tansey miniature foundation.
- "Love Scene" c. 1720, Indian ink and watercolour on parchment. The Tansey miniature foundation.
- "Two young naked women in a bathtub", Indian ink and watercolour on parchment. Louvre Museum.
- "Leda and swan", Indian ink and watercolour on parchment. Louvre Museum.
- "Young girl playing the harpsichord, facing a young man", Indian ink and watercolour on parchment. Louvre Museum.
- "Instruction of a father to his family", gouache on parchment, signed and dated 1720, 21,5 x 30 cm.
- "Susanna and the elders" Indian ink and watercolour on parchment
