= Richard Deacon =

Dickie or Richard Deacon may refer to:

- Dickie Deacon (1911–1986), Scottish footballer and trainer
- Richard Deacon (writer) (1911–1998), pen name of British journalist and historian Donald McCormick
- Richard Deacon (actor) (1921–1984), American member of The Dick Van Dyke Show cast
- Richard Deacon (sculptor) (born 1949), Welsh winner of Turner Prize

== Characters ==
- Richard Deacon, American criminal in 1976 Marvel Comics transformed into supervillain Human Fly
