= Anne, Queen of Great Britain =

Queen of Great Britain and Ireland from 1702 to 1714

Anne
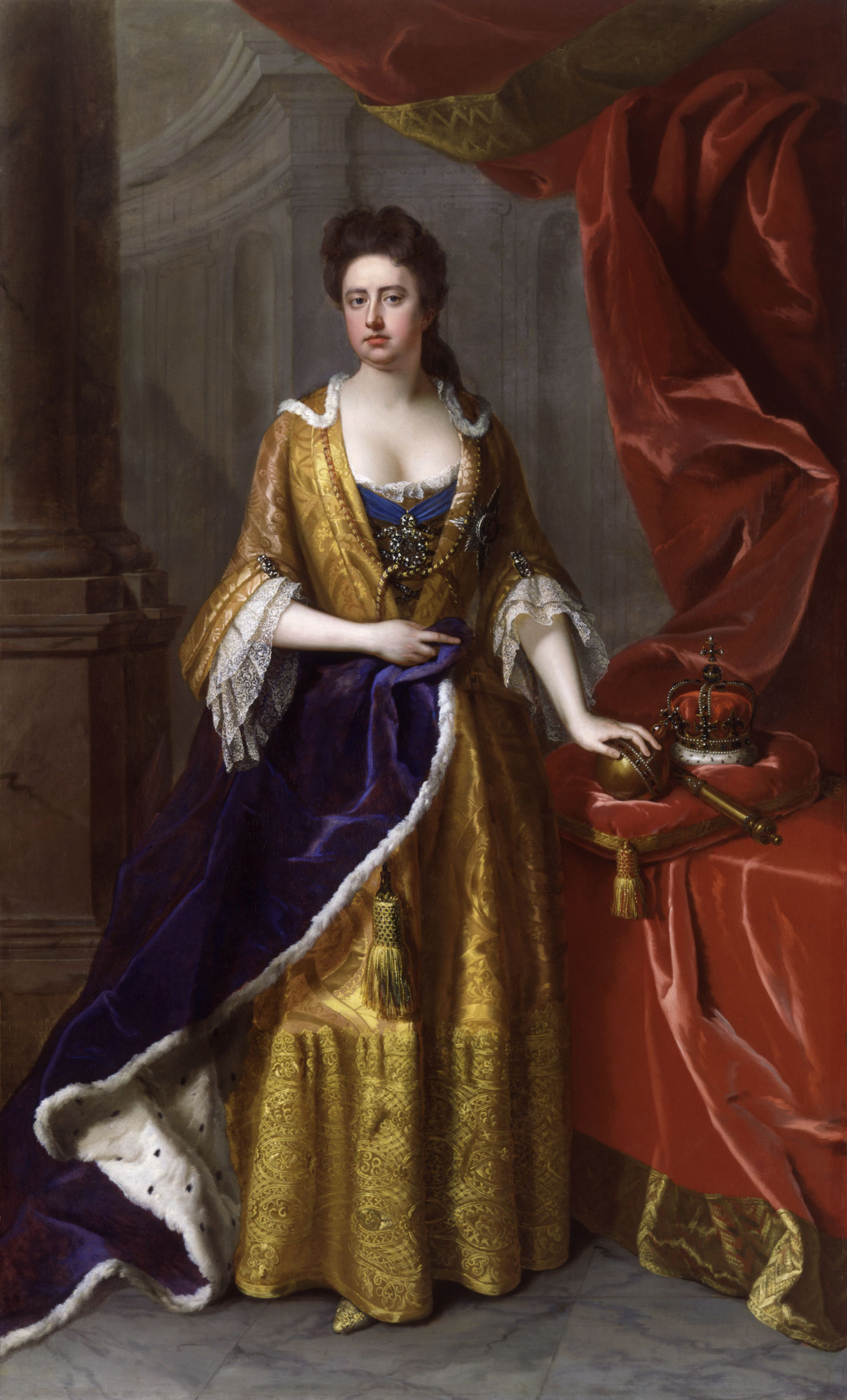
- Portrait, 1705

Queen of England, Scotland, and Ireland
- Reign: 8 March 1702 – 1 May 1707
- Coronation: 23 April 1702
- Predecessor: William III & II

Queen of Great Britain and Ireland
- Reign: 1 May 1707 – 1 August 1714
- Successor: George I
- Born: 6 February 1665; St James's Palace, Westminster, England
- Died: 1 August 1714 (aged 49); Kensington Palace, London, England
- Burial: 24 August 1714; Westminster Abbey
- Spouse: Prince George of Denmark (m. 1683; died 1708)
- Issue more...: Prince William, Duke of Gloucester
- House: Stuart
- Father: James II of England
- Mother: Anne Hyde
- Religion: Anglicanism

Anne (6 February 1665 – 1 August 1714) (Note: All dates in this article are in the Old Style Julian calendar used in Great Britain throughout Anne's lifetime, except that years are assumed to start on 1 January rather than 25 March, which was the English New Year.) was Queen of England, Scotland, and Ireland from 8 March 1702, and Queen of Great Britain and Ireland following the ratification of the Acts of Union 1707 merging the kingdoms of England and Scotland, until her death in 1714.

Anne was born during the reign of her uncle King Charles II. Her father was Charles's younger brother and heir presumptive, James, whose suspected Roman Catholicism was unpopular in England. On Charles's instructions, Anne and her elder sister Mary were raised as Anglicans. Mary married her Dutch Protestant cousin, William III of Orange, in 1677, and Anne married Prince George of Denmark, a Lutheran, in 1683. On Charles's death in 1685, James succeeded to the throne, but three years later he was deposed in the Glorious Revolution of 1688. Mary and William became joint monarchs. Although the sisters had been close, disagreements over Anne's finances, status, and choice of acquaintances arose shortly after Mary's accession and they became estranged. William and Mary had no children. After Mary's death in 1694, William reigned alone until his own death in 1702, when Anne succeeded him.

During her reign, Anne favoured moderate Tory politicians, who were more likely to share her Anglican religious views than their opponents, the Whigs. The Whigs grew more powerful during the course of the War of the Spanish Succession, until 1710 when Anne dismissed many of them from office. Her close friendship with Sarah Churchill, Duchess of Marlborough, turned sour as the result of political differences. The Duchess took revenge with an unflattering description of the Queen in her memoirs, which was widely accepted by historians until Anne was reassessed in the late 20th century.

Anne was plagued by poor health throughout her life, and from her thirties she grew increasingly ill and obese. Despite 17 pregnancies, she died without surviving issue, and was the last monarch of the House of Stuart. The death of her young son, Prince William, precipitated a potential succession crisis. Under the Act of Settlement 1701, which excluded all Catholics from the succession, Anne was succeeded by her second cousin George I, of the German House of Hanover.

== Early life ==
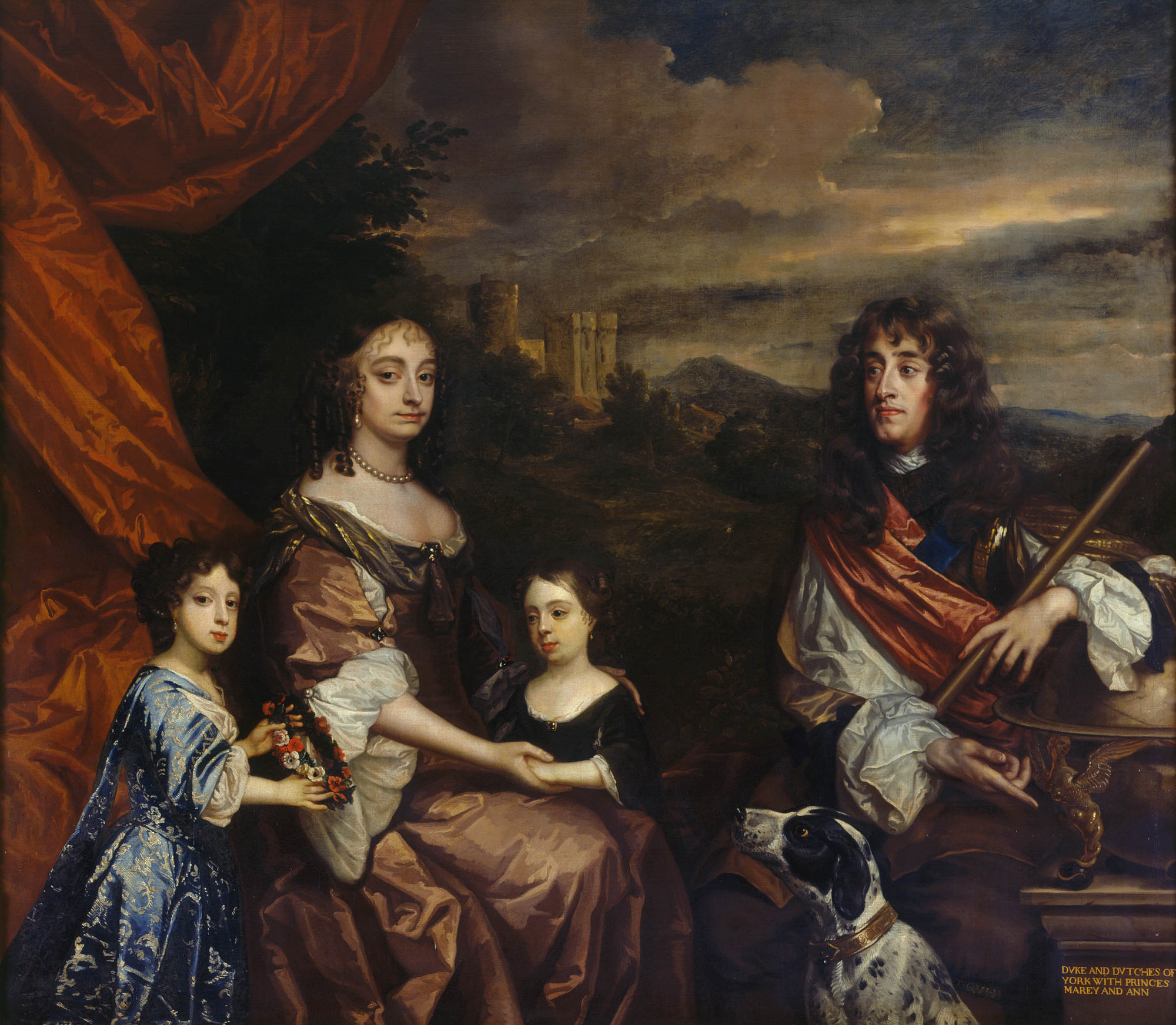
Anne (centre) and her sister Mary (left) with their parents, the Duke and Duchess of York, painted by Peter Lely and Benedetto Gennari II

Anne was born at 11:39 pm on 6 February 1665 at St James's Palace, London, the fourth child and second daughter of the Duke of York and Albany (later King James II and VII), and his first wife, Anne Hyde. Her father was the younger brother of King Charles II, who ruled the three kingdoms of England, Scotland and Ireland, and her mother was the daughter of Lord Chancellor Edward Hyde, 1st Earl of Clarendon. At her Anglican baptism in the Chapel Royal at St James's, her elder sister, Mary, was one of her godparents, along with the Duchess of Monmouth and the Archbishop of Canterbury, Gilbert Sheldon. Anne's parents had eight children, but Anne and Mary were the only ones to survive to adulthood.

As a child, Anne had an eye condition, which manifested as excessive watering known as "defluxion". For medical treatment, she was sent to France, where she lived with her paternal grandmother, Henrietta Maria of France, at the Château de Colombes near Paris. Following her grandmother's death in 1669, Anne lived with an aunt, Henrietta Anne, Duchess of Orléans. On the sudden death of her aunt in 1670, Anne returned to England. Her mother died the following year.

As was traditional in the royal family, Anne and her sister were brought up separated from their father in their own establishment at Richmond in Surrey. On the instructions of Charles II, they were raised as Protestants, despite their father being a Catholic. Placed in the care of Colonel Edward and Lady Frances Villiers, their education was focused on the teachings of the Anglican church. Henry Compton, Bishop of London, was appointed as Anne's preceptor. Her upbringing and education was typical for an aristocratic girl of her era, focusing on music, dancing, languages, drawing, and religion.

Around 1671, Anne first made the acquaintance of Sarah Jennings, who later became her close friend and one of her most influential advisors. In about 1678, Jennings married John Churchill (the future Duke of Marlborough), who was the brother of Arabella Churchill, the Duke of York's mistress. He was to become Anne's most important general.

In 1673, James's conversion to Catholicism became public, and he married a Catholic princess, Mary of Modena, who was only six and a half years older than Anne. Charles II had no legitimate children, and so James was next in the line of succession, followed by his two surviving daughters from his first marriage, Mary and Anne—as long as he had no son. Over the next ten years, Mary of Modena had ten children, but all were either stillborn or died in infancy, leaving Mary and Anne second and third in the line of succession after their father. There is every indication that, throughout Anne's early life, she and her stepmother got on well together, and James was a conscientious and loving father.

== Marriage ==
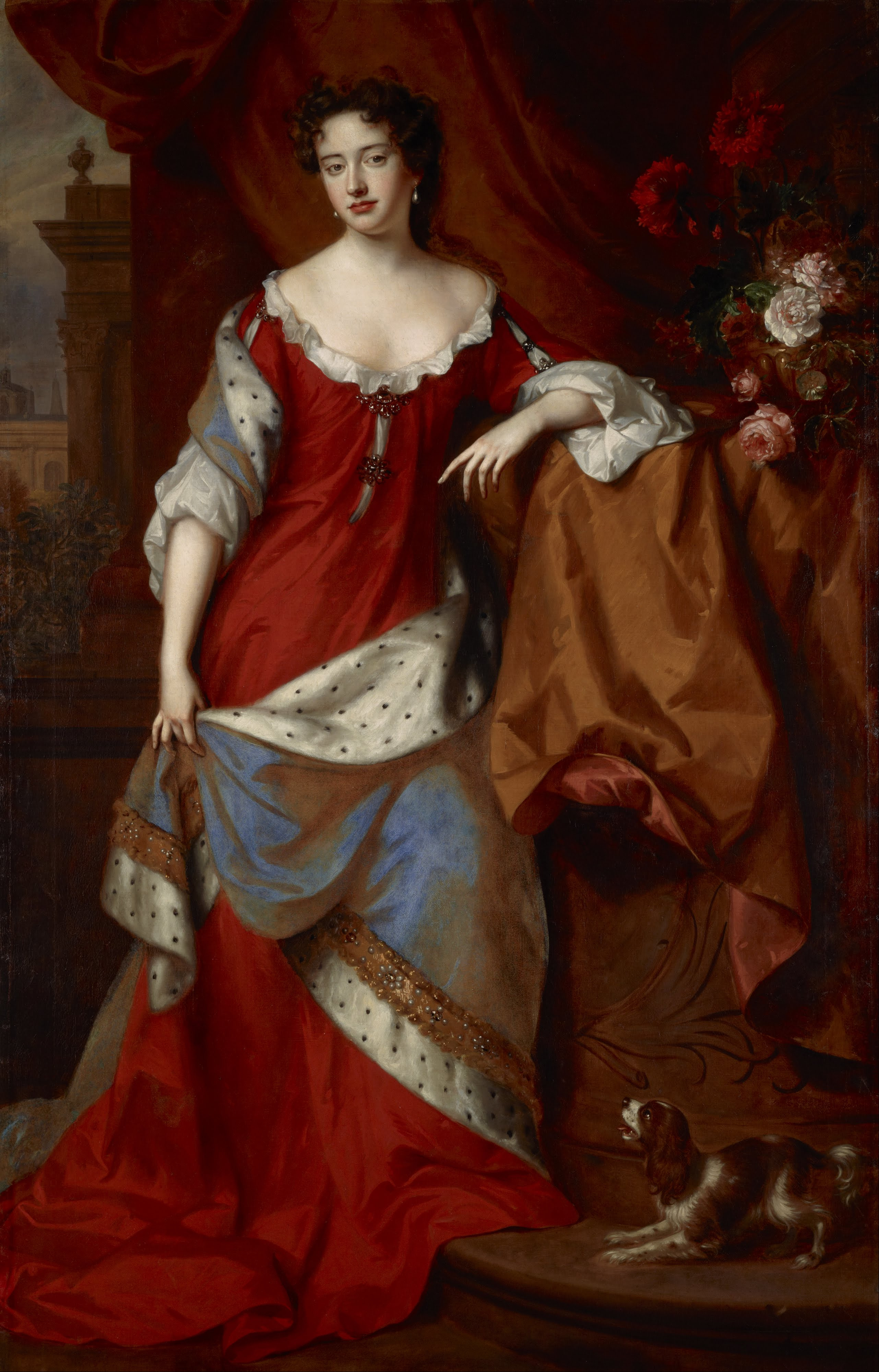
Anne, c. 1684, painted by Willem Wissing and Jan van der Vaardt

In November 1677, Anne's sister, Mary, married their Dutch first cousin William III of Orange at St James's Palace, but Anne could not attend the wedding because she was confined to her room with smallpox. By the time she recovered, Mary had already left for her new life in the Netherlands. Lady Frances Villiers contracted the disease and died. Anne's aunt Lady Henrietta Hyde (the wife of Laurence Hyde) was appointed as her new governess. A year later, Anne and her stepmother visited Mary in Holland for two weeks.

The Duke and Duchess of York retired to Brussels in March 1679 in the wake of anti-Catholic hysteria fed by the Popish Plot, and Anne visited them from the end of August. In October, all three returned to Britain: Anne to England, and her father and stepmother to Scotland. She joined them at Holyrood Palace in Edinburgh from July 1681 until May 1682. It was her last journey outside England.

Anne's second cousin George of Hanover visited London for three months from December 1680, sparking rumours of a potential marriage between them. Historian Edward Gregg dismissed the rumours as ungrounded, as her father was essentially exiled from court, and the Hanoverians planned to marry George to his first cousin Sophia Dorothea of Celle as part of a scheme to unite the Hanoverian inheritance. Other rumours claimed she was courted by Lord Mulgrave, although he denied it. Nevertheless, as a result of the gossip, he was temporarily dismissed from court.

With George of Hanover out of contention as a suitor for Anne, King Charles looked elsewhere for an eligible prince who would be welcomed as a groom by his Protestant subjects but also acceptable to his Catholic ally Louis XIV of France. The Danes were Protestant allies of the French, and Louis XIV was keen on an Anglo-Danish alliance to contain the power of the Dutch. A marriage treaty between Anne and Prince George of Denmark, younger brother of King Christian V, was negotiated by Anne's uncle Laurence Hyde, who had been made Earl of Rochester, and the English Secretary of State for the Northern Department, Robert Spencer, 2nd Earl of Sunderland. Anne and George were second cousins once removed. Anne's father consented to the marriage eagerly because it diminished the influence of his other son-in-law, William of Orange, who was naturally unhappy at the match.

Bishop Compton officiated at Anne and George's wedding on 28 July 1683 in the Chapel Royal at St James's Palace. Although it was an arranged marriage, they were faithful and devoted partners. They were given a set of buildings, known as the Cockpit, in the Palace of Whitehall as their London residence, and Sarah Churchill was appointed one of Anne's ladies of the bedchamber. Within months of the marriage, Anne was pregnant, but the baby was stillborn in May 1684. Anne recovered at the spa town of Tunbridge Wells, and over the next two years, gave birth to two daughters in quick succession: Mary and Anne Sophia.

== Accession of James II ==
When Charles II died in 1685, Anne's father became King James II of England and VII of Scotland. To the consternation of the English people, James began to give Catholics military and administrative offices, in contravention of the Test Acts, which were designed to prevent such appointments. Anne shared the general concern, and continued to attend Anglican services. As her sister Mary lived in the Netherlands, Anne and her family were the only members of the royal family attending Protestant religious services in England. When her father tried to get Anne to baptise her youngest daughter into the Catholic faith, Anne burst into tears. "[T]he doctrine of the Church of Rome is wicked and dangerous", she wrote to her sister, "their ceremonies—most of them—plain downright idolatry." Anne became estranged from her father and stepmother, as James moved to weaken the Church of England's power.

In early 1687, within a matter of days, Anne miscarried, her husband caught smallpox, and their two young daughters died of the same infection. Lady Rachel Russell wrote that George and Anne had "taken [the deaths] very heavily ... Sometimes they wept, sometimes they mourned in words; then sat silent, hand in hand; he sick in bed, and she the carefullest nurse to him that can be imagined." Later that year, she suffered another stillbirth.

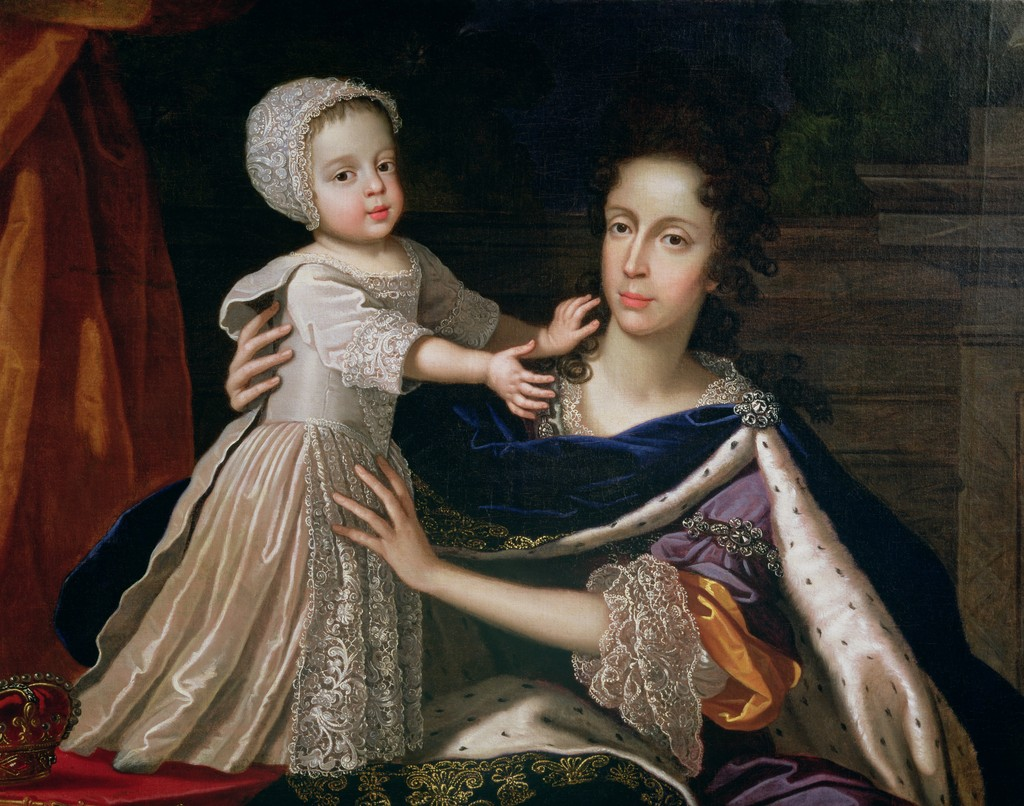
Mary of Modena and James Francis Edward Stuart, Anne's stepmother and half-brother

Public alarm at James's Catholicism increased when his wife, Mary of Modena, became pregnant for the first time since James's accession. In letters to her sister Mary, Anne raised suspicions that the Queen was faking her pregnancy in an attempt to introduce a false heir. She wrote, "they will stick at nothing, be it never so wicked, if it will promote their interest ... there may be foul play intended." Anne had another miscarriage in April 1688, and left London to recuperate in the spa town of Bath.

Anne's stepmother gave birth to a son, James Francis Edward Stuart, on 10 June 1688, and a Catholic succession became more likely. Anne was still at Bath, so she did not witness the birth, which fed the belief that the child was spurious. Anne may have left the capital deliberately to avoid being present, or because she was genuinely ill, but it is also possible that James desired the exclusion of all Protestants, including his daughter, from affairs of state. "I shall never now be satisfied", Anne wrote to her sister Mary, "whether the child be true or false. It may be it is our brother, but God only knows ... one cannot help having a thousand fears and melancholy thoughts, but whatever changes may happen you shall ever find me firm to my religion and faithfully yours."

To dispel rumours of a supposititious child, James had 40 witnesses to the birth attend a Privy Council meeting, but Anne claimed she could not attend because she was pregnant (which she was not) and then declined to read the depositions because it was "not necessary".

== Glorious Revolution ==
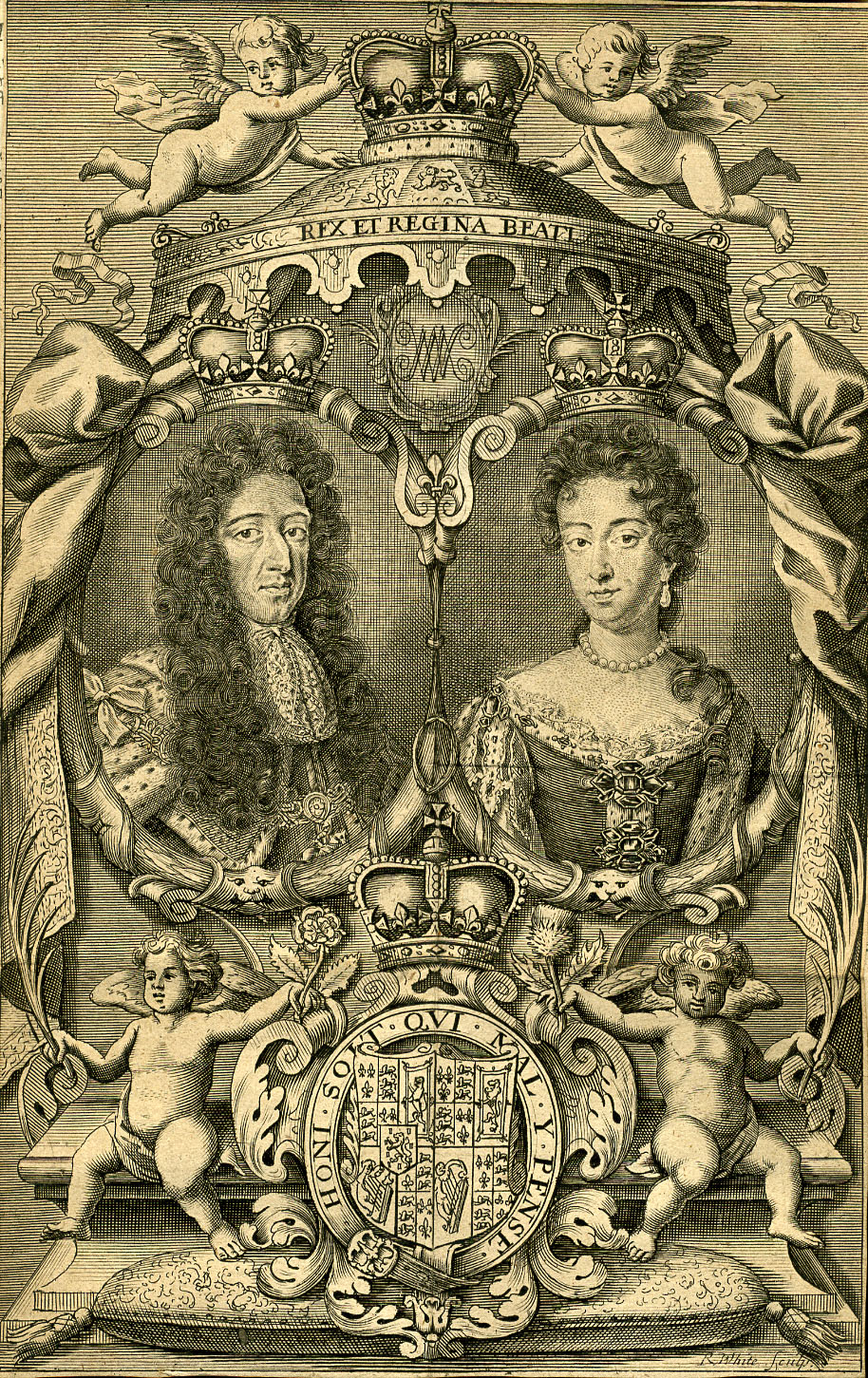
Engraving of William and Mary

William of Orange invaded England on 5 November 1688 in the Glorious Revolution, which ultimately deposed King James. Forbidden by James to pay Mary a projected visit in the spring of 1687, Anne corresponded with her and was aware of the plans to invade. On the advice of the Churchills, she refused to side with James after William landed and instead wrote to William on 18 November declaring her approval of his action. Churchill abandoned the unpopular King James on the 24th. George followed suit that night, and in the evening of the following day James issued orders to place Sarah Churchill under house arrest at St James's Palace.

Anne and Sarah fled from Whitehall by a back staircase, putting themselves under the care of Bishop Compton. They spent one night in his house, and subsequently arrived at Nottingham on 1 December. Two weeks later and escorted by a large company, Anne arrived at Oxford, where she met George in triumph. "God help me!", lamented James on discovering Anne's desertion on 26 November, "Even my children have forsaken me." On 19 December, Anne returned to London, where she was at once visited by William. James fled to France on the 23rd. Anne showed no concern at the news of her father's flight, and instead merely asked for her usual game of cards. She justified herself by saying that she "was used to play and never loved to do anything that looked like an affected constraint".

In January 1689, a Convention Parliament assembled in England and declared that James had effectively abdicated when he fled, and that the thrones of England and Ireland were therefore vacant. The Parliament or Estates of Scotland took similar action, and William and Mary were declared monarchs of all three realms. The Bill of Rights 1689 and Claim of Right Act 1689 settled the succession. Anne and her descendants were to be in the line of succession after William and Mary, and they were to be followed by any descendants of William by a future marriage. On 24 July 1689, Anne gave birth to a son, Prince William, Duke of Gloucester, who, though ill, survived infancy. As William and Mary had no children, it looked as though Anne's son would inherit the Crown.

== William and Mary ==
Soon after their accession, William and Mary rewarded John Churchill by granting him the Earldom of Marlborough and George was made Duke of Cumberland. Anne requested the use of Richmond Palace and a parliamentary allowance. William and Mary refused the first, and unsuccessfully opposed the latter, both of which caused tension between the two sisters. Anne's resentment grew worse when William refused to allow George to serve in the military in an active capacity. The new king and queen feared that Anne's financial independence would weaken their influence over her and allow her to organise a rival political faction. From around this time, at Anne's request she and Sarah Churchill, Lady Marlborough, began to call each other the pet names Mrs. Morley and Mrs. Freeman, respectively, to facilitate a relationship of greater equality between the two when they were alone.

In January 1692, suspecting that Marlborough was secretly conspiring with James's followers, the Jacobites, William and Mary dismissed him from all his offices. In a public show of support for the Marlboroughs, Anne took Sarah to a social event at the palace, and refused her sister's request to dismiss Sarah from her household. Lady Marlborough was subsequently removed from the royal household by the Lord Chamberlain, and Anne angrily left her royal lodgings and took up residence at Syon House, the home of the Duke of Somerset. Anne was stripped of her guard of honour; courtiers were forbidden to visit her, and civic authorities were instructed to ignore her. In April, Anne gave birth to a son who died within minutes. Mary visited her, but instead of offering comfort took the opportunity to berate Anne once again for her friendship with Sarah. The sisters never saw each other again. Later that year, Anne moved to Berkeley House in Piccadilly, London, where she had a stillborn daughter in March 1693.

When Mary died of smallpox in 1694, William continued to reign alone. Anne became his heir apparent, since any children he might have by another wife were assigned to a lower place in the line of succession, and the two reconciled publicly. He restored her previous honours, allowed her to reside in St James's Palace, and gave her Mary's jewels, but excluded her from government and refrained from appointing her regent during his absences abroad. Three months later, William restored Marlborough to his offices. With Anne's restoration at court, Berkeley House became a social centre for courtiers who had previously avoided contact with Anne and her husband.

According to James, Anne wrote to him in 1696 requesting his permission to succeed William, and thereafter promising to restore the Crown to James's line at a convenient opportunity; he declined to give his consent. She was probably trying to ensure her own succession by attempting to prevent a direct claim by James.

=== Act of Settlement ===
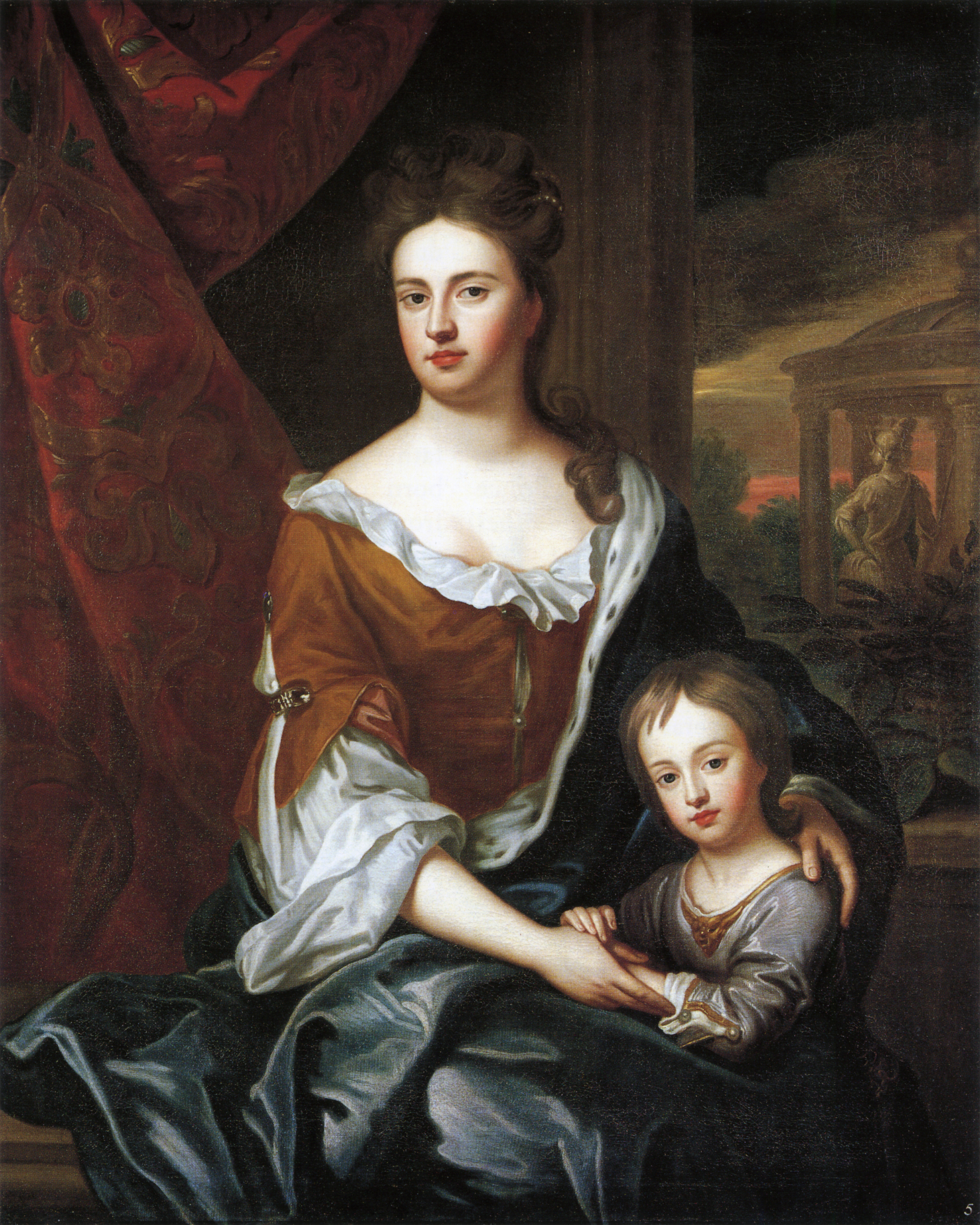
Anne with her son Prince William, Duke of Gloucester, in a painting from the school of Sir Godfrey Kneller, circa 1694

Anne's final pregnancy ended on 25 January 1700 with a stillbirth. She had been pregnant at least 17 times over as many years, and had miscarriages or stillbirths at least 12 times. Of her five liveborn children, four died before the age of two. Anne experienced bouts of "gout" (pains in her limbs and eventually stomach and head) from at least 1698. Based on her foetal losses and physical symptoms, she may have had systemic lupus erythematosus, or antiphospholipid syndrome. Alternatively, pelvic inflammatory disease could explain why the onset of her symptoms roughly coincided with her penultimate pregnancy. Other suggested causes of her failed pregnancies are listeriosis, diabetes, intrauterine growth retardation, and rhesus incompatibility. Rhesus incompatibility, however, generally worsens with successive pregnancies, and so does not fit the pattern of Anne's pregnancies, as her only son to survive infancy, Prince William, Duke of Gloucester, was born after a series of stillbirths. Experts also believe syphilis, porphyria and pelvic deformation to be unlikely as the symptoms are incompatible with her medical history.

Anne's gout rendered her lame for much of her later life. Around the court, she was carried in a sedan chair, or used a wheelchair. Around her estates, she used a one-horse chaise, which she drove herself "furiously like Jehu and a mighty hunter like Nimrod". She gained weight as a result of her sedentary lifestyle; in Sarah's words, "she grew exceeding gross and corpulent. There was something of majesty in her look, but mixed with a gloominess of soul". Sir John Clerk, 1st Baronet, described her in 1706:

under a fit of the gout and in extreme pain and agony, and on this occasion everything about her was much in the same disorder as about the meanest of her subjects. Her face, which was red and spotted, was rendered something frightful by her negligent dress, and the foot affected was tied up with a poultice and some nasty bandages. I was much affected by this sight ...

Anne's sole surviving child, the Duke of Gloucester, died at age 11 on 30 July 1700. She and her husband were "overwhelmed with grief". Anne ordered her household to observe a day of mourning every year on the anniversary of his death. With William childless and Gloucester dead, Anne was the only person remaining in the line of succession established by the Bill of Rights 1689. To address the succession crisis and preclude a Catholic restoration, the Parliament of England enacted the Act of Settlement 1701, which provided that, failing the issue of Anne and of William III by any future marriage, the Crown of England and Ireland would go to Sophia of Hanover, and her Protestant descendants. Sophia was the granddaughter of James VI and I through his daughter Elizabeth, who was the sister of Anne's grandfather Charles I. Over 50 Catholics with stronger claims were excluded from the line of succession. Anne's father died in September 1701. His widow, the former queen, wrote to Anne to inform her that her father forgave her and to remind her of her promise to seek the restoration of his line, but Anne had already acquiesced to the line of succession created by the Act of Settlement.

== Reign ==
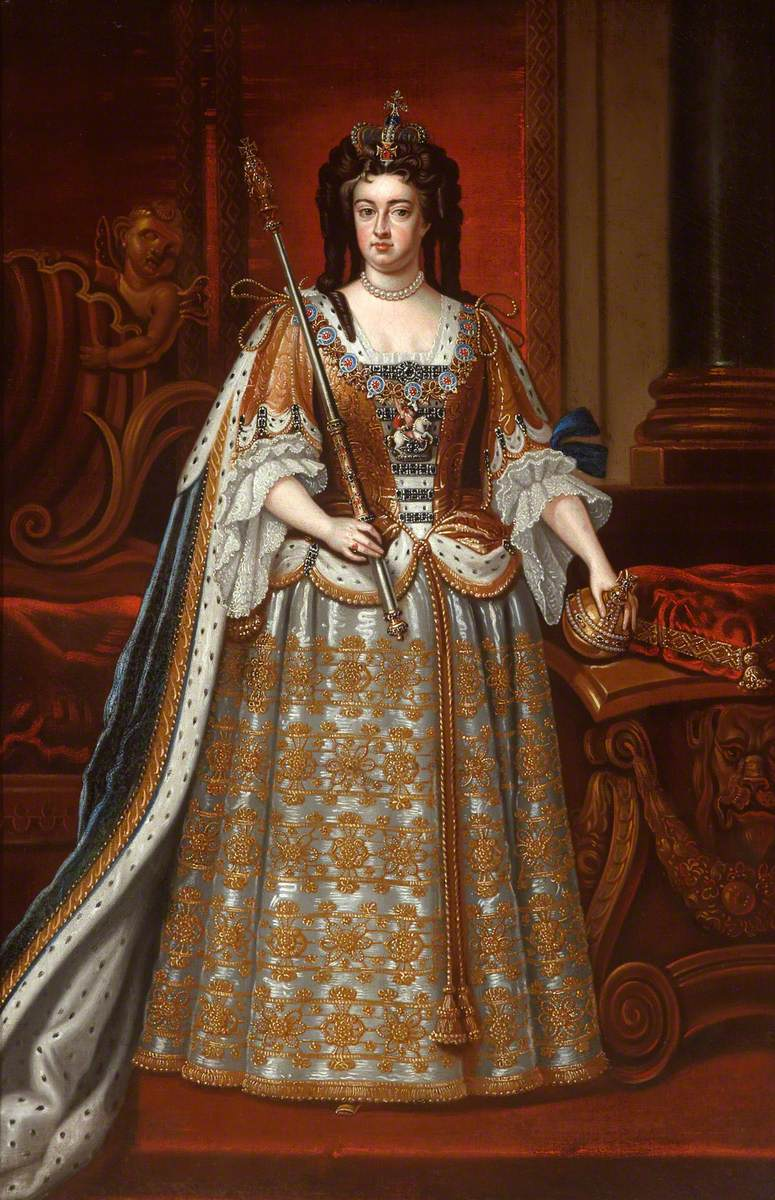
Queen Anne in her coronation robes

Anne became queen upon the death of King William III on 8 March 1702, and was immediately popular. In her first speech to the English Parliament, on 11 March, she distanced herself from her late Dutch brother-in-law and said, "As I know my heart to be entirely English, I can very sincerely assure you there is not anything you can expect or desire from me which I shall not be ready to do for the happiness and prosperity of England."

Soon after her accession, Anne appointed her husband Lord High Admiral, giving him nominal control of the Royal Navy. Anne gave control of the army to Lord Marlborough, whom she appointed Captain-General. Marlborough also received numerous honours from the Queen; he was created a Knight of the Garter and was elevated to the rank of duke. The Duchess of Marlborough was appointed Groom of the Stool, Mistress of the Robes, and Keeper of the Privy Purse.

Anne was crowned on St George's Day, 23 April 1702. Affected by gout, she was carried to Westminster Abbey in an open sedan chair, with a low back to permit her train to flow out behind her. On 4 May, England became embroiled in the War of the Spanish Succession, in which England, Austria, and the Dutch Republic fought against France and Bourbon Spain. Charles II of Spain had died childless in 1700, and the succession was disputed by two claimants: the Habsburg Archduke Charles of Austria and the Bourbon Philip, Duke of Anjou.

She took a lively interest in affairs of state, and was a patron of theatre, poetry and music. She subsidised George Frideric Handel with £200 a year. She sponsored high-quality medals as rewards for political or military achievements. They were produced at the Mint by Isaac Newton and John Croker. She knighted Newton when she visited Cambridge in 1705.

=== Acts of Union ===
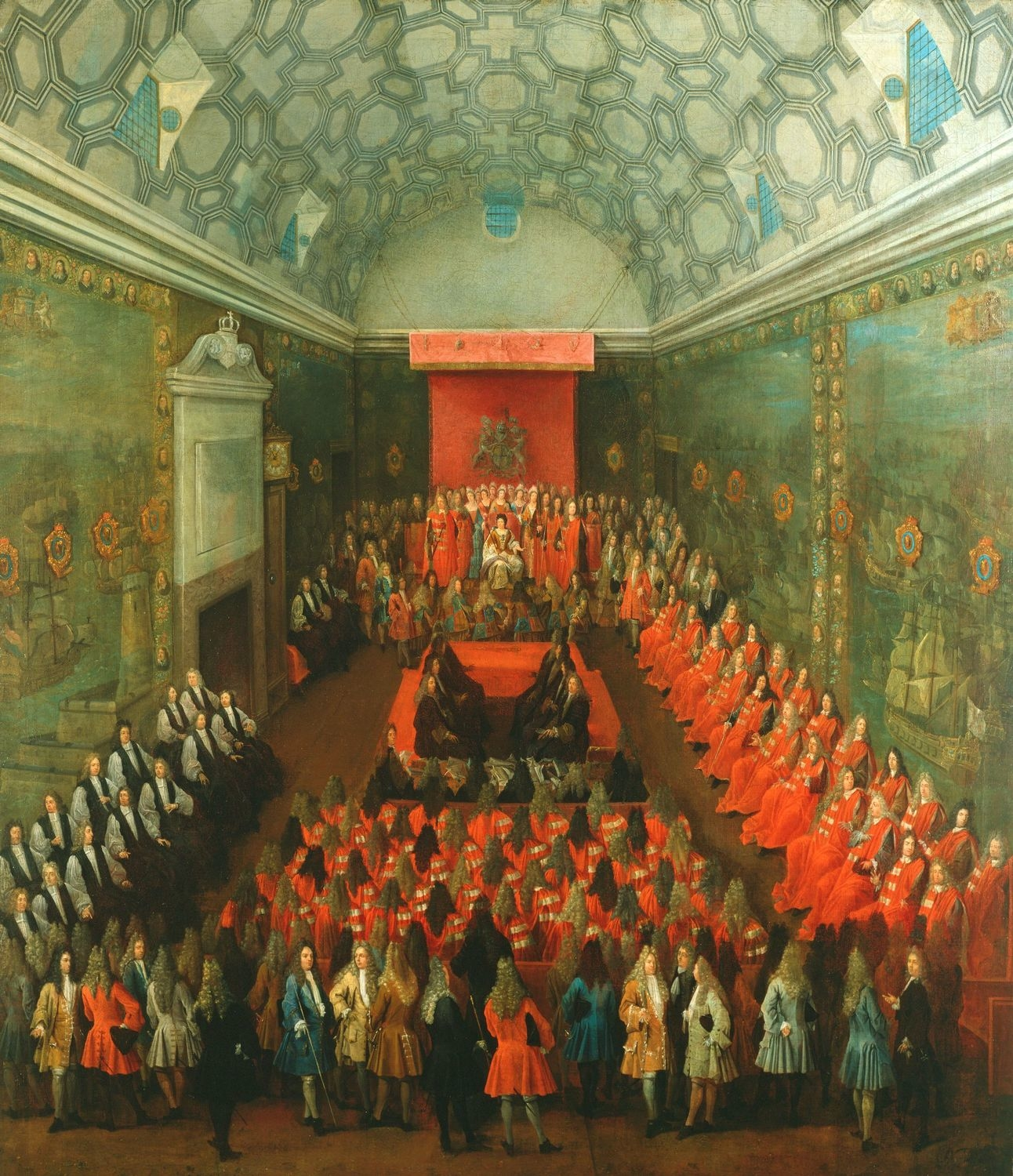
Queen Anne addressing the House of Lords (c. after 1708) painted by Peter Tillemans)

While Ireland was subordinate to the English Crown and Wales formed part of the kingdom of England, Scotland remained an independent sovereign state with its own parliament and laws. The Act of Settlement 1701, passed by the English Parliament, applied in the kingdoms of England and Ireland but not Scotland, where a strong minority wished to preserve the Stuart dynasty and its right of inheritance to the throne. Anne had declared it "very necessary" to conclude a union of England and Scotland in her first speech to the English Parliament, and a joint Anglo-Scots commission met at her former residence, the Cockpit, to discuss terms in October 1702. The negotiations broke up in early February 1703, having failed to reach an agreement. The Estates of Scotland responded to the Act of Settlement by passing the Act of Security, which gave the Estates the power, if the Queen had no further children, to choose the next Scottish monarch from among the Protestant descendants of the royal line of Scotland. The individual chosen by the Estates could not be the same person who came to the English throne, unless England granted full freedom of trade to Scottish merchants. At first, Anne withheld royal assent to the act, but she granted it the following year when the Estates threatened to withhold supply, endangering Scottish support for England's wars.

In its turn, the English Parliament responded with the Alien Act 1705, which threatened to impose economic sanctions and declare Scottish subjects aliens in England, unless Scotland either repealed the Act of Security or moved to unite with England. The Estates chose the latter option; the English Parliament agreed to repeal the Alien Act, and new commissioners were appointed by Queen Anne in early 1706 to negotiate the terms of a union. The articles of union approved by the commissioners were presented to Anne on 23 July 1706 and ratified by the Scottish and English Parliaments on 16 January and 6 March 1707, respectively. Under the Acts of Union, England and Scotland were united into a single kingdom called Great Britain, with one parliament, on 1 May 1707. A consistent and ardent supporter of union despite opposition on both sides of the border, Anne attended a thanksgiving service in St Paul's Cathedral. The Scot Sir John Clerk, 1st Baronet, who also attended, wrote, "nobody on this occasion appeared more sincerely devout and thankful than the Queen herself".

=== Two-party politics ===
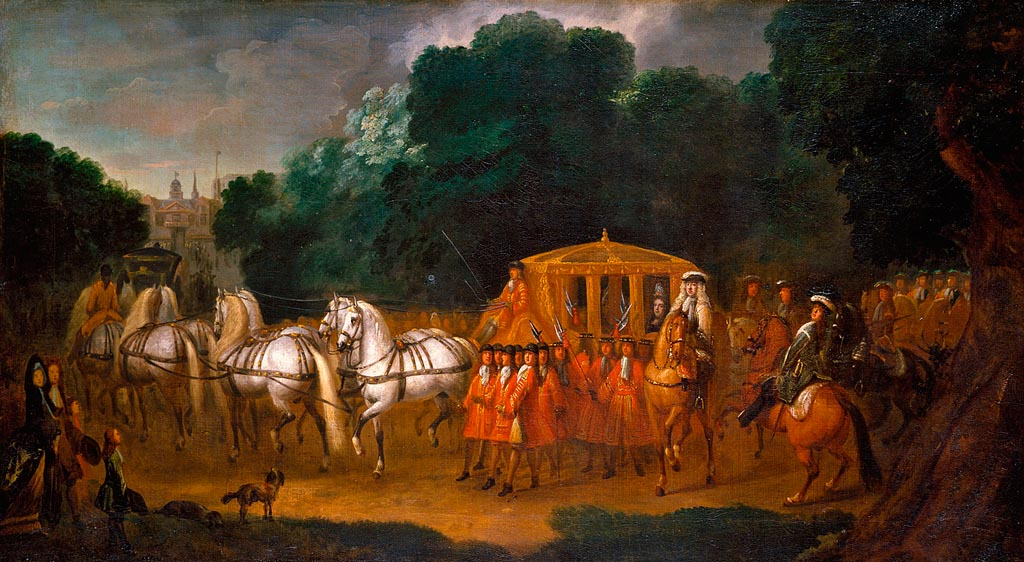
Queen Anne's Procession to the Houses of Parliament by Alexander van Gaelen

Anne's reign was marked by the further development of a two-party system. In general, the Tories were supportive of the Anglican church and favoured the landed interest of the country gentry, while the Whigs were aligned with commercial interests and Protestant Dissenters. As a committed Anglican, Anne was inclined to favour the Tories. Her first ministry was predominantly Tory, and contained such High Tories as Daniel Finch, 2nd Earl of Nottingham, and her uncle Laurence Hyde, 1st Earl of Rochester. It was headed by Lord Treasurer Lord Godolphin and Anne's favourite the Duke of Marlborough, who were considered moderate Tories, along with the Speaker of the House of Commons, Robert Harley.

Anne supported the Occasional Conformity Bill of 1702, which was promoted by the Tories and opposed by the Whigs. The bill aimed to disqualify Protestant Dissenters from public office by closing a loophole in the Test Acts, legislation that restricted public office to Anglican conformists. The existing law permitted nonconformists to take office if they took Anglican communion once a year. Anne's husband was placed in an unfortunate position when Anne forced him to vote for the bill, even though, being a Lutheran, he was an occasional conformist himself. The Whigs successfully blocked the bill for the duration of the parliamentary session. Anne reinstituted the traditional religious practice of touching for the king's evil that had been eschewed by William as papist superstition. After the Great Storm of 1703, Anne declared a general fast to implore God "to pardon the crying sins of this nation which had drawn down this sad judgement". The Occasional Conformity Bill was revived in the wake of the storm, but Anne withheld support, fearing its reintroduction was a ruse to cause a political quarrel. Once again it failed. A third attempt to introduce the bill as an amendment to a money bill in November 1704 was also thwarted.

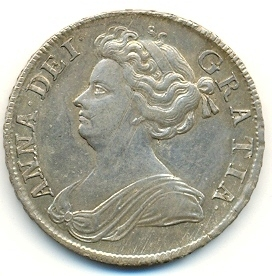
Half-crown coin of Queen Anne, 1708. The inscription reads in Latin: ANNA DEI GRATIA (Anne by the Grace of God).

The Whigs vigorously supported the War of the Spanish Succession and became even more influential after the Duke of Marlborough won a great victory at the Battle of Blenheim in 1704. Many of the High Tories, who opposed British involvement in the land war against France, were removed from office. Godolphin, Marlborough, and Harley, who had replaced Nottingham as Secretary of State for the Northern Department, formed a ruling "triumvirate". They were forced to rely more and more on support from the Whigs, and particularly from the Whig Junto—Lords Somers, Halifax, Orford, Wharton and Sunderland—whom Anne disliked. Sarah, the Duchess of Marlborough, incessantly badgered the Queen to appoint more Whigs and reduce the power of the Tories, whom she considered little better than Jacobites, and the Queen became increasingly discontented with her.

In 1706, Godolphin and the Marlboroughs forced Anne to accept Lord Sunderland, a Junto Whig and the Marlboroughs' son-in-law, as Harley's colleague as Secretary of State for the Southern Department. Although this strengthened the ministry's position in Parliament, it weakened the ministry's position with the Queen, as Anne became increasingly irritated with Godolphin and with her former favourite, the Duchess of Marlborough, for supporting Sunderland and other Whig candidates for vacant government and church positions. The Queen turned for private advice to Harley, who was uncomfortable with Marlborough and Godolphin's turn towards the Whigs. She also turned to Abigail Hill, a woman of the bedchamber whose influence grew as Anne's relationship with Sarah deteriorated. Abigail was related to both Harley and the Duchess, but was politically closer to Harley, and acted as an intermediary between him and the Queen. The division within the ministry came to a head on 8 February 1708, when Godolphin and the Marlboroughs insisted that the Queen had to either dismiss Harley or do without their services. When the Queen seemed to hesitate, Marlborough and Godolphin refused to attend a cabinet meeting. Harley attempted to lead business without his former colleagues, and several of those present including Charles Seymour, Duke of Somerset refused to participate until they returned. Her hand forced, the Queen dismissed Harley.

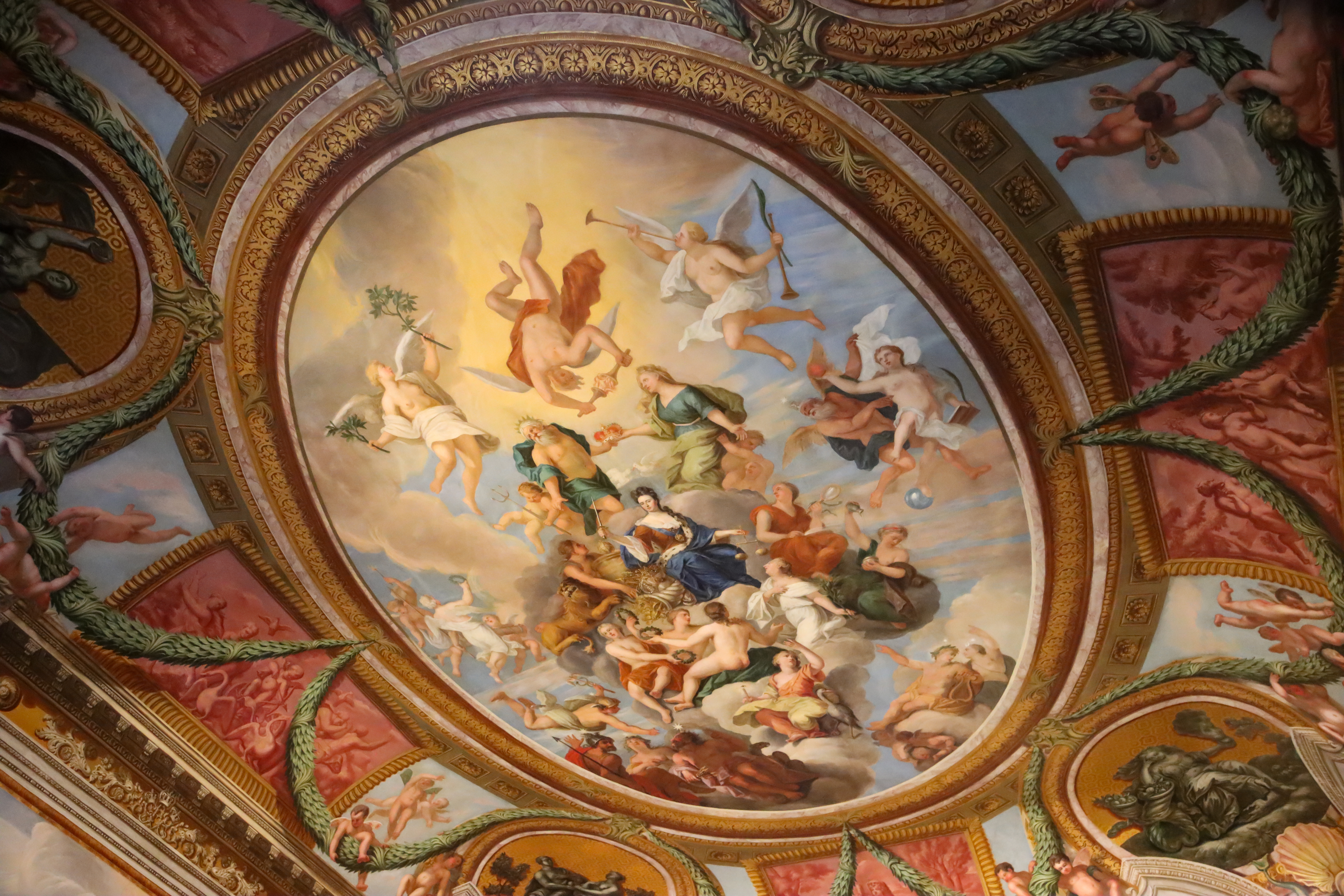
A fresco at Hampton Court Palace depicts Queen Anne as Justice, holding a sword and scales, surrounded by personified virtues. Britannia and Neptune are shown crowning her.

The following month, Anne's Catholic half-brother, James Francis Edward Stuart, attempted to land in Scotland with French assistance in an attempt to establish himself as king. Anne withheld royal assent from the Scottish Militia Bill 1708 in case the militia raised in Scotland was disloyal and sided with the Jacobites. She was the last British sovereign to veto a parliamentary bill, although her action was barely commented upon at the time. The invasion fleet never landed and was chased away by British ships commanded by Sir George Byng. As a result of the Jacobite invasion scare, support for the Tories fell and the Whigs were able to secure a majority in the 1708 British general election.

The Duchess of Marlborough was angered when Abigail moved into rooms at Kensington Palace that Sarah considered her own, though she rarely if ever used them. In July 1708, she came to court with a bawdy poem written by a Whig propagandist, probably Arthur Maynwaring, that implied a lesbian relationship between Anne and Abigail. The Duchess wrote to Anne telling her she had damaged her reputation by conceiving "a great passion for such a woman ... strange and unaccountable". Sarah thought Abigail had risen above her station, writing "I never thought her education was such as to make her fit company for a great queen. Many people have liked the humour of their chambermaids and have been very kind to them, but 'tis very uncommon to hold a private correspondence with them and put them upon the foot of a friend." While some modern commentators have concluded Anne was a lesbian, most have rejected this analysis. (Note: Professor Valerie Traub writes, "Although this scandal features prominently in biographies of the Queen, the charges generally are dismissed as the hysterical vindictiveness of a power-hungry Duchess".) In the opinion of Anne's biographers, she considered Abigail nothing more than a trusted servant and was a woman of strong traditional beliefs who was devoted to her husband.

At a thanksgiving service for a victory at the Battle of Oudenarde, Anne did not wear the jewels that Sarah had selected for her. At the door of St Paul's Cathedral, they had an argument that culminated in Sarah offending the Queen by telling her to be quiet. Anne was dismayed. When Sarah forwarded an unrelated letter from her husband to Anne, with a covering note continuing the argument, Anne wrote back pointedly, "After the commands you gave me on the thanksgiving day of not answering you, I should not have troubled you with these lines, but to return the Duke of Marlborough's letter safe into your hands, and for the same reason do not say anything to that, nor to yours which enclosed it."

=== Death of Prince George ===
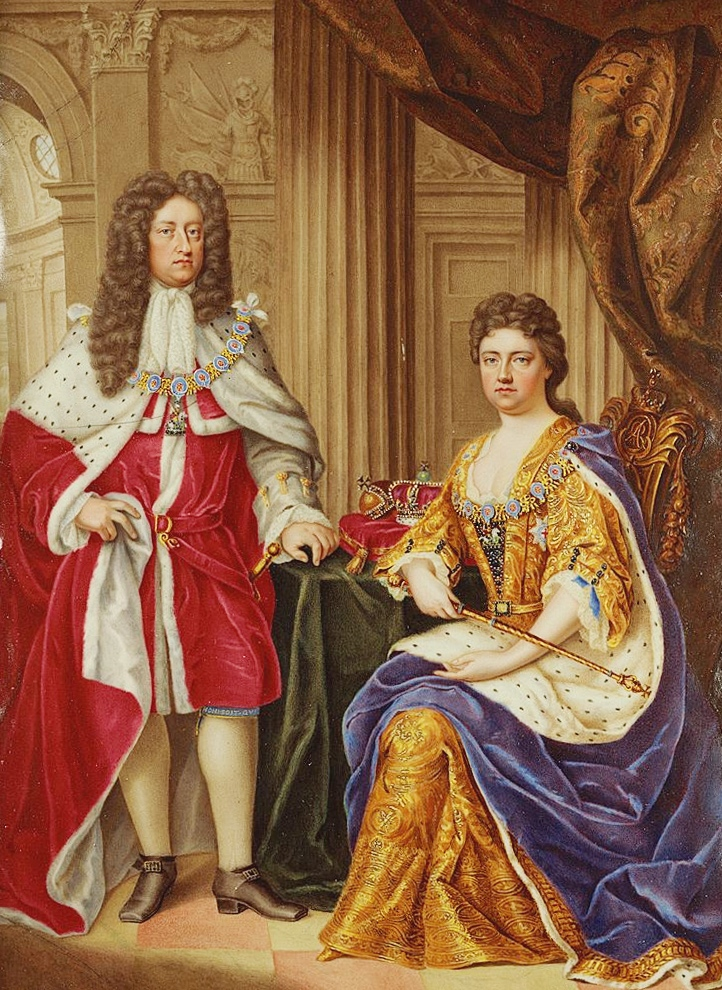
Anne and George, painted by Charles Boit, 1706

Anne was devastated by Prince George's death in October 1708, and it proved a turning point in her relationship with the Duchess of Marlborough. The Duchess arrived at Kensington Palace shortly before George died, and after his death insisted that Anne leave Kensington for St James's Palace against her wishes. Anne resented the Duchess's intrusive actions, which included removing a portrait of George from the Queen's bedchamber and then refusing to return it in the belief that it was natural "to avoid seeing of papers or anything that belonged to one that one loved when they were just dead".

The Whigs used George's death to their own advantage. The leadership of the Admiralty was unpopular among the Whig leaders, who had blamed Prince George and his deputy George Churchill (who was Marlborough's brother) for mismanagement of the navy. With Whigs now dominant in Parliament, and Anne distraught at the loss of her husband, they forced her to accept the Junto leaders Lords Somers and Wharton into the cabinet. Anne, however, insisted on carrying out the duties of Lord High Admiral herself, without appointing a member of the government to take George's place. Undeterred, the Junto demanded the appointment of the Earl of Orford, another member of the Junto and one of the prince's leading critics, as First Lord of the Admiralty. Anne appointed the moderate Earl of Pembroke, on 29 November 1708. Pressure mounted on Pembroke, Godolphin and the Queen from the dissatisfied Junto Whigs, and Pembroke resigned after less than a year in office. Another month of arguments followed before the Queen finally consented to put Orford in control of the Admiralty as First Lord in November 1709.

Sarah continued to berate Anne for her friendship with Abigail and, in October 1709, Anne wrote to the Duke of Marlborough asking that his wife "leave off teasing & tormenting me & behave herself with the decency she ought both to her friend and Queen". On Maundy Thursday 6 April 1710, Anne and Sarah saw each other for the last time. According to Sarah, the Queen was taciturn and formal, repeating the same phrases—"Whatever you have to say you may put in writing" and "You said you desired no answer, and I shall give you none"—over and over.

=== War of the Spanish Succession ===
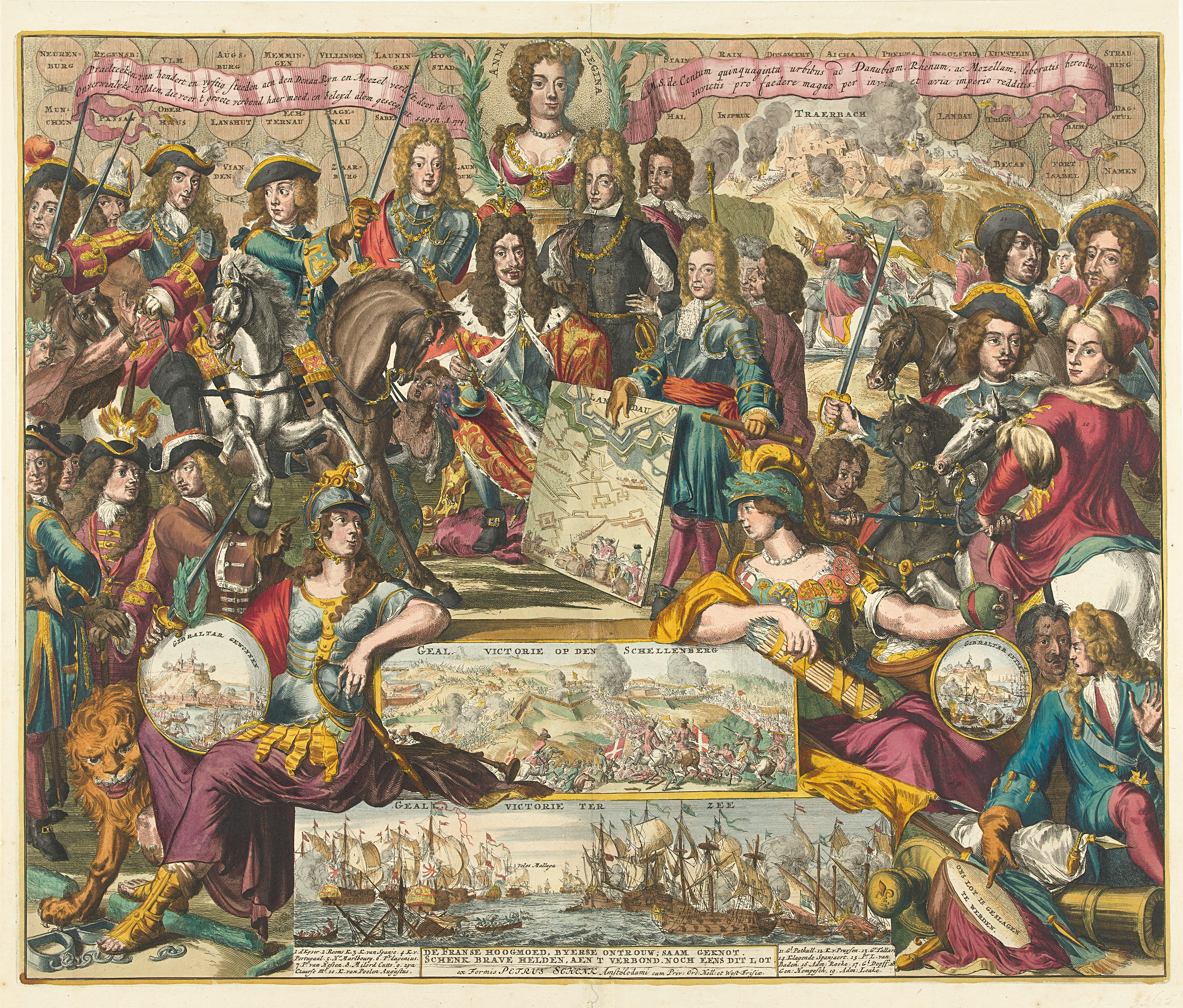
Allegory of the victory of the Grand Alliance at Schellenberg in 1704. The bust of Queen Anne at the top is surrounded by Allied leaders.

As the expensive War of the Spanish Succession grew unpopular, so did the Whig administration. The impeachment of Henry Sacheverell, a high church Tory Anglican who had preached anti-Whig sermons, led to further public discontent. Anne thought Sacheverell ought to be punished for questioning the Glorious Revolution, but that his punishment should only be a mild one to prevent further public commotion. In London, riots broke out in support of Sacheverell, but the only troops available to quell the disturbances were Anne's guards, and Secretary of State Sunderland was reluctant to use them and leave the Queen less protected. Anne declared God would be her guard and ordered Sunderland to redeploy her troops. In line with Anne's views, Sacheverell was convicted, but his sentence—suspension of preaching for three years—was so light as to render the trial a mockery.

The Queen, increasingly disdainful of the Marlboroughs and her ministry, finally took the opportunity to dismiss Sunderland in June 1710. Godolphin followed in August. The Junto Whigs were removed from office, although Marlborough, for the moment, remained as commander of the army. In their place, she appointed a new ministry headed by Harley, which began to seek peace with France. Unlike the Whigs, Harley and his ministry were ready to compromise by giving Spain to the Bourbon claimant, Philip of Anjou, in return for commercial concessions. In the parliamentary elections that soon followed his appointment, Harley, aided by government patronage, secured a large Tory majority. In January 1711, Anne forced Sarah to resign her court offices, and Abigail took over as Keeper of the Privy Purse. Harley was stabbed by a disgruntled French refugee, the Marquis de Guiscard, in March, and Anne wept at the thought he would die. He recovered slowly. Godolphin's death from natural causes in September 1712 reduced Anne to tears; she blamed their estrangement on the Marlboroughs.

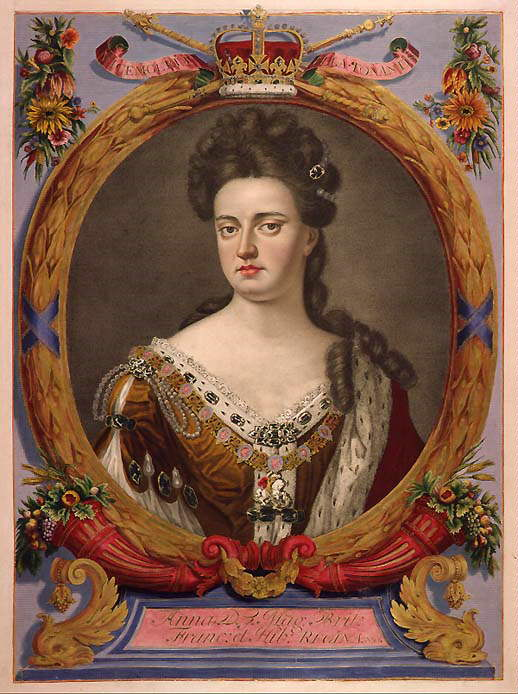
Tinted engraving of Anne from an atlas commissioned by Augustus the Strong, 1707

The elder brother of Archduke Charles, Emperor Joseph I, died in April 1711 and Charles succeeded him in Austria, Hungary and the Holy Roman Empire. To also give him the Spanish throne was no longer in Britain's interests, but the proposed Peace of Utrecht submitted to Parliament for ratification did not go as far as the Whigs wanted to curb Bourbon ambitions. In the House of Commons, the Tory majority was unassailable, but the same was not true in the House of Lords. The Whigs secured the support of the Earl of Nottingham against the treaty by promising to support his Occasional Conformity bill. Seeing a need for decisive action to erase the anti-peace majority in the House of Lords, and seeing no alternative, Anne reluctantly created twelve new peers, even though such a mass creation of peers was unprecedented. Abigail's husband, Samuel Masham, was made a baron, although Anne protested to Harley that she "never had any design to make a great lady of [Abigail], and should lose a useful servant". On the same day, Marlborough was dismissed as commander of the army. The peace treaty was ratified and Britain's military involvement in the War of the Spanish Succession ended.

By signing the Treaty of Utrecht, Louis XIV of France recognised the Hanoverian succession in Britain. Nevertheless, gossip that Anne and her ministers favoured the succession of her half-brother rather than the Hanoverians continued, despite Anne's denials in public and in private. The rumours were fed by her consistent refusals to permit any of the Hanoverians to visit or move to England, and by the intrigues of Harley and the Tory Secretary of State Lord Bolingbroke, who were in separate and secret discussions with her half-brother about a possible Stuart restoration until early 1714.

== Death ==
Anne was unable to walk between January and July 1713. At Christmas, she was feverish, and lay unconscious for hours, leading to rumours of her impending death. She recovered, but was seriously ill again in March 1714. By July, Anne had lost confidence in Harley; his secretary recorded that Anne told the cabinet "that he neglected all business; that he was seldom to be understood; that when he did explain himself, she could not depend upon the truth of what he said; that he never came to her at the time she appointed; that he often came drunk; [and] last, to crown all, he behaved himself towards her with ill manner, indecency and disrespect." On 27 July 1714, during Parliament's summer recess, she dismissed Harley as Lord Treasurer. Despite failing health, which her doctors blamed on the emotional strain of matters of state, she attended two late-night cabinet meetings that failed to determine Harley's successor. A third meeting was cancelled when she became too ill to attend. She was rendered unable to speak by a stroke on 30 July 1714, the anniversary of Gloucester's death, and on the advice of the Privy Council handed the treasurer's staff of office to Whig grandee Charles Talbot, 1st Duke of Shrewsbury.

Anne died around 7:30 am on 1 August 1714, aged 49. John Arbuthnot, one of her doctors, thought her death was a release from a life of ill-health and tragedy; he wrote to Jonathan Swift, "I believe sleep was never more welcome to a weary traveller than death was to her." She was buried beside her husband and children in the Henry VII Chapel on the South Aisle of Westminster Abbey on 24 August.

=== Succession ===
Electress Sophia of Hanover had died on 28 May, (Note: 8 June in the New Style Gregorian calendar in use in Hanover since 1700.) two months before Anne, so Sophia's son, George, Elector of Hanover, succeeded pursuant to the Act of Settlement 1701. The possible Catholic claimants, including Anne's half-brother, James Francis Edward Stuart, were ignored. The Elector's accession was relatively stable: a Jacobite rising in 1715 failed. Marlborough was reinstated, and the Tory ministers were replaced by Whigs.

== Legacy ==
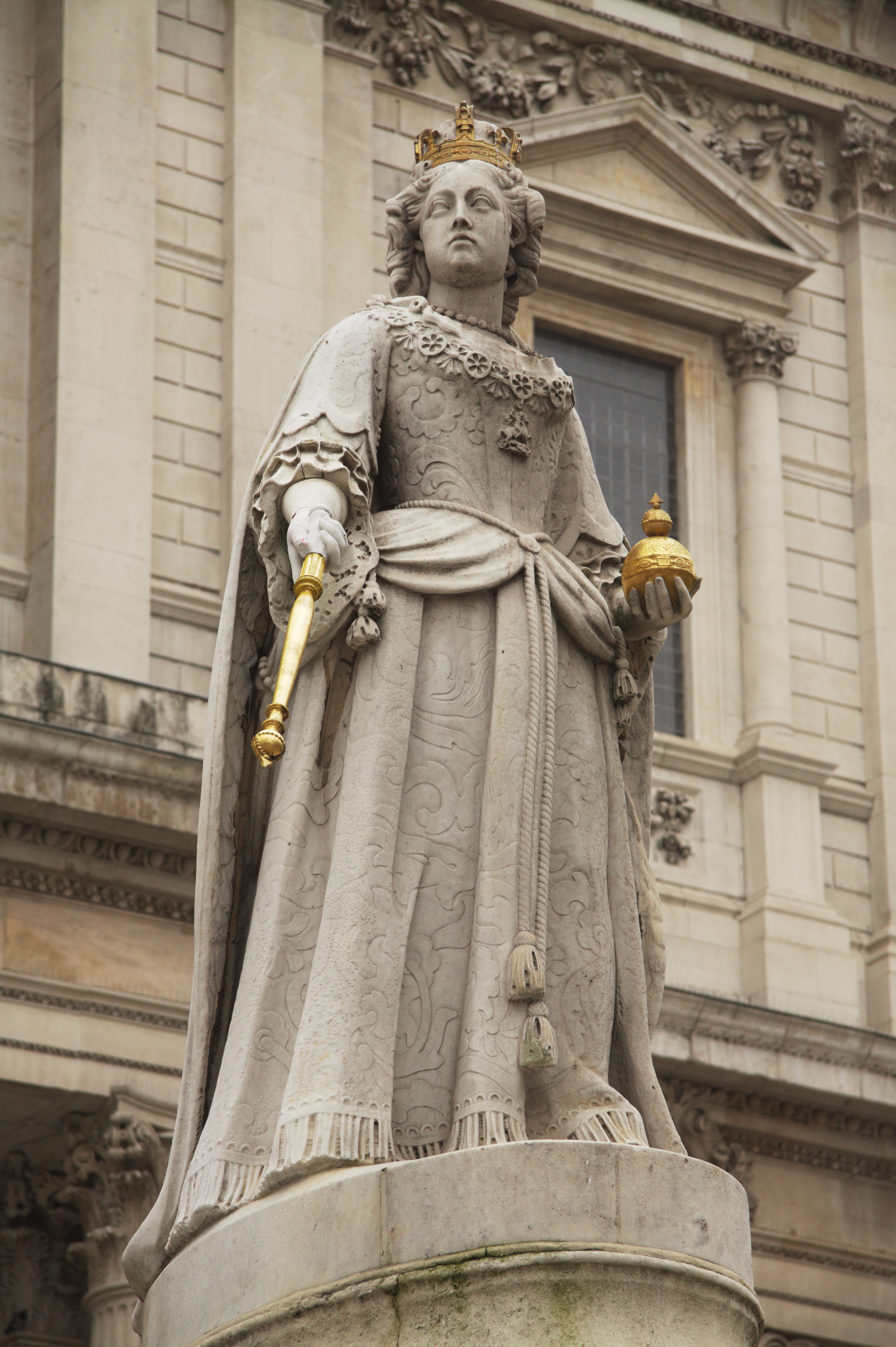
Statue of Anne in front of St Paul's Cathedral, London. A High Tory political opponent wrote that "it was fitting she was depicted with her rump to the church, gazing longingly into a wineshop".

The Duchess of Marlborough "unduly disparaged" Anne in her memoirs, and her prejudiced recollections persuaded many early biographers that Anne was "a weak, irresolute woman beset by bedchamber quarrels and deciding high policy on the basis of personalities". The Duchess wrote of Anne:

She certainly meant well and was not a fool, but nobody can maintain that she was wise, nor entertaining in conversation. She was ignorant in everything but what the parsons had taught her when a child ... Being very ignorant, very fearful, with very little judgement, it is easy to be seen she might mean well, being surrounded with so many artful people, who at last compassed their designs to her dishonour.

Historians have since viewed Anne more favourably. In his biography of 1980, Edward Gregg presents the Queen as a woman of invincible stubbornness, who was the central figure of her age. Gregg's argument depicts her reign as:

a period of significant progress for the country: Britain became a major military power on land, the union of England and Scotland created a united kingdom of Great Britain, and the economic and political base for the golden age of the 18th century was established. However, the Queen herself has received little credit for these achievements and has long been depicted as a weak and ineffectual monarch, dominated by her advisers.

In the opinion of modern historians, traditional assessments of Anne as fat, constantly pregnant, under the influence of favourites, and lacking political astuteness or interest may derive from sexist prejudices against women. Author David Green noted, "Hers was not, as used to be supposed, petticoat government. She had considerable power; yet time and time again she had to capitulate." Gregg concluded that Anne was often able to impose her will, even though, as a woman in an age of male dominance and preoccupied by her health, her reign was marked by an increase in the influence of ministers and a decrease in the influence of the Crown. She attended more cabinet meetings than any of her predecessors or successors, and presided over an age of artistic, literary, scientific, economic and political advancement that was made possible by the stability and prosperity of her reign. In architecture, Sir John Vanbrugh constructed Blenheim Palace and Castle Howard. Queen Anne-style architecture and Queen Anne-style furniture were named after her. Writers such as Daniel Defoe, Alexander Pope, and Jonathan Swift flourished. Henry Wise laid out new gardens at Blenheim, Kensington, Windsor and St James's. The union of England and Scotland, which Anne had fervently supported, created Europe's largest free trade area. The political and diplomatic achievements of Anne's governments, and the absence of constitutional conflict between monarch and parliament during her reign, indicate that she chose ministers and exercised her prerogatives wisely.

== Titles, styles and arms ==
- 6 February 1665 – 28 July 1683: Her Highness The Lady Anne
- 28 July 1683 – 8 March 1702: Her Royal Highness The Princess Anne of Denmark
- 8 March 1702 – 1 August 1714: Her Majesty The Queen

The official style of Anne before 1707 was "Anne, by the Grace of God, Queen of England, Scotland, France and Ireland, Defender of the Faith, etc." After the union, her style was "Anne, by the Grace of God, Queen of Great Britain, France and Ireland, Defender of the Faith, etc." In line with other monarchs of England between 1340 and 1800, Anne was styled "Queen of France", but did not actually reign in France.

As queen regnant, Anne's coat of arms before the union were the Stuart royal arms, in use since 1603: Quarterly; I and IV grandquarterly, Azure three fleurs-de-lis Or (for France) and Gules three lions passant guardant in pale Or (for England); II, Or, a lion rampant within a double tressure flory-counter-flory Gules (for Scotland); III, Azure, a harp Or stringed Argent (for Ireland). In 1702, Anne adopted the motto semper eadem ("always the same"), the same motto used by Queen Elizabeth I. The Acts of Union declared that: "the Ensigns Armorial of the said United Kingdom be such as Her Majesty shall appoint". In 1707, the union was heraldically expressed by the impalement, or placing side by side in the same quarter, of the arms of England and Scotland, which had previously been in different quarters. The new arms were: Quarterly; I and IV, Gules three lions passant guardant in pale Or (for England) impaling Or a lion rampant within a double tressure flory-counter-flory Gules (for Scotland); II, Azure, three fleurs-de-lis Or (for France); III, Azure, a harp Or stringed Argent (for Ireland). In Scotland, a separate form of arms was used on seals until the Act of Union.

Coats of arms of Anne

Coat of arms of Anne as Princess of Denmark

Coat of arms of Anne as Queen of England from 1702 to 1707

Coat of arms of Anne as Queen of Great Britain from 1707 to 1714

== Pregnancies and issue ==
Anne had seventeen pregnancies, of which five were live births. None of her children survived to adulthood.

| Child | Birth | Death | Burial | Notes |
|---|---|---|---|---|
| Stillborn daughter | 12 May 1684; London | | 13 May 1684; Westminster Abbey | |
| Mary | 2 June 1685; Palace of Whitehall | 8 February 1687; Windsor Castle | 10 February 1687 Westminster Abbey | Christened 2 June 1685 by the Bishop of London; styled "the Lady Mary". Died of smallpox. Mary, Anne Sophia (Mary's younger sister), and their father all becoming ill at Windsor Castle in early 1687. |
| Anne Sophia | 12 May 1686; Windsor Castle | 2 February 1687; Windsor Castle or Whitehall | 4 February 1687 Westminster Abbey | Christened by the Bishop of Durham, with Lady Churchill one of the godmothers; styled "the Lady Anne Sophia". |
| Miscarriage | 21 January 1687 | | | |
| Stillborn son | 22 October 1687; Whitehall | | 22 October 1687 Westminster Abbey | Anne gave birth at seven months, but the baby "lay dead a full month within her". |
| Miscarriage | 16 April 1688 | | | |
| Prince William, Duke of Gloucester | 24 July 1689; Hampton Court Palace | 30 July 1700; Windsor Castle | 9 August 1700 Westminster Abbey | Died of unclear causes at age 11. |
| Mary | 14 October 1690; St James's Palace | | 14 October 1690 Westminster Abbey | She was two months premature, and lived about two hours. |
| George | 17 April 1692; Syon House | | 18 April 1692 Westminster Abbey | He lived only for a few minutes, just long enough to be baptised; styled "Lord George". |
| Stillborn daughter | 23 March 1693; Berkeley House | | 24 March 1693 Westminster Abbey | |
| Miscarriage | 21 January 1694 | | | Modern historians Edward Gregg and Alison Weir do not agree on whether it was a son or possibly a daughter. Contemporary chronicler Narcissus Luttrell wrote only that Anne "miscarried of a dead child". |
| Miscarried daughter | 17 or 18 February 1696 | | | |
| Stillborn twins | 20 September 1696 | | | Luttrell said Anne "miscarried of a son". Nathaniel Johnston told Theophilus Hastings, 7th Earl of Huntingdon, in a letter dated 24 October 1696, "Her Royal Highness miscarried of two children, the one of seven months' growth, the other of two or three months, as her physicians and midwife judged: one was born the day after the other." If so, the smaller foetus was probably a blighted twin or fetus papyraceus. |
| Miscarriage | 25 March 1697 | | | |
| Miscarriage | early December 1697 | | | According to Saunière de L'Hermitage, the Dutch resident in London, Anne miscarried twins who were "too early to determine their sex". Other sources say the pregnancy ended in a stillborn son, or "two male children, at least as far as could be recognised". |
| Stillborn son | 15 September 1698; Windsor Castle | | St George's Chapel, Windsor Castle | James Vernon wrote to Charles Talbot, 1st Duke of Shrewsbury, that Anne's physician thought the foetus "might have been dead 8 or 10 days". |
| Stillborn son | 24 January 1700; St James's | | Westminster Abbey | Contemporary sources say Anne gave birth at seven and a half months, after the foetus had been dead for a month. |

== Genealogical table ==
The British monarchs of the House of Stuart, their relations, and the transition to the Hanovers

James V 1512–1542 r. 1513–1542 | Christian III of Denmark; 1503–1559
Mary, Queen of Scots; 1542–1587 r. 1542–1567 | Frederick II of Denmark; 1534–1588 | Dorothea of Denmark; 1546–1617
James VI and I 1566–1625 r. 1567/1603–1625 | Anne of Denmark; 1574–1619 | George, Duke of Brunswick-Calenberg; 1582–1641
Henrietta Maria of France; 1609–1669 | Charles I 1600–1649 r. 1625–1649 | Elizabeth Stuart, Queen of Bohemia; 1596–1662
HANOVER
Charles II; 1630–1685 r. 1660–1685 | Mary, Princess Royal and Princess of Orange; 1631–1660 | Anne Hyde; 1637–1671 | James II and VII; 1633–1701 r. 1685–1688 | Mary of Modena; 1658–1718 | Sophia of Hanover; 1630–1714 | Ernest Augustus, Elector of Hanover; 1629–1698
James Scott, Duke of Monmouth (illegitimate); 1649–1685 | William III; 1650–1702 r. 1689–1702 | Mary II; 1662–1694 r. 1689–1694 | Anne; 1665–1714 r. 1702–1714 | James Francis Edward Stuart "the Old Pretender"; 1688–1766 | Louisa Maria Stuart; 1692–1712 | George I 1660–1727 r. 1714–1727
(no children) | Prince William, Duke of Gloucester; 1689–1700 | Charles Edward Stuart "the Young Pretender"; 1720–1788 | Henry Benedict Stuart "Cardinal Duke of York"; 1725–1807 | George II; 1683–1760 r. 1727–1760

== See also ==
- Early-18th-century Whig plots
- Queen Anne's Bounty, 1704 financial scheme in support of poorer clergy
- Queen Anne's Revenge, 18th-century pirate ship

== Notes ==
Anne House of Stuart Born: 6 February 1665 Died: 1 August 1714
Regnal titles
| Preceded by William III & II | Queen of England and Scotland; 1702–1707 | Acts of Union 1707 |
| Preceded by William III & II | Queen of Ireland; 1702–1714 | Succeeded by George I |
| Acts of Union 1707 | Queen of Great Britain; 1707–1714 | Succeeded by George I |
Political offices
| Preceded by Prince George of Denmark | Lord High Admiral; 1708 | Succeeded by The Earl of Pembroke |
