= Henry Deacon =

Henry Deacon may refer to:

- Henry Deacon (Eureka), a character in the American science fiction series Eureka
- Henry Deacon (cricketer) (1809–1854), English cricketer
- Henry Deacon (industrialist) (1822–1876), founded a chemical business in Widnes, England
