= Frances Potter =

Frances Potter may refer to:

- Frances Potter (born 1974), member of Vanilla (band)
- Frances Elizabeth Potter, the first woman in the UK to qualify as a pharmacist
- Frances Squire Potter, American academic and activist
