= Otto Fredrik Peterson =

Swedish goldsmith and artist

Otto Fredrik Peterson (c. 1672 – September 1729) was a Swedish artist and goldsmith who specialised in miniature and enamel painting.

Peterson was born in Stockholm. He settled in London in 1709. There he was apprenticed to Charles Boit who had been born in Stockholm to French parents.

Peterson died in London.

== Gallery ==
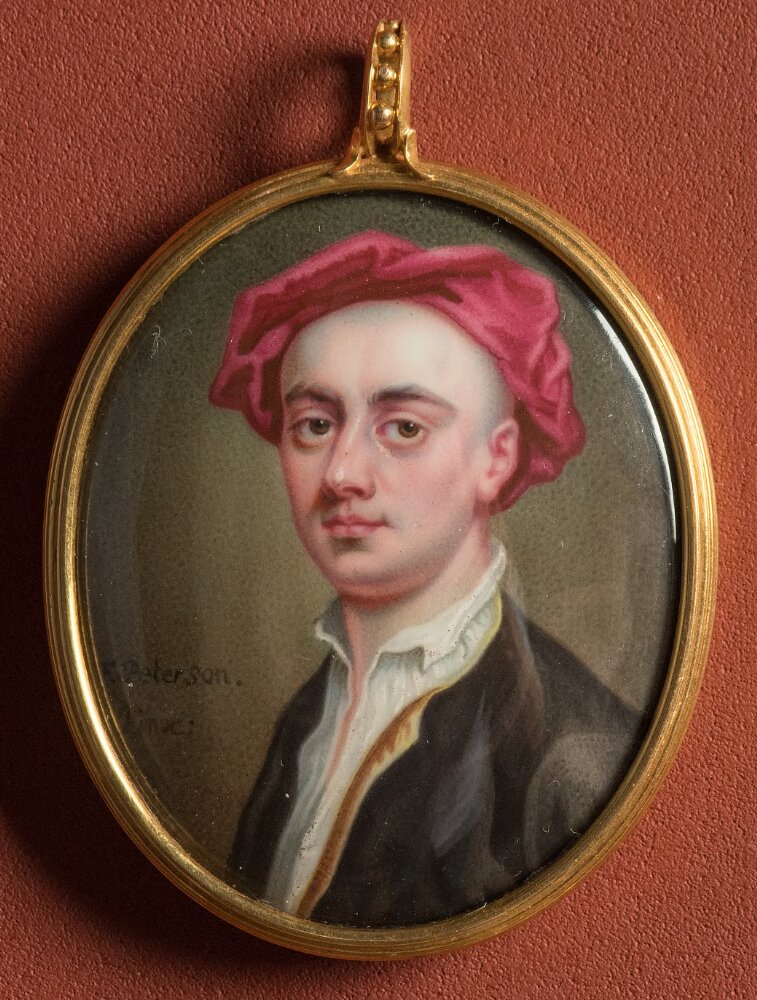
