= Christian Friedrich Zincke =

German painter

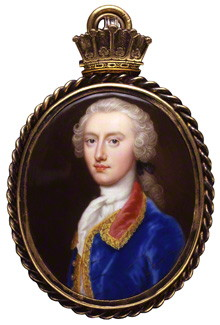
William Nassau (1758) by Christian Friedrich Zincke

Christian Friedrich Zincke (c.1683–5 – 24 March 1767) was a German miniature painter active in England in the 18th century.

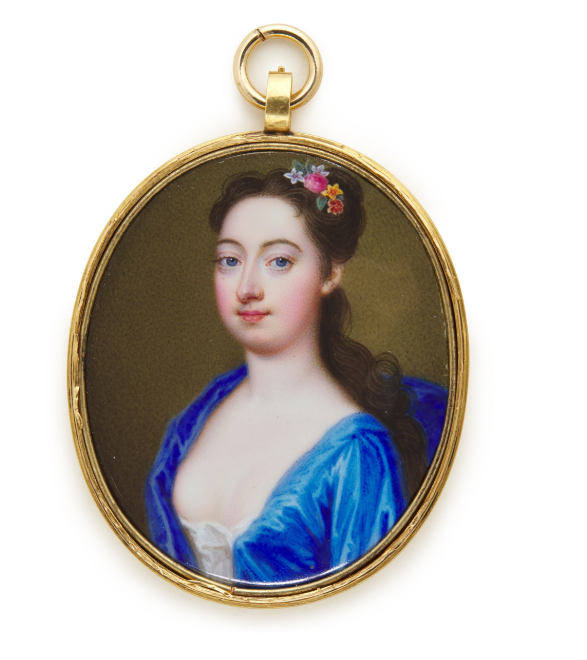
An unknown lady previously identified as Lady Ennismore (c. 1720) by Christian Friedrich Zincke

== Life ==
He was born in Dresden, Germany around 1683 and died in Lambeth, London on 24 March 1767. He apprenticed his father and also studied painting. In 1706 he came to London to work at Charles Boit's studio, and when Boit left for France eight years later Zincke inherited many of his fashionable clients. He went on to become the most successful enamel painter of his era.

Suffering from poor eyesight in the later 1740s, he passed on his business to James Deacon.

== Painting techniques ==
Zincke painted using existing portraits for reference, but also painted from life. To create skin tones he used a stipple technique of tiny red dots, sometimes described as 'measles'.

== Bibliography ==
- "Queen Caroline". Metalwork. Victoria and Albert Museum.
