= Alexander van Gaelen =

Dutch painter

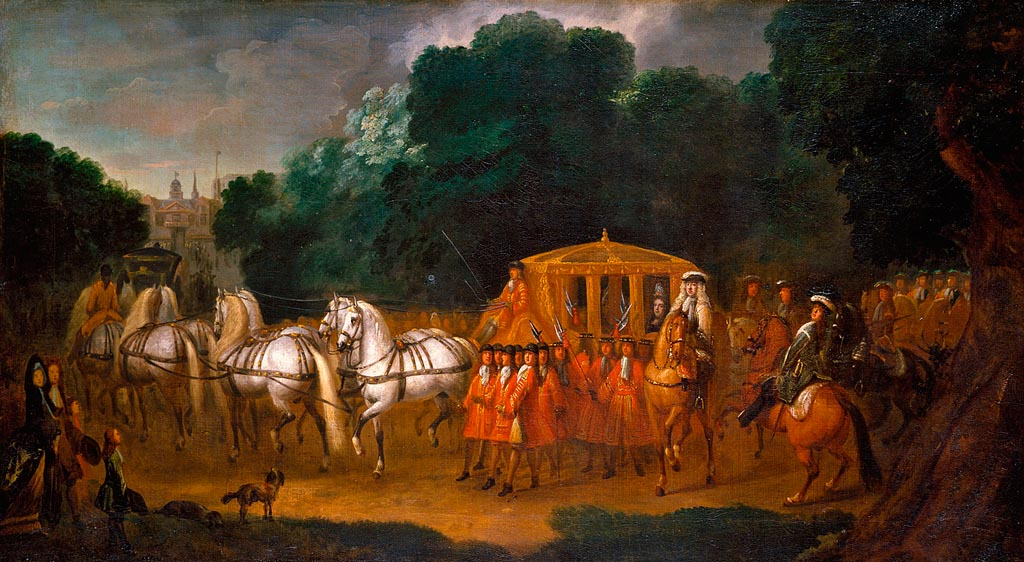
Queen Anne's Procession to the Houses of Parliament by Alexander van Gaelen

Alexander van Gaelen (1670–1728) was a Dutch painter known especially for battle scenes.

He was born in Amsterdam, was the scholar of Jan van Huchtenburgh, and, like his master, painted battles and subjects of the chase, which he treated with great fire and spirit. Whilst he was a pupil of Huchtenburgh, he had an opportunity of improving his touch by copying the works of Wouwerman, Berchem, and other eminent masters, as his instructor was a dealer in pictures as well as a painter; and he was perhaps more indebted to this circumstance, than to the lessons of Huchtenburgh. He soon found himself able to dispense with further instruction, and, resolving on visiting other countries in search of improvement, went to Germany, where he passed some time at Cologne, in the employment of the Elector.

After a few years passed in Germany he returned to Holland, where, not meeting with the encouragement he expected, he did not long remain, but determined to visit England, whither some of his pictures had preceded him. He arrived there during the reign of Queen Anne, and is said to have painted a picture of Her Majesty in a coach drawn by eight horses, and attended by several of the nobility. He also painted three pictures, representing two of the principal battles between the Royal Army and that of the Commonwealth in the time of Charles I, and the Battle of the Boyne. No mention, however, is made of Van Gaelen in Walpole's Anecdotes. He died in 1728.
