= Pudentiana Deacon =

British nun 1576–1645

Dame Pudentiana Deacon
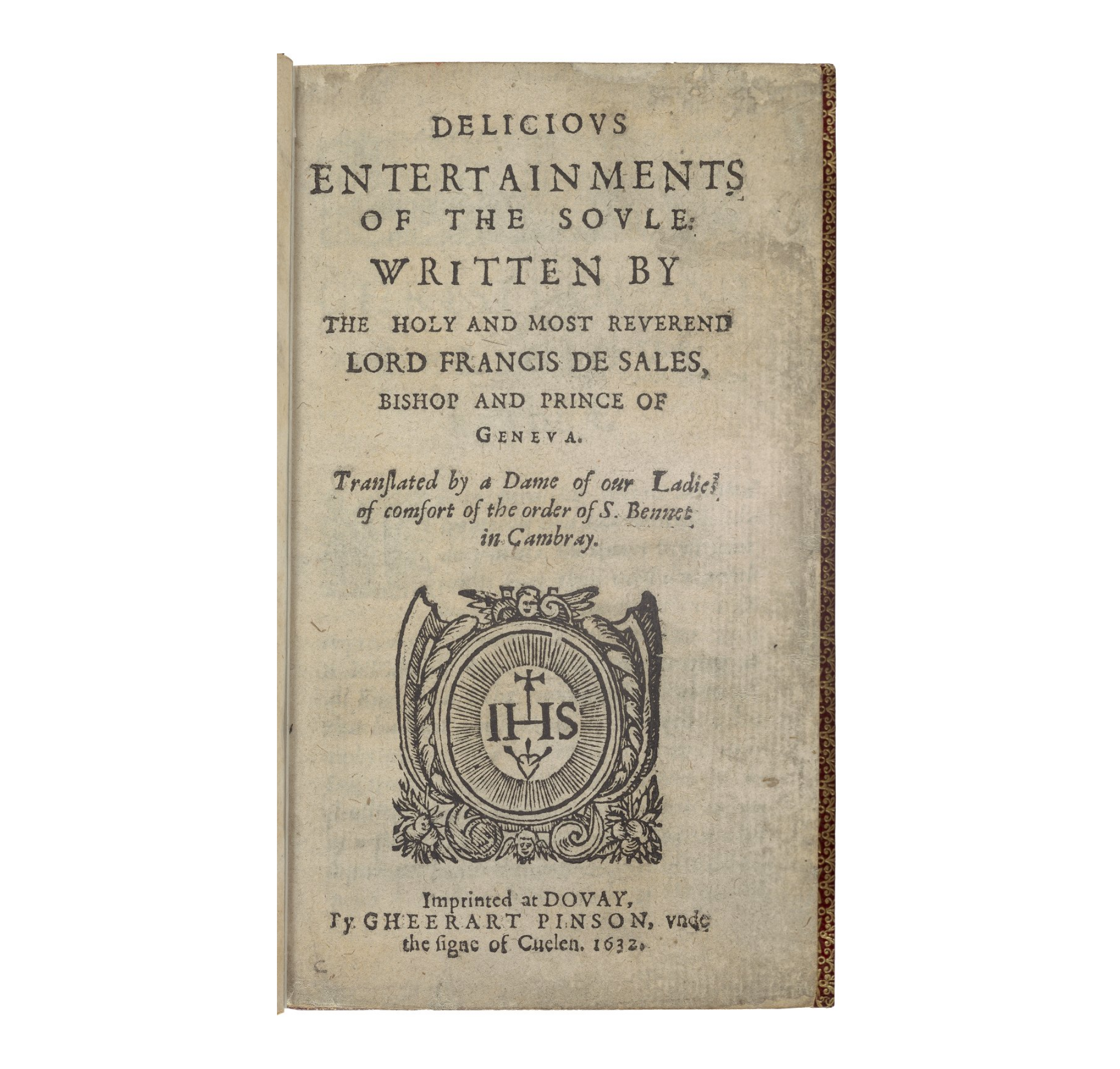
- Title page of Pudentiana Deacon's Delicious Entertainments of the Soule, 1632 (LUNA: Folger)
- Born: Elizabeth Deacon c. 1580; Middlesex
- Died: 21 Dec. 1645
- Occupations: Benedictine nun; translator
- Relatives: John Deacon (father; died 1618)
- Writing career
- Language: English
- Notable work: Delicious Entertainments of the Soule (1632)

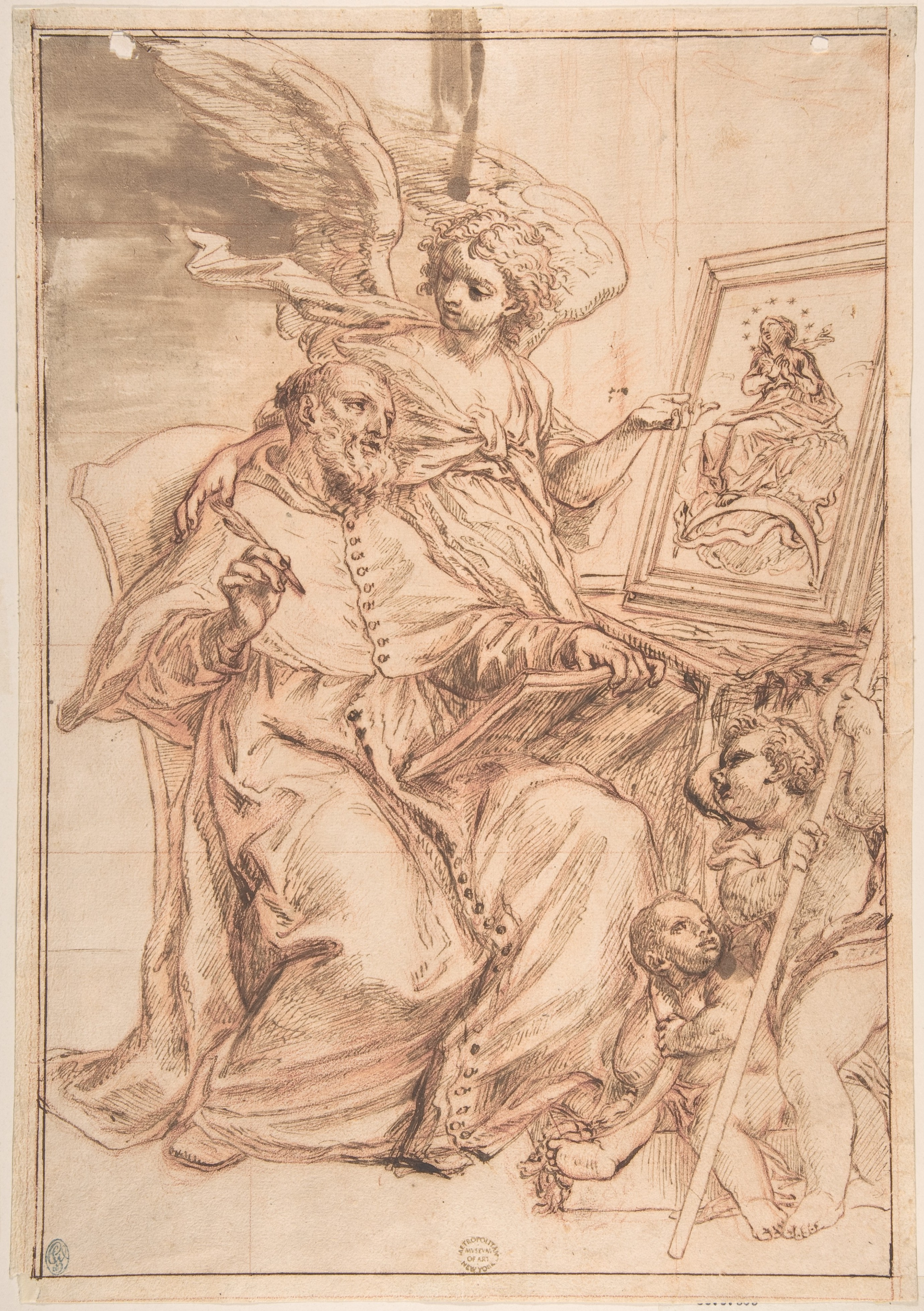
Saint Francis de Sales (canonized 1665), drawing, anonymous, Italian, Roman-Bolognese, 17th century (MET, 80.3.505)

Pudentiana Deacon (born Elizabeth; c. 1580 – 21 December 1645) was an English Benedictine nun now known for her translation of Les vrais entretiens spirituels ("the authentic spiritual conferences") by Francis de Sales (1557–1662).

== Life ==
The few details known about Deacon's life are taken from two separate manuscripts. From circumstantial evidence, her family would seem to have been Catholic, and of the gentry.

After Henry VIII dissolved the monasteries in 1535–1540, English Catholics had to travel to Europe in order to take orders, and Pudentiana Deacon journeyed to Flanders. Her father, John Deacon (died 1618), took religious orders after he was widowed, possibly inspired by his daughter's example.

Deacon was received into the Abbey of the Glorious Assumption of Our Lady in Brussels on 11 July 1606, invested in holy habit on 23 April 1607, and professed on 29 April 1608 alongside four other English women. There is some confusion about her date of birth, as records of these events indicate that she was thirty-two though she must only have been twenty-seven or twenty-eight if the age recorded at her death is accurate. She took Pudentiana as her religious name.

In 1623 she and two other women were sent to help with a new English Benedictine congregation for women being set up in Cambrai, Our Blessed Lady of Consolation. Gertrude More, great-great-granddaughter of Thomas More, was one of the postulants at the new convent. The transfer would seem to have been at least partially political, as the three sisters were identified with a "pro-Jesuit" Ignatian tendency within the Brussels house. Deacon remained in Cambrai for the rest of her life and served as cellarer, mistress of the novices, and prioress.

The convent became "renowned for its translation work and for its manuscript and book collection." Deacon translated Francis de Sales's Les vrais entretiens spirituels ("the authentic spiritual conferences") from the original French. The Conferences were a series of "familiar conversations" conducted by Sales with members of the Sisters of the Visitation, an enclosed Catholic religious order he and Jane Frances de Chantal had established in 1610, an order without external vows, open to older women and those with less robust health, focused on the virtues of "humility and gentleness." Sales did not formally author the manuscript; it is a collection of verbatim transcriptions by attendees at the conferences. Deacon's translation was published as Delicious Entertainments of the Soule in 1632. On the title page, the translator is identified only as "a Dame of our Ladies of comfort of the order of S. Bennet in Cambray." The translation had been provisionally attributed to another sister at the convent, Agnes More, but subsequent identification in a manuscript catalogue makes Deacon's authorship appear "unequivocal and decisive". One commentator speculates that "De Sales's treatise may have attracted her because it directly addresses sisters for their spiritual direction and education through contemplation," but another has raised the possibility that the choice of Sales's practical text may have been Deacon's attempt "to publicly distance her house from its association with the divisive mysticism of Augustine Baker," the director of the house, although hers was the position of "a minority faction."

One contemporary source indicates Deacon made at least one other translation, of The Mantle of the Spouse, but if she did, the work has not survived and does not appear to have been printed.

There was only one edition of Delicious Entertainments printed, and seventeen copies remain extant. Little known for centuries, Deacon's translation was reissued in a new facsimile edition in 2002. Her writing is being considered within a wider critical reassessment of religious works by women in the early modern period.

== Works ==
- Translator. Delicious Entertainments of the Soule: Written By the Holy and Most Reverend Lord Francis De Sales, Bishop and Prince of Geneva. Translated by a Dame of our Ladies of comfort of the order of S. Bennet in Cambray. Imprinted at Douay By Gheerart Pinson, under the signne of Cuelen, 1632.

== Etexts ==
- Delicious Entertainments of the Soule: Written By the Holy and Most Reverend Lord Francis De Sales, Bishop and Prince of Geneva. Translated by a Dame of our Ladies of comfort of the order of S. Bennet in Cambray. Imprinted at Douay By Gheerart Pinson, under the signne of Cuelen, 1632. (Digitization); (Transcription)

== See also ==
- Benedictines
- English Benedictine Congregation
- Francis de Sales
- Gertrude More
- Order of the Visitation of Holy Mary
- Pudentiana

== Resources ==
- Anon. Chronicle of the First Monastery Founded at Brussels for English Benedictine Nuns, A.D. 1597. Saint Mary's Abbey, Bergholt, 1898.
- Aughterson, Kate. "Deacon, Pudentiana (1580/81?–1645), Benedictine nun and translator." Oxford Dictionary of National Biography. 03. Oxford University Press. Date of access 14 Aug. 2022, <https://www-oxforddnb-com.wikipedialibrary.idm.oclc.org/view/10.1093/ref:odnb/9780198614128.001.0001/odnb-9780198614128-e-68048>
- Blom, Frans, and Jos Blom. "Introductory Note". Pudentiana Deacon, Printed Writings 1500–1640: Series I, Part Three, Volume 4. Routledge/Ashgate, 2002. ISBN 9780754604433
- Bowden, Caroline (ed.). English Convents in Exile, 1600 – 1800. 6 vols, London: Pickering & Chatto, 2012–13. ISBN 1848932154
- Goodrich, J. Chapter Four: "Anonymous Representatives: Mary Percy, Potentiana Deacon, and Monastic Spirituality." Faithful Translators: Authorship, Gender, and Religion in Early Modern England. Northwestern University Press, 2014, pp. 145–184. https://doi.org/10.2307/j.ctv3znxvx.9
- Goodrich, J. Writing Habits: Historicism, Philosophy, and English Benedictine Convents. University of Alabama Press, 2021. ISBN 0817321039
- Lux-Sterritt, Laurence. English Benedictine nuns in exile in the seventeenth century: living spirituality. Manchester University Press, 2017. ISBN 1526110024
- Rumsey, M. J., ed. "Abbess Neville’s Annals of Five Communities of English Benedictine Nuns in Flanders 1598–1687", Catholic Record Society. Misc. V, vol. 6 (1909), pp. 1–72.
- Walker, Claire. "11. Spiritual Property: The English Benedictine Nuns of Cambrai and the Dispute over the Baker Manuscripts." Women, Property, and the Letters of the Law in Early Modern England. University of Toronto Press, 2016. 237–255.
- Wolfe, Heather. "Reading bells and loose papers: reading and writing practices of the English Benedictine nuns of Cambrai and Paris." Early Modern Women’s Manuscript Writing (2004): 135–56.
