= Charles Boit =

Swedish painter (1662–1727)

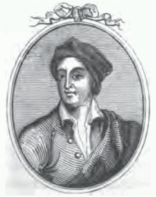
This copperplate engraving by Alexander Bannerman, printed in Walpole's Anecdotes, is the only known portrait of the portrait painter Boit.

Charles Boit (10 August 1662, in Stockholm – 6 February 1727, in Paris) was a Swedish painter in vitreous enamels who mostly worked in England, Austria and France.

== Biography ==
Boit was born in a Huguenot family in Stockholm, the son of a merchant who was also master of the royal indoor tennis court. He became a goldsmith's apprentice at the age of fifteen. After qualifying as a journeyman in 1682, he went to Paris for three months before returning to Sweden, settling in Gothenburg and getting married. According to Swedish art historian Gunnar W. Lundberg, he probably studied in Sweden with Pierre Signac, who had come from France in the mid-17th century and served as court enameller to Queen Christina.

He first travelled to England in 1687. Lack of means forced Boit to take a position as a drawing master for children in the country; according to a story retold in the Anecdotes of Painting in England of Horace Walpole, based on the notes of George Vertue, he "engaged one of the scholars, a gentleman's daughter, to marry him, but the affair being discovered, Boit was thrown into prison". According to the Anecdotes, Boit remained in confinement for two years. Once free, he was able to establish himself as an enameller in London, aided by his countryman, the popular Swedish-born portrait painter Michael Dahl, to whom he probably owed a large part of his immediate and considerable success as a painter of miniature portraits. Boit was appointed court enameller to William III in March 1696.

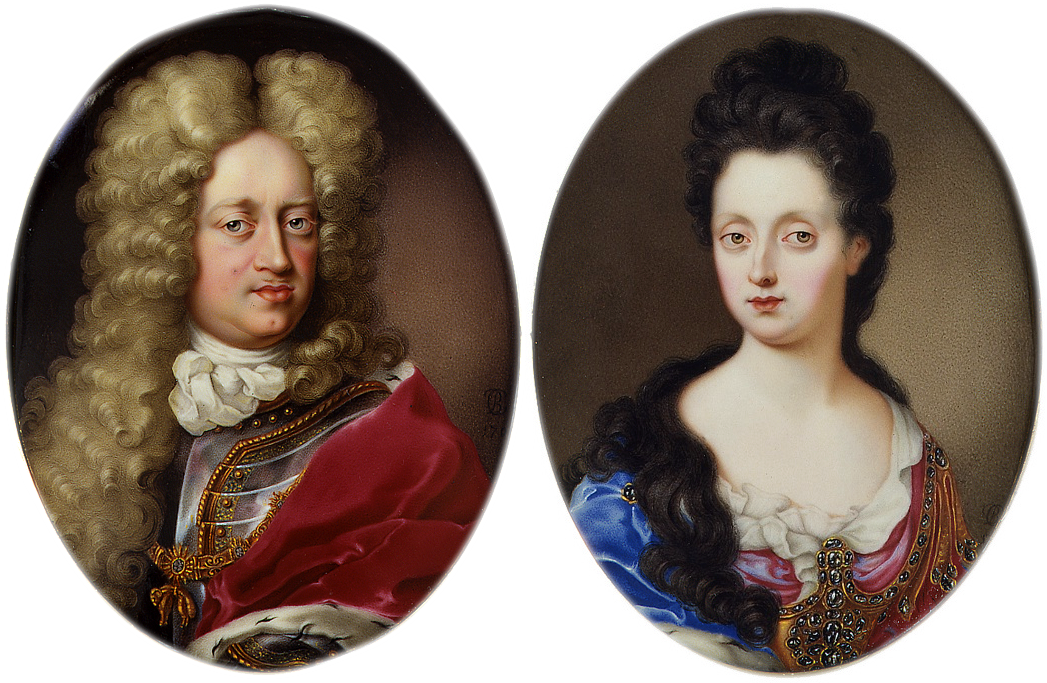
A pair of miniatures of Johann Wilhelm, Elector Palatine and his second spouse Anna Maria Luisa de' Medici, painted by Boit in 1700 during his stay in Düsseldorf (Bayerisches Nationalmuseum, Munich)

In 1699 Boit left England for Holland and Düsseldorf, where he produced work for the family of the Elector Palatine, and continued to Vienna. He painted a very large enamel portrait of Emperor Leopold and his family (1703) for which he is said to have received 6,000 ducats or 20,000 florins. The painting, 38 x 46 cm in size and now in the Kunsthistorisches Museum (Vienna), is said to have cracked after one of the Imperial princes sat down on it.

Boit returned to England in 1704, and was to continue in his path of success for a few more years. Walpole (who does not mention the excursion to the continent) remarks that Boit's prices "are not to be believed". He is said to have been paid 30 guineas for a copy of Godfrey Kneller's portrait of Colonel John Seymour, "for a lady's head, not larger, double that sum, and for a few plates 500 l." "If this appears enormous", writes Walpole, introducing his next example of Boit's extraordinary prices, "what will the reader think of the following anecdote?" This enamel, which was to be even larger than that of the Imperial family, concerned a commission on which he worked for many years on behalf of Queen Anne and Prince George, an allegory over the victory at Blenheim.

He was to paint a large plate of the queen, Prince George, the principal officers and ladies of the court, and Victory introducing the Duke of Marlborough and Prince Eugene; France and Bavaria prostrate on the ground; standards, arms, trophies. The size of the plate to be from 24 to 22 inches high, by 16 to 18 inches wide. Laguerre actually painted the design for it in oil. Prince George, who earnestly patronized the work, procured an advance of 1,000l. to Boit, who took a spot of ground in May-Fair, and erected a furnace, and built convenient rooms adjoining to work in. He made several essays before he could even lay the enameled ground, the heat necessary being so intense that it must calcine as much as in a few hours, as furnaces in glasshouses do in twenty-four hours. In these attempts he wasted seven or eight hundred pounds. In the meantime, the prince, who had often visited the operation, died. This put a stop to the work for some time; Boit, however, began to lay colours on the plate; but demanded and obtained 700l. more. This made considerable noise, during which happened the revolution at court, extending itself even to Boit's work. The graces of Marlborough were to be displaced even in the enamel, and her majesty ordered Boit to introduce Peace and Ormond, instead of Victory and Churchill. These alterations were made in the sketch, which had not been in the fire, and remained so in Peterson's hands, when he related the story to Vertue.

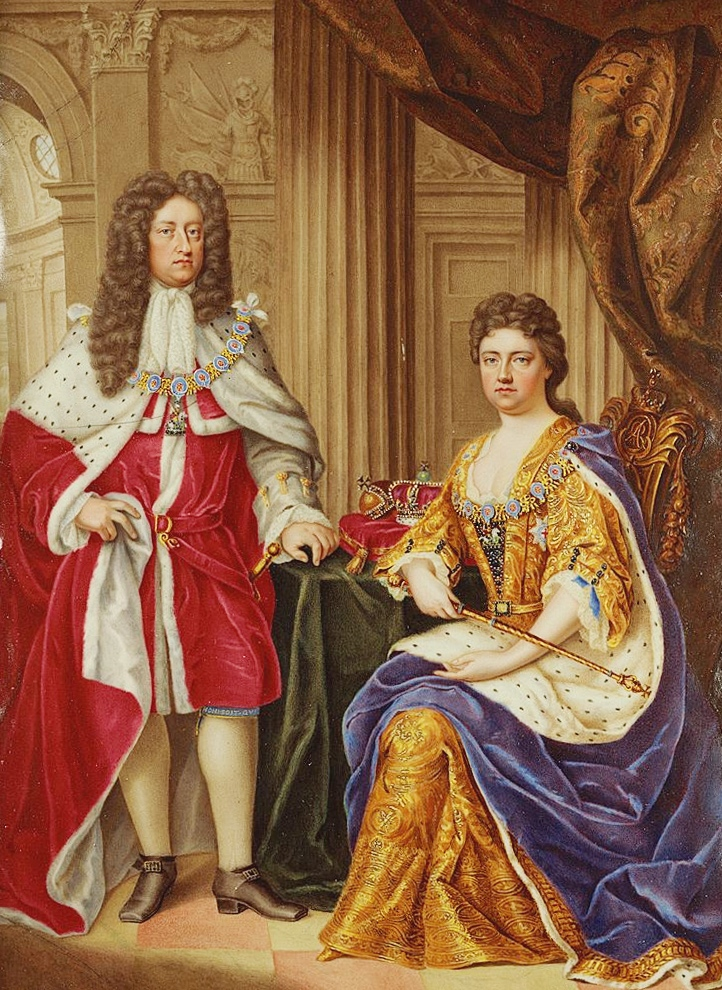
Queen Anne and Prince George, 1706 (in the Royal Collection, London)

Another large enamel, showing Queen Anne sitting and Prince George standing, is mentioned by Walpole and is in the Royal Collection.

== Years in France ==
According to Vertue, Boit "liv'd at large". At some point in 1714 or 1715, after the death of Queen Anne, his failed project for her caught up with him; asked to return the money he had been advanced, he fled to France to avoid imprisonment in the Marshalsea. He had cultivated his French contacts in the previous years and had painted a portrait (now in the Louvre) of the duc d'Aumont, the French ambassador to London, dressed in a suit of armour borrowed for the occasion from the collections of the Tower.

In Paris, Boit came under the protection of Aumont and the Regent, Philip of Orléans, to whom he gave lessons in enamel painting. Despite being a Protestant, he was elected an agrée of the Académie Royale on 6 February 1717. In August 1717, the duc d'Aumont presented him to Louis XV at a royal reception, thus giving him the opportunity to present the young monarch with an enamel portrait he had painted.

He spent some time in 1719-1720 working for Augustus of Saxony in Dresden, but lived the rest of his life in Paris. He died there on 6 February 1727, a widower and again deeply in debt, survived by his three children from his second marriage. By the time of his death, he appears to have converted to the Catholic Church and was interred at the Saint Sulpice cemetery.

Oil and enamel portraits of Boit are mentioned in the inventory made after the death of his wife, but none is known to exist today, only an engraving by Alexander Bannerman that was included in Walpole's Anecdotes.

Boit's students in England included John Milward, Otto Fredrik Peterson and Christian Friedrich Zincke. Martin van Meytens studied enamel painting with Boit in Paris in 1717 and later became a successful painter to the imperial court in Vienna.
