= Nathaniel Johnston =

English physician, political theorist and antiquary

Nathaniel Johnston M.D. (1627 – 1705) was an English physician, political theorist and antiquary.

== Life ==
He was eldest son of John Johnston (d. 1657), by Elizabeth, daughter of Henry Hobson of Usflete, Yorkshire. His father, a Scot, lived for some time at Reedness in Yorkshire, and became rector of Sutton-on-Derwent. Henry Johnston (died 1723) was another son.

Jonston proceeded M.D. from King's College, Cambridge, in 1656, having been incorporated at Cambridge M.A. in 1654 with a degree from the University of St Andrews. He was created a fellow of the Royal College of Physicians by the charter of James II, and was admitted on 12 April 1687. He practised at Pontefract, but took up the antiquities and natural history of Yorkshire.

Ralph Thoresby first made Johnston's acquaintance at Pontefract on 26 February 1682, and became a great friend and a correspondent. Johnston fell out of medical practice, moved to London in 1686, and became a High Tory pamphleteer. He lived at first at the Iron balcony in Leicester Street, next Leicester Fields. The Glorious Revolution deprived him of prospects. He died in London in 1705. He owned at the time property at and near Pontefract, sold by order of the court of chancery in 1707.

== Works ==
In 1686 Johnston published The Excellency of Monarchical Government, a folio of 490 pages, beginning with ancient history, and then discussing the royal power in England and its relation to the power of parliament. He largely followed Hobbes, and, besides much classical learning, shows considerable knowledge of English chroniclers and legal authorities. In 1687, in answer to a pamphlet of Sir William Coventry, he issued The Assurance of Abby and other Church Lands in England, the object of which is to demonstrate that even if the religious orders were restored in England, the possessors of the church lands confiscated by Henry VIII could not be disturbed. Johnston was answered by John Willes.

To defend James II's treatment of Magdalen College, Oxford, Johnston issued on 23 July 1688 The King's Visitatorial Power asserted, being an impartial Relation of the late Visitation of St. Mary Magdalen College in Oxford. In order to obtain information, he corresponded with Obadiah Walker; visited Oxford with Thomas Fairfax, and talked to Anthony Wood, but his information was mainly from the royal commissioners. In the same year he published a volume of political Enquiries, and subsequently The Dear Bargain … the State of the English Nation under the Dutch, anon.

== Legacy ==
For thirty years Johnston studied the antiquities of Yorkshire, and he left over a hundred volumes of collections, written in a very crabbed hand. Johnston borrowed from the manuscripts of Roger Dodsworth. He intended writing volumes on the model of William Dugdale's Warwickshire and Robert Plot's Natural History of Staffordshire.

Proposals for printing his notes were published without result in 1722 by his grandson, the Rev. Henry Johnston, into whose hands the collections passed. Edmund Gibson made use of them in editing William Camden's Britannia. In the Catalogi MSS. Angliæ (Oxford, 1697) was an account of 130 volumes. On Henry Johnston's death in 1755, ninety-seven volumes were purchased by Richard Frank of Campsall, Yorkshire, who allowed John Burton, to examine them when preparing his Monasticon Eboracense. These remained in the possession of Frank's descendant, B. F. Frank, and were calendared in the Historical Manuscripts Commission's 6th Report.

The surviving volumes of Johnston's writings were sold at Sothebys in 1942 to the Bodleian Library and are stored under the Nathaniel Johnston and Richard Frank collection.

== Family ==
Johnston married in 1653 Anne, daughter of Richard Cudworth of Eastfield, Yorkshire, and had four sons, and a daughter, Anne. Of the sons, the eldest, Cudworth, was a physician in York, and died before his father in 1692. Cudworth's son, Pelham Johnston, (d. 1765), graduated M.D. at Cambridge in 1728, was elected a fellow of the College of Physicians of London in 1732, practised in London, and died at Westminster 10 August 1765.

== Notes ==
Attribution

This article incorporates text from a publication now in the public domain: Lee, Sidney, ed. (1892). "Johnston, Nathaniel". Dictionary of National Biography. Vol. 30. London: Smith, Elder & Co.
