= Antony King-Deacon =

Antony Samuel King-Deacon (born Antony Samuel King; 6 December 1941 – 2005) was personal secretary to Sir Harold Nicolson, a fashion journalist for The Times, and later a gardening author and freelance journalist.

== Early life and family ==
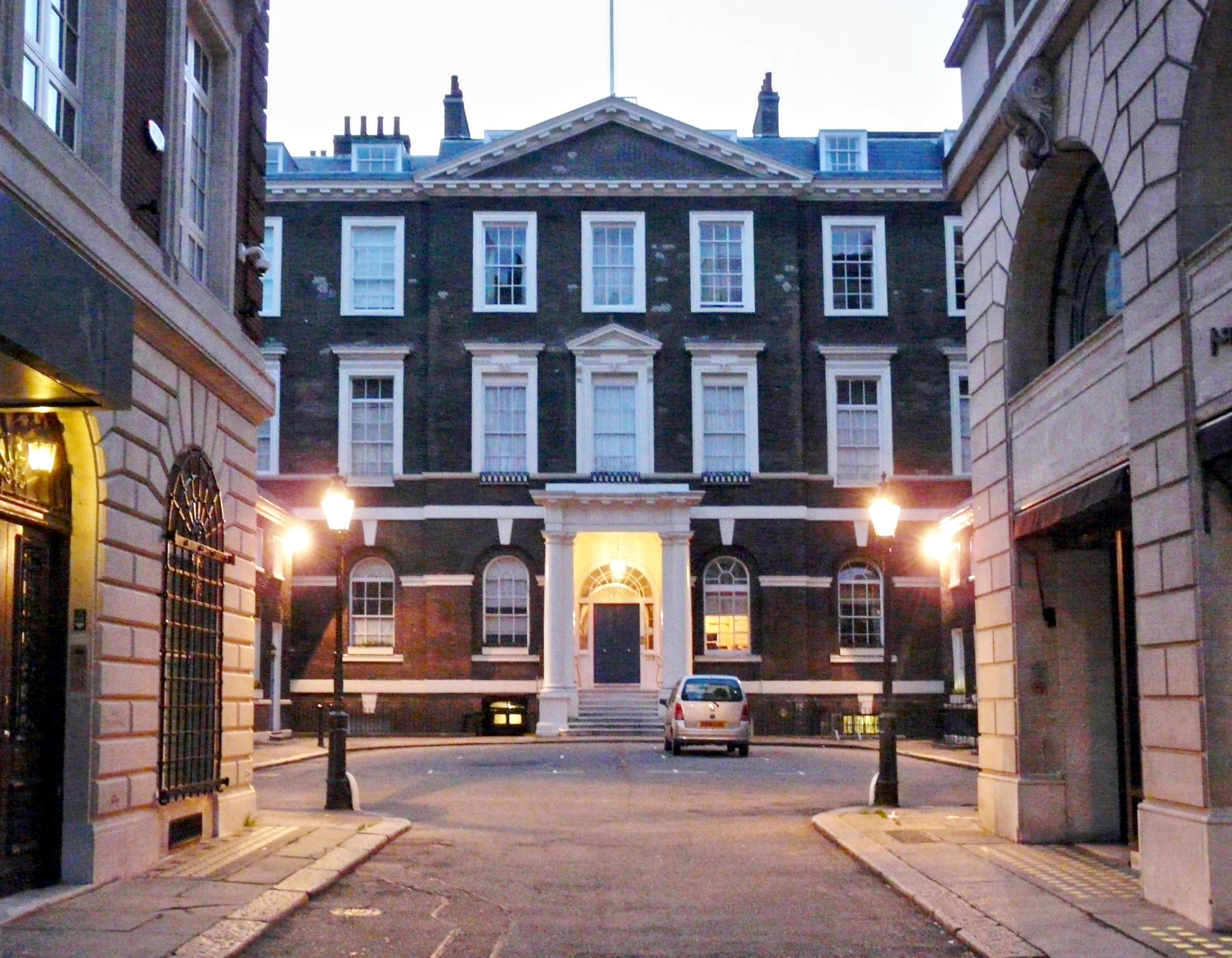
The Albany, where King-Deacon lived as a young man.

Antony King-Deacon was born Antony Samuel King on 6 December 1941. He changed his surname to King-Deacon in 1964 at which time he was living at C1, The Albany, in London's Piccadilly.

He married Elizabeth (Betty) Aldiss, sister of the science fiction writer Brian W. Aldiss, in Ealing in 1982.

== Career ==
King-Deacon's early career was as a personal secretary. He was described by The New Plantsman as "from (in his early twenties) nurse-companion to Sir Harold Nicolson at Sissinghurst Castle after the death of Vita Sackville-West". He later said that he was "probably the only man who has slept regularly in the bed of Vita Sackville-West." He subsequently became a fashion journalist for The Times in the later 1960s through to the early 1970s. He also wrote on fashion for the London Evening News, The Observer, and Harpers and Queen magazine.

He later moved into gardening and wrote for The Daily Telegraph and the gardening journal Hortus.

He produced a book of the reminiscences of the East Anglian watercolourist George Sear in 2000 and his own Book of the Garden in 2001.

== Death ==
King-Deacon died in North Walsham, Norfolk, in 2005.

== Selected publications ==
- George Sear's Norfolk as told to Antony King-Deacon. Barnwell's Print, 2000. ISBN 9780953185146
- Antony King-Deacon's Book of the Garden. Barnwell's Print, 2001. ISBN 9780953185153
