= Simon Deacon =

Australian rules footballer

Personal information
- Full name: Simon Andrew Deacon
- Born: 3 June 1954 (age 72)
- Original team: Melbourne Grammar
- Height: 183 cm (6 ft 0 in)
- Weight: 86 kg (190 lb)

Playing career^{1}
Years	Club	Games (Goals)
1974–75	St Kilda	2 (0)
- ^{1} Playing statistics correct to the end of 1975.

Simon Andrew Deacon (born 3 June 1954) is a former Australian rules footballer who played with St Kilda in the Victorian Football League (VFL).
