= James Deacon (artist) =

English miniature-painter

James Deacon (died May 1750) was an English miniature painter, known as an artist and as a musician.

In 1746 the miniature-painter Christian Friedrich Zincke was obliged to give up his house in Tavistock Street, Covent Garden, and retire from his profession due to failing eyesight. Deacon then took this house and the goodwill of the older painter's business. In the print room of the British Museum there are miniatures by him of the marine painter Samuel Scott and his wife.

He had not long been established in his profession when, attending as a witness at the Old Bailey, apparently at the 'Black Sessions,' he caught gaol fever and died in May 1750.
