= Dickie Deacon =

Scottish footballer

Personal information
- Full name: Richard Deacon
- Date of birth: 26 June 1911
- Place of birth: Glasgow, Scotland
- Date of death: 1986 (aged 74–75)
- Position: Forward

Youth career
- Alliance Juniors
- Albert Hill United
- Darlington Juniors

Senior career*
Years	Team	Apps	(Gls)
	Cockfield	-	(-)
1929–1931	Wolverhampton Wanderers	3	(1)
1932–1934	West Ham United	3	(0)
1934	Chelsea	-	(-)
1934–1935	Glenavon	-	(-)
1935–1936	Northampton Town	-	(-)
1936–1939	Lincoln City	-	(-)
- * Club domestic league appearances and goals

Richard Deacon (26 June 1911 - 1986) was a Scottish-born footballer who played as an inside left for a number of clubs in the Football League during the 1930s.

== Career ==
Deacon joined Second Division Wolverhampton Wanderers from Cockfield in 1929, along with his older brother Jimmy. His other brother John signed for Liverpool from Redcar Borough.

While his brother made over 150 appearances for Wolves, Dickie struggled to make any impact and managed just three first team games. He made his league debut on 7 March 1931 in a 0-1 defeat at Bury and played the following game, at home to Port Vale, where he scored in a 3-0 victory. His only other appearance for the club came the following month, a 1-1 draw with Bradford Park Avenue.

He joined West Ham United, but again only played three times for their first team, during the 1932-33 season. His brother John joined him at West Ham in 1934. He soon moved to fellow London side Chelsea, where he also served as trainer after retiring from playing.

He finished his playing career with spells at Glenavon, Northampton Town and Lincoln City, and also guested for Northampton during wartime.
