= Henry Deacon (cricketer) =

English cricketer and umpire

Personal information
- Full name: Henry Deacon
- Born: 25 December 1809; Leicester, Leicestershire, England
- Died: 18 August 1854 (aged 44); Leicester, Leicestershire, England
- Batting: Unknown
- Bowling: Unknown

Career statistics
Competition	First-class
Matches	5
Runs scored	32
Batting average	4.57
100s/50s	–/–
Top score	9
Balls bowled	349
Wickets	24
Bowling average	?
5 wickets in innings	2
10 wickets in match	–
Best bowling	6/?
Catches/stumpings	2/–
- Source: Cricinfo, 8 September 2019

Henry Deacon (25 December 1809 – 18 August 1854) was an English first-class cricketer and umpire.

Deacon was born at Leicester in December 1809. He made his debut in first-class cricket for the North against the Marylebone Cricket Club at Lord's in 1840. He made four further first-class appearances for the North, with his final appearance coming in 1842. Playing as a bowler, he took 24 wickets in his five first-class matches, taking five wickets in an innings on two occasions. He scored 32 with the bat, with a high score of 9. In addition to playing first-class cricket, he also played in minor matches for Leicester and Warwickshire. He stood once as an umpire in a first-class match between Nottinghamshire and Kent in 1841. Deacon died at Leicester in August 1854.
