= Frances Elizabeth Deacon =

English chemist and druggist

- Born: 17 September 1837; Kibworth Beauchamp, Leicestershire, England
- Died: 15 January 1930 (aged 92); Fleckney, Leicestershire, England
- Occupation: Pharmacist

Frances Elizabeth Deacon (née Potter) (17 September 1837 – 15 January 1930) was an English chemist and druggist who was the first woman to qualify after the 1868 Pharmacy Act, which made registration with the Pharmaceutical Society of Great Britain (PSGB) compulsory in order to work as a pharmacist.

== Early life ==
Fanny Potter was born on 17 September 1837, at Kibworth. She recorded as a "scholar at home" aged 13 at 10 Leicester Road, Kibworth Beauchamp, Leicestershire in the 1851 census. Her parents William (born in Marylebone in c.1804) and Elizabeth (born in Kibworth in c.1805) had two other children, sons James (born c.1836) and Cyrus (born c.1846), and were able to afford a live-in servant.

== Education and career ==
Fanny registered as a Chemist & Druggist on 5 February 1869, having taken the Pharmaceutical Society's Modified exam, established by the Pharmacy Act to allow assistants who had been "actually engaged and employed in the dispensing and compounding of Prescriptions" for at least three years to be placed on its Register. Her father also joined the register for the first time as a result of the Pharmacy Act, qualifying as a Chemist & Druggist under the clause that allowed those in business before 1 August 1868 to register without taking an exam.

She joined 215 female pharmacists who were included in the first compulsory Register in 1869 (1.9% of the total number of 11,638). Many had taken over businesses from their fathers or husbands, some were running a pharmacy independently. Unlike other professions including medicine, women were not excluded from taking the Pharmaceutical Society's exams alongside their male counterparts, even though the male hierarchy of the PSGB and the profession had not considered them in their drawing up of the PSGB educational scheme. However, women were not permitted to become PSGB members. They could work as pharmacists, but were not allowed to play a role in the profession's organisation or regulation.

Fanny worked as her father's assistant after registration, as she had done so before it. In the 1871 census, she is listed as "chemist" still living with her parents on Leicester Road.

== Personal life ==
Fanny married Abraham Deacon (1828–1911), a widower, in the Independent Chapel in neighbouring Kibworth Harcourt on 23 September 1875 when he was aged 46 and she was 37. He already had three daughters, Sarah, Mary and Harriet from his first marriage. The couple had a son, Augustine Henry, in around 1877. The family lived in Fleckney where Deacon is first recorded as a draper, but later as a post master. By 1881, he had founded a Strict & Particular Baptist Church at Carmel Chapel on Wolsey Lane in the village, and worked as its Minister. Local records suggest that he taught himself to read and write, and was an author and poet as well as a pastor. He opened his post office also on Wolsey Lane in Fleckney, probably in the 1880s, and Fanny worked in the same building as a Chemist & Druggist. Fanny's parents had moved to Fleckney in 1876, and some time after William's death in 1882, their step-granddaughter Harriet moved in as a companion to Fanny's widowed mother Elizabeth aged 87.

Abraham died on 16 February 1911, but Fanny is still listed as a Chemist & Druggist in the census of that year, in spite of her age of 73, with Harriet her step-daughter living with her. In fact, she stayed on the Pharmaceutical Society's Register until her death on 15 January 1930, in Fleckney, aged 92. The cause of death was reported as "Shock caused by the deceased accidentally falling downstairs on 23rd December 1929."

As the result of a public vote, on 16 June 2022, a commemorative green plaque was unveiled to Fanny Deacon in Wolsey Lane, Fleckney, where she lived and ran her own business.
