= Jimmy Deacon =

Scottish footballer

Personal information
- Date of birth: 23 January 1906
- Place of birth: Glasgow, Scotland
- Date of death: 1976 (aged 69–70)
- Height: 5 ft 7 1/2 in (1.71 m)
- Position: Forward

Senior career*
Years	Team	Apps	(Gls)
	Darlington	2	
1929–1934	Wolverhampton Wanderers	149	(52)
1934–1939	Southend United	100	(3)
1939–1940	Hartlepool		
- * Club domestic league appearances and goals

James Deacon (23 January 1906 – 1976) was a Scottish footballer, who played in the Football League.

== Career ==
Deacon began his league career with Darlington, making two appearances in the Third Division before joining Second Division Wolverhampton Wanderers in June 1929 for £250.

He scored on his Wolves debut, a 2–2 draw at Bradford City on 7 September 1929, and quickly formed a potent attack with Billy Hartill, scoring 42 goals as a duo that season. Deacon reached double figures in goals in all but his final full season at Molineux, and won a Second Division championship medal in 1931–32. His younger brother Dickie also played for the club during this spell.

He scored a total of 56 goals in 158 appearances for Wolves, before being transferred to Southend United in October 1934. He made over a century of appearances for Southend, before playing out his career with a season at Hartlepool in 1939–40.

After World War II, he returned to his native Glasgow where he ran a pub.
