= Ram tank =

Canadian medium tank

Ram, Cruiser Tank
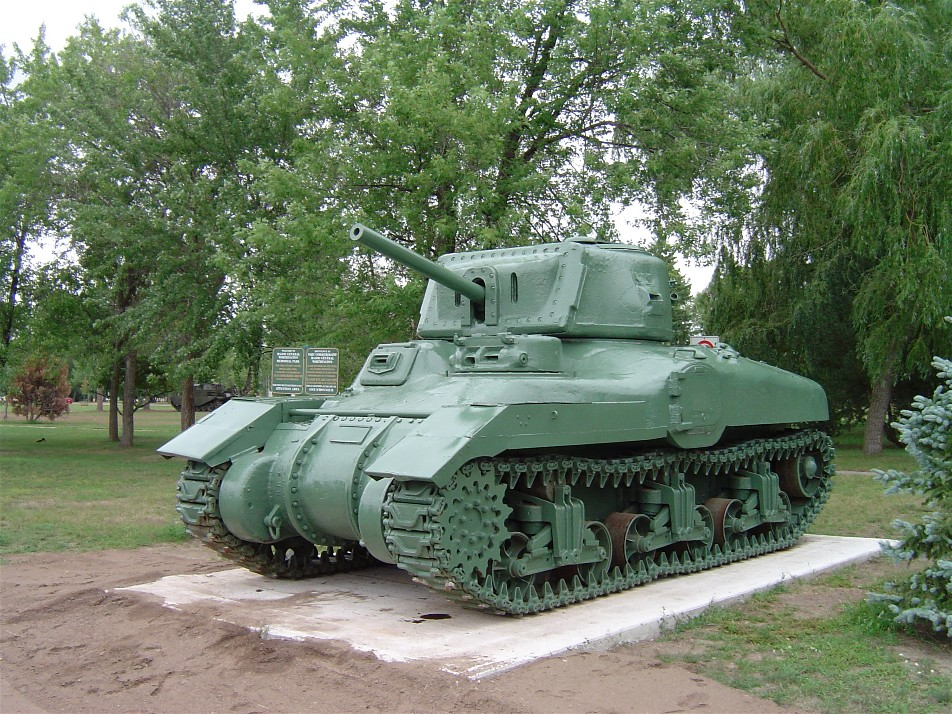
- Early production Ram Mk II at CFB Borden
- Type: Cruiser tank
- Place of origin: Canada

Service history
- Used by: Canada, Netherlands
- Wars: Second World War

Production history
- Designed: 1941
- Manufacturer: Montreal Locomotive Works
- Produced: November 1941 – July 1943
- No. built: 2,032

Specifications (Ram Mk II)
- Mass: 65,000 lb (29 t)
- Length: 19 ft (5.8 m)
- Width: 9 ft 10 in (3.00 m)
- Height: 8 ft 9 in (2.67 m)
- Crew: 5 (Commander, gunner, loader, driver, co-driver/hull gunner)
- Armour: 25–87 mm
- Main armament: QF 6 pdr Mk III; 92 rounds
- Secondary armament: 3 × .30 in (7.62 mm) machineguns (Ram I 4,715 rounds, Ram II 4,440 rounds.)
- Engine: Continental R-975 9-cyl radial gasoline engine 400 hp (298 kW)
- Power/weight: 12.3 hp/ton
- Transmission: Borg-Warner clutch, controlled differential
- Suspension: Vertical volute spring
- Operational range: 232 km (144 mi)
- Maximum speed: 25 mph (40 km/h)

The Ram was a cruiser tank designed and built by Canada in the Second World War, based on the U.S. M3 Medium tank chassis. Due to standardization on the American Sherman tank for frontline units, it was used exclusively for training purposes for the Ontario regiment and was never used in combat as a gun tank. The chassis was used for several other combat roles however, such as a flamethrower tank, observation post and armoured personnel carrier.

== Development ==
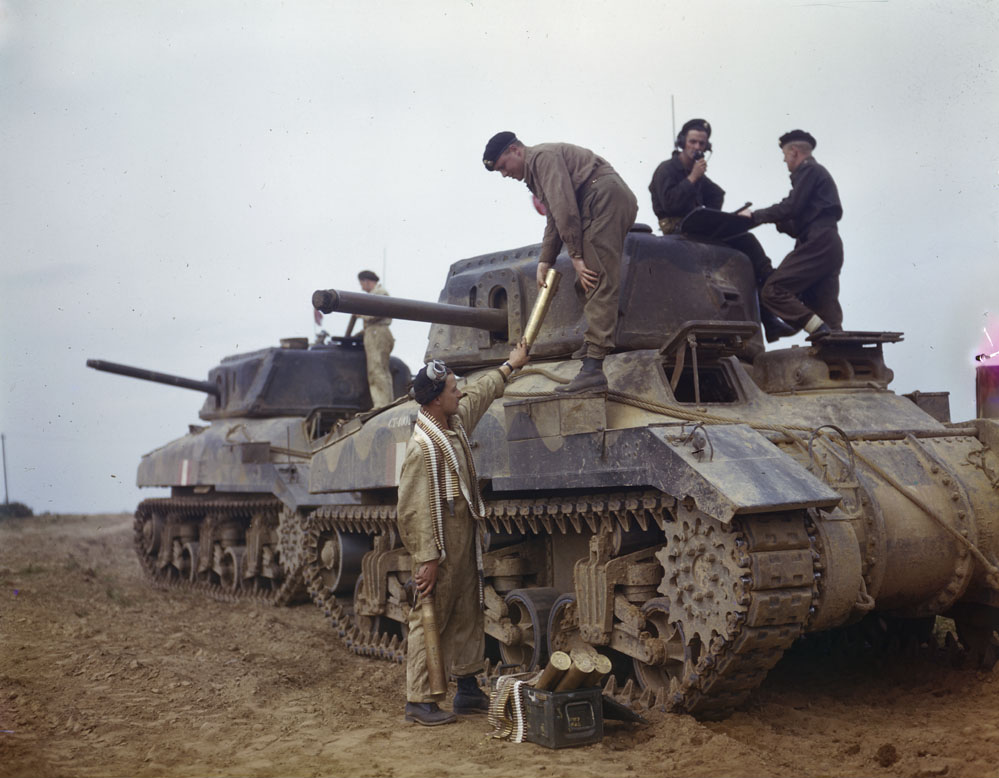
Ram Mk.II (early production) tanks during the war

Even before the loss of the majority of the United Kingdom's tank force in France in 1940 after Dunkirk, it was recognised that tank production in the UK at the start of the war was insufficient and capacity in the US was taken for British needs. So it was necessary that if Canada was to equip with tanks they would have to be manufactured locally. In June 1940 the Canadian Pacific Railway's Angus Shops in Montreal, as the only large firm with spare capacity, had received a contract to produce 300 partially fitted out Valentine tanks for the British; this was followed later with one for 488 complete tanks for Canada. However the Valentine was an infantry tank and Canada required a cruiser tank for its recently formed armoured division. In the end 1,420 Valentines were produced by CPR, most of which were supplied to the USSR. Although the Valentine used a number of American produced parts, its reliance on British components, difficulties in adapting its manufacture to North American methods, and other problems such as limitations to the availability of the right type of armour plate affected Valentine production. The Canadian Joint Committee on Tank Development concluded, in September 1940, that its cruiser tank should be based on a US rather than a British design. This would be quicker and allow it to use components already in production for the US design.

The Canadians were interested in production of the M3 Medium. However the M3 was an interim design; its main armament was in a side sponson, it was tall and under-armoured, and it was clear that it would be unsatisfactory for Canadian and British use. In early 1941 the Canadian Interdepartmental Tank Committee adopted a compromise: to develop a superior design locally but still using the M3 chassis. The British Tank Mission, which was involved in the modifications of the M3 for British use, contributed a tank expert, L.E. Carr, to design a new hull and turret for the Canadian tank which could take a 6-pounder (57 mm) or 75mm gun while retaining the lower hull of the US M3 Medium.

The new hull was cast rather than welded or riveted and lower than that of the M3. The pilot model's turret and upper hull casting was produced in the US by General Steel Castings and later they aided the set up of Canadian production. Montreal Locomotive Works (MLW) was chosen to make the new Canadian M.3 Cruiser Tank (as it was then known) and was given the funding to set up the Canadian Tank Arsenal at Longue Pointe. MLW was a subsidiary of the American Locomotive Company, which had experience in producing large castings and Alco was producing cast hulls for the M3 Medium.

Canadian engineers ran into many challenges when developing the tank as Canada had never produced a tank before. Along with the lack of knowledge, it took time for Canadian factories to gear up for the production of many of the Ram's components.

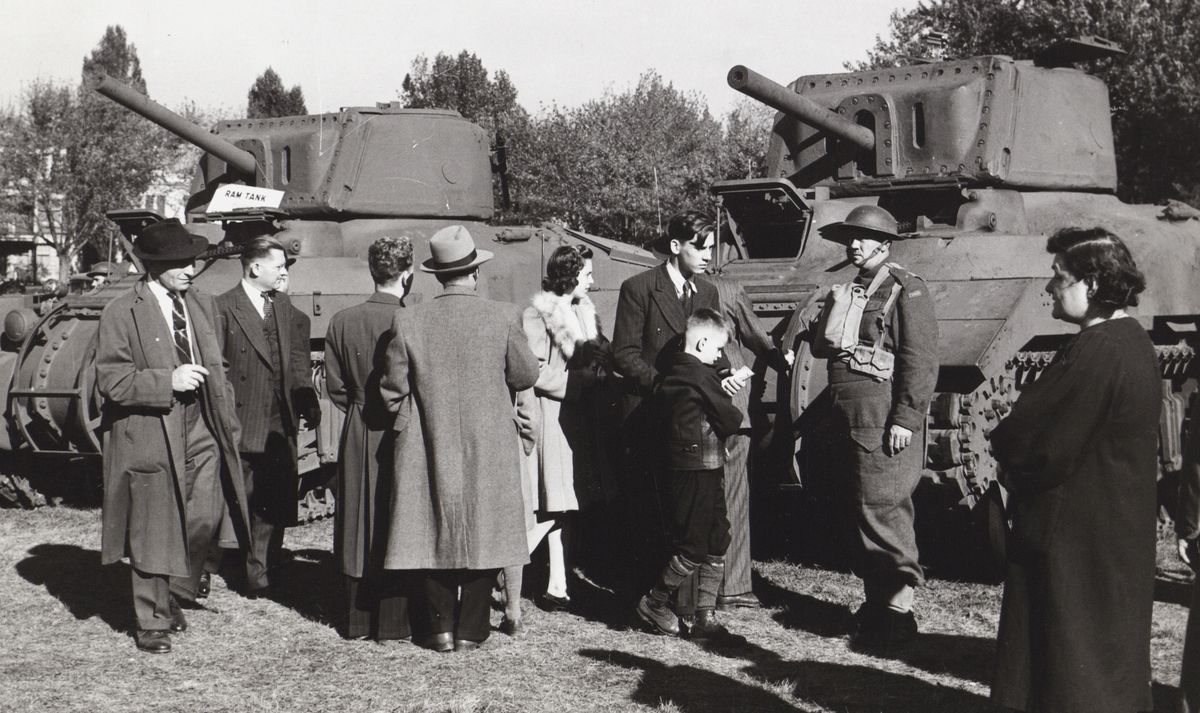
Ram tanks presented at the Parc Jeanne-Mance in Quebec, Canada

Initially Canada relied heavily on United States and British materials to complete the construction of the Ram. Most critically the Ram's Continental engine and transmissions were available only in the USA and these were always in short supply. The Ram tank was developed with a turret which unlike the US M3 could traverse the main armament 360 degrees. Its fully cast armoured steel hull gave reinforced protection and, with the driver's seat repositioned to meet British requirements for right-hand drive, lower height; while the U.S.-designed chassis and power train ensured its overall reliability.

Although it could mount a US 75 mm gun, the preferred armament for the Ram was the QF 6 pounder which had superior armour-piercing capability. As neither the 6 pounder nor the Canadian-designed mounting for it was immediately available, early production (50 tanks) were fitted with the 40 mm QF 2-pounder gun.

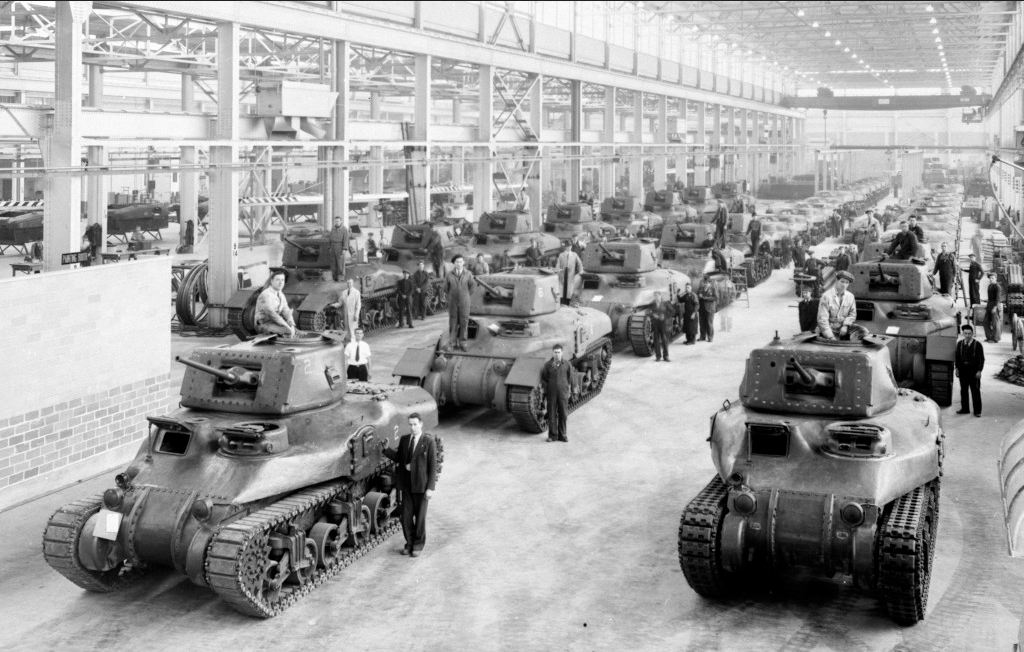
Ram tanks produced by Montreal Locomotive Works.

A prototype Ram was completed in June 1941 and general production of the Ram I began in November of the same year. The Ram I and early Ram IIs were fitted with side doors in the hull and an auxiliary machine gun turret in the front. The former weakened the hull and complicated production, and the doors and the machine gun turret were discarded in later modifications. By February 1942 production had switched to the Ram II model with a 6-pounder gun and continued until July 1943. In March 1942 a decision had been made to change production over to the automotively-similar M4A1 Sherman tank for all British and Canadian units. Ram production continued due to delay in starting the new M4 production lines and a reluctance to let the plant lie idle. By July 1943 1,948 vehicles plus 84 artillery observation post (OP) vehicles had been completed.

The official Canadian history of the war compares the Ram to the Ross rifle as examples of unsuccessful Canadian weapon designs. It states that given the Sherman's superiority, in retrospect it would probably have been better for the United States to produce more tanks, and for Canada to have focused on manufacturing more transport vehicles such as the successful Canadian Military Pattern truck designs. The Sexton self-propelled gun based on the Ram chassis, however, was very successful.

== Combat history ==
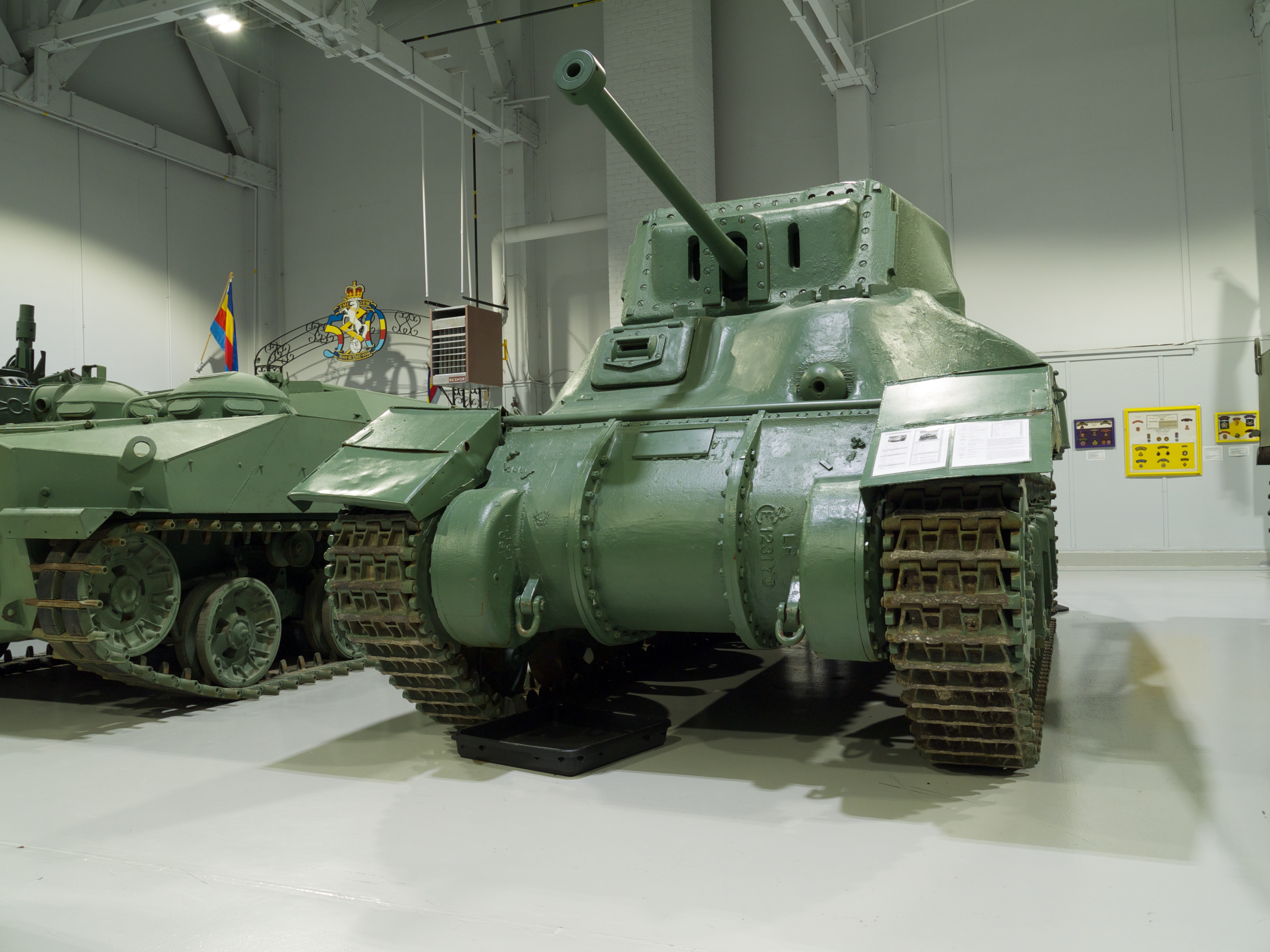
Ram Mk.II – late production

As built, the Ram was never used in combat as a tank, but was used for crew training in Canada and Great Britain up to mid 1944. The observation post vehicles and Armoured Personnel Carrier, gun tractor, and munitions carrier versions of the Ram saw considerable active service in North West Europe. These tanks were mainly rebuilt by Canadian Army workshops in the United Kingdom. Conversions of Ram tanks with the Wasp II flamethrower gear were used by the 5th Canadian Armoured Brigade in the Netherlands in 1945.

== Export ==
=== Netherlands ===
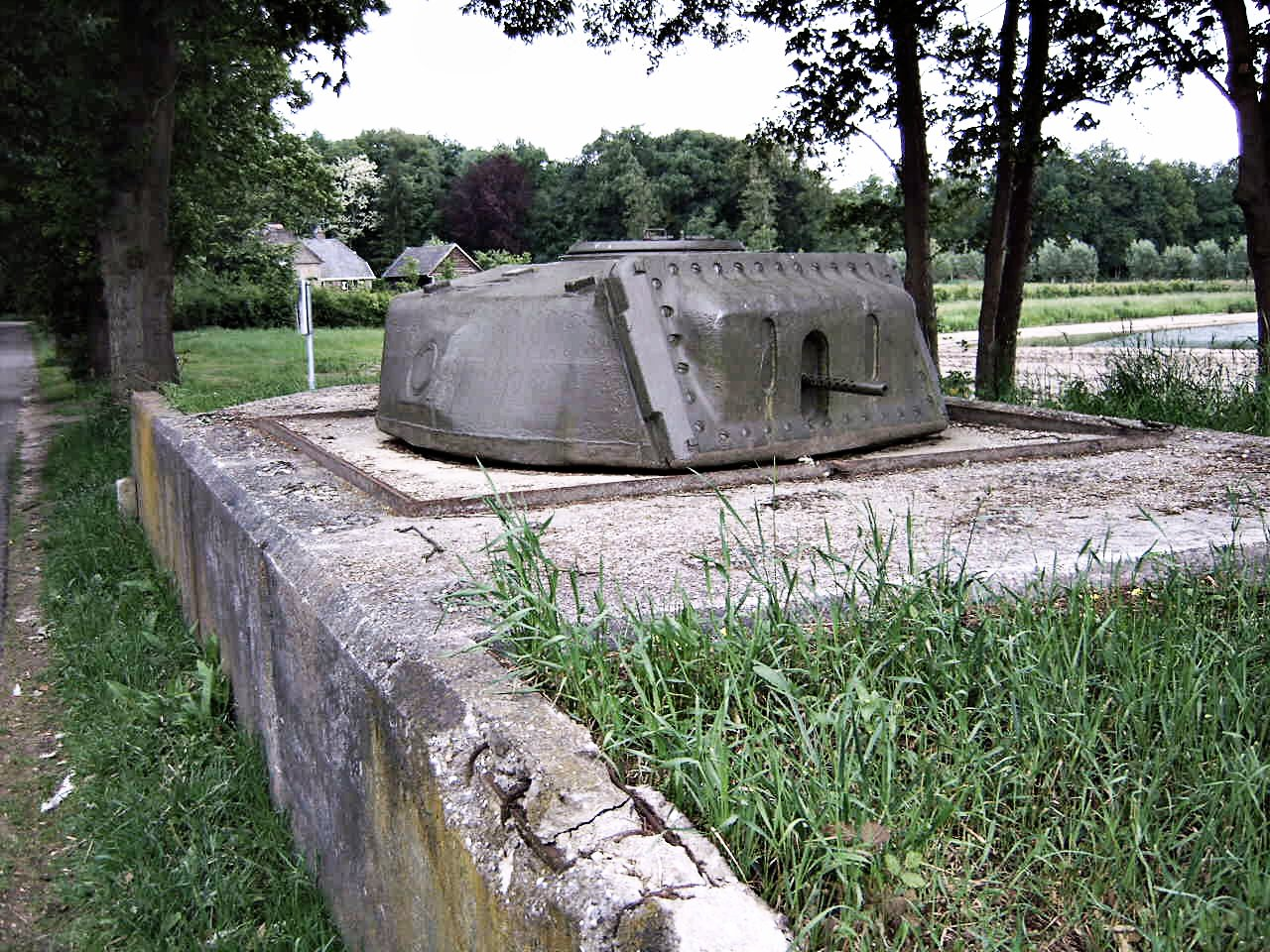
A Ram encased in the Dutch IJssel Line, still present in 2007

In 1945 the Royal Netherlands Army got permission from the Canadian government to take free possession of all Ram tanks in army dumps on Dutch territory. Those not already converted into Kangaroos were used to equip the 1st and 2nd Tank Battalion (1e en 2e Bataljon Vechtwagens), the very first Dutch tank units. These had a nominal organic strength of 53 each. However it proved to be impossible to ready enough tanks to attain this strength because the vehicles were in a very poor state of maintenance. In 1945 it was also reported that the Dutch government was negotiating the purchase of 44 Ram tanks that were stationed in England alongside the purchase of other military equipment of Canadian origin. In 1947 the UK provided 44 Ram tanks from its stocks, that were in a better condition. Forty of these had been rebuilt with the British 75 mm gun; four were OP/Command vehicles with a dummy gun. This brought the operational total for that year to just 73, including two Mark Is. In 1950 only fifty of these were listed as present. The Ram tanks were replaced, together with the Sherman tanks, by Centurion tanks beginning in 1953. Some Ram tanks were used in the 1950s as static pillboxes in the IJssel Line, their hulls dug in and embedded within two feet of concrete.

== Survivors ==
One Dutch Ram tank, an OP/Command vehicle, survives at the Dutch Cavalry Museum in Amersfoort.

A Ram tank modified as a Kangaroo serves as a memorial to the 1st Canadian Armoured Carrier Regiment in Mill, Netherlands.

Ram tanks can also be seen at the Canadian War Museum (the Kangaroo version), in Worthington Park at Canadian Forces Base Borden, in front of the Beatty Street Drill Hall in Vancouver, and at the Bovington Tank Museum (both a tank and a Kangaroo)

A Ram Tank can also be seen outside of the Armoured Trial and Development Unit based at Bovington Camp.

== Variants ==
Tank Cruiser, Ram Mk I
Ordnance QF 2 pounder / 40mm gun (171 rounds).
Tank Cruiser, Ram Mk II
Early production — QF 6 pounder Mk III (57 mm L/43) gun with 92 rounds.
Late production — QF 6 pounder Mk V (57 mm L/50) gun. Auxiliary turret and sponson door removed. Browning .303 in (7.7 mm) machine gun fitted in ball mount.
Badger
A flamethrower equipped tank. The first Badgers were Ram Kangaroos with the Wasp II flamethrowing equipment (as used on the Universal Carrier) installed in place of the bow MG. Later models were turreted Rams with the equipment in place of the main gun.
Ram Kangaroo
Ram with turret removed to give an armoured personnel carrier capable of carrying 11 battle-ready troops (or -- more often -- as many as could fit) as well as the two crew. See Kangaroo.
Ram OP/Command (84)
An armoured vehicle to function as a mobile observation posts for the Forward Observation Officers (FOO) of Sexton self-propelled gun units, based on Ram Mk II. The gun was replaced by a dummy, and two Wireless Set No. 19 radios were fitted with a No. 58 set. Crew of six. They were built from the last 84 Rams off the production line in 1943.
Ram GPO
Like OP but with special equipment for "Gun Position Officers" of self-propelled artillery regiments. Had Tannoy loudspeakers mounted.
Sexton "25-pdr, SP, Tracked"
Self-propelled artillery vehicle armed with QF 25 pounder gun in open-topped superstructure.
Ram Ammunition Carrier
Also called "Wallaby", an armoured ammunition supply vehicle, converted as for the Kangaroo but used to carried 25-pdr ammunition for Sexton.
Ram ARV Mk I
Armoured recovery vehicle created by adding winch gear added to Ram Mark I .
Ram ARV Mk II
Armoured Recovery Vehicle based on Ram Mk II. Jibs and earth spade added, turret replaced by dummy.
Ram Gun Tower
Armoured artillery tractor for use with Ordnance QF 17 pounder towed Anti-tank gun.
3in SP Ram Mk I
Proposed Canadian-built version using a Ram tank chassis – a single prototype was built in 1942.

In addition, a Ram was used in an attempt to produce a self-propelled QF 3.7 inch AA gun but got no further than testing.

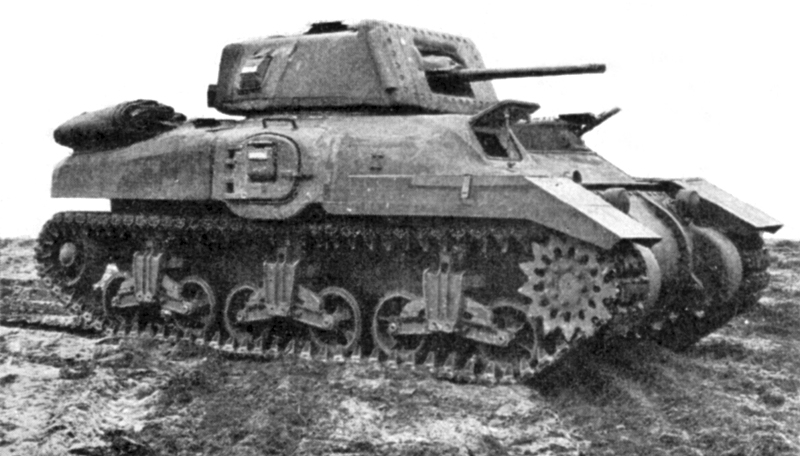
Ram Mk I

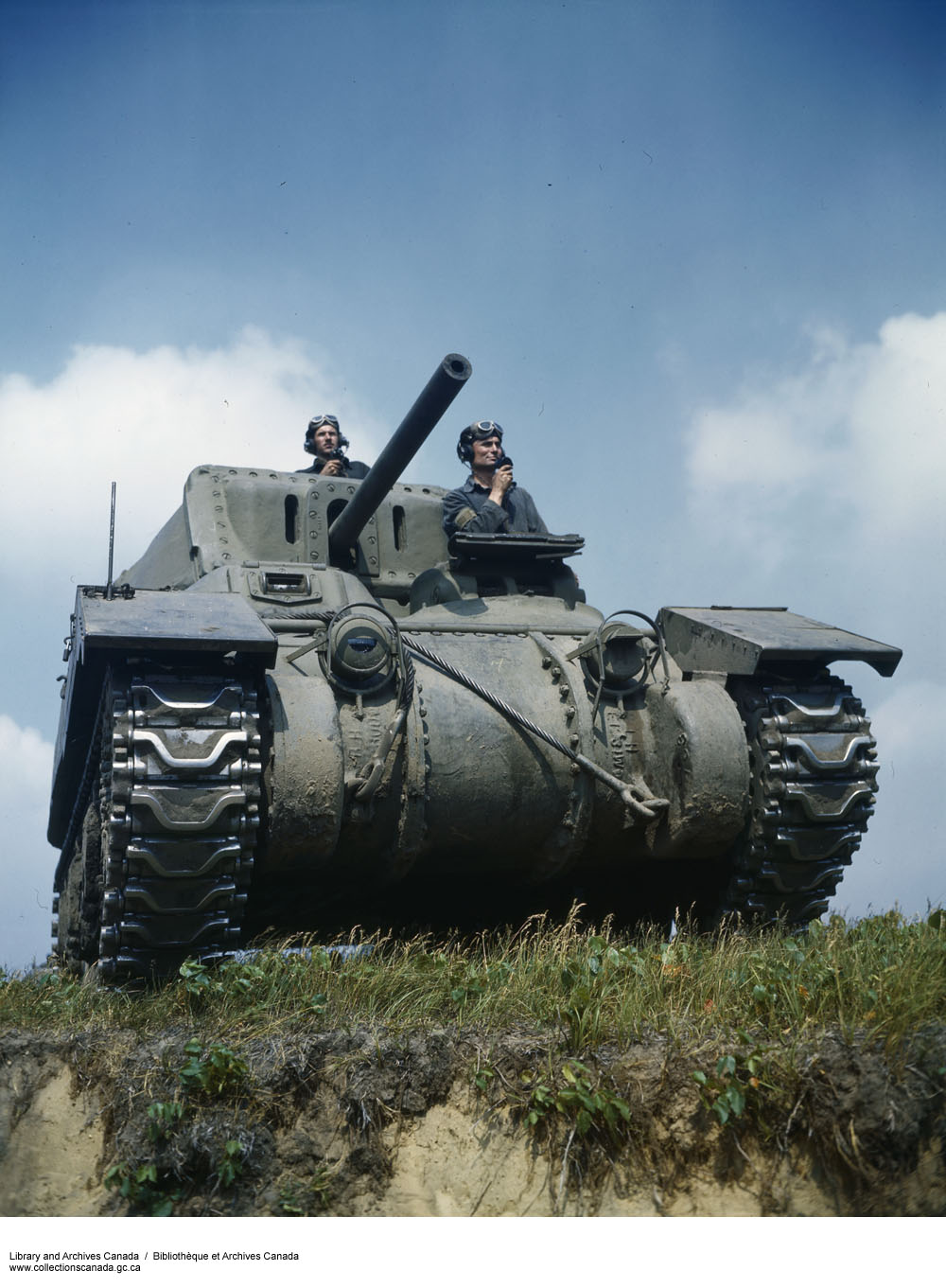
Ram Mk II – early production

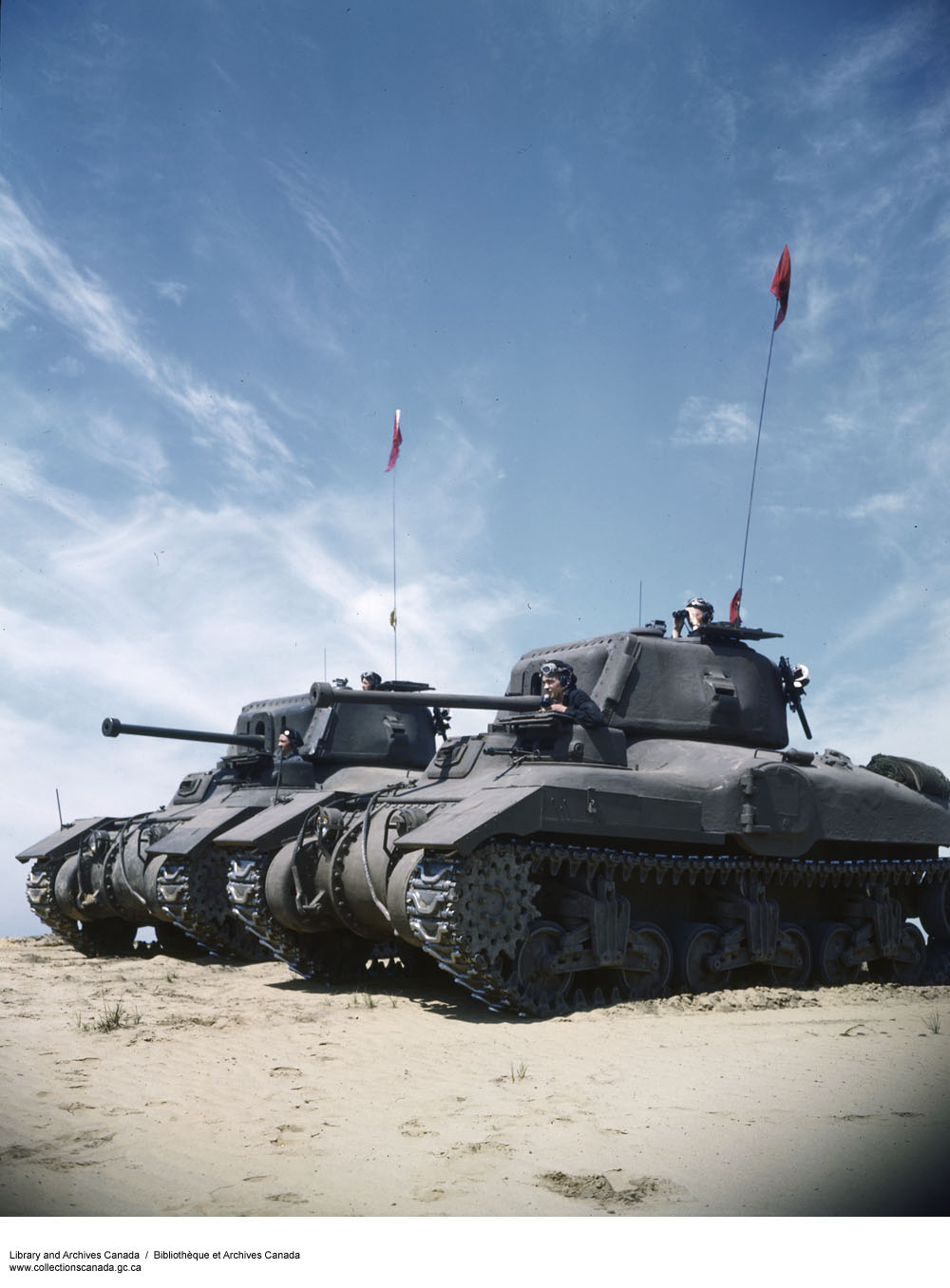
Ram Mk II – later production, with Mk III QF 6 pounder but still with auxiliary turret

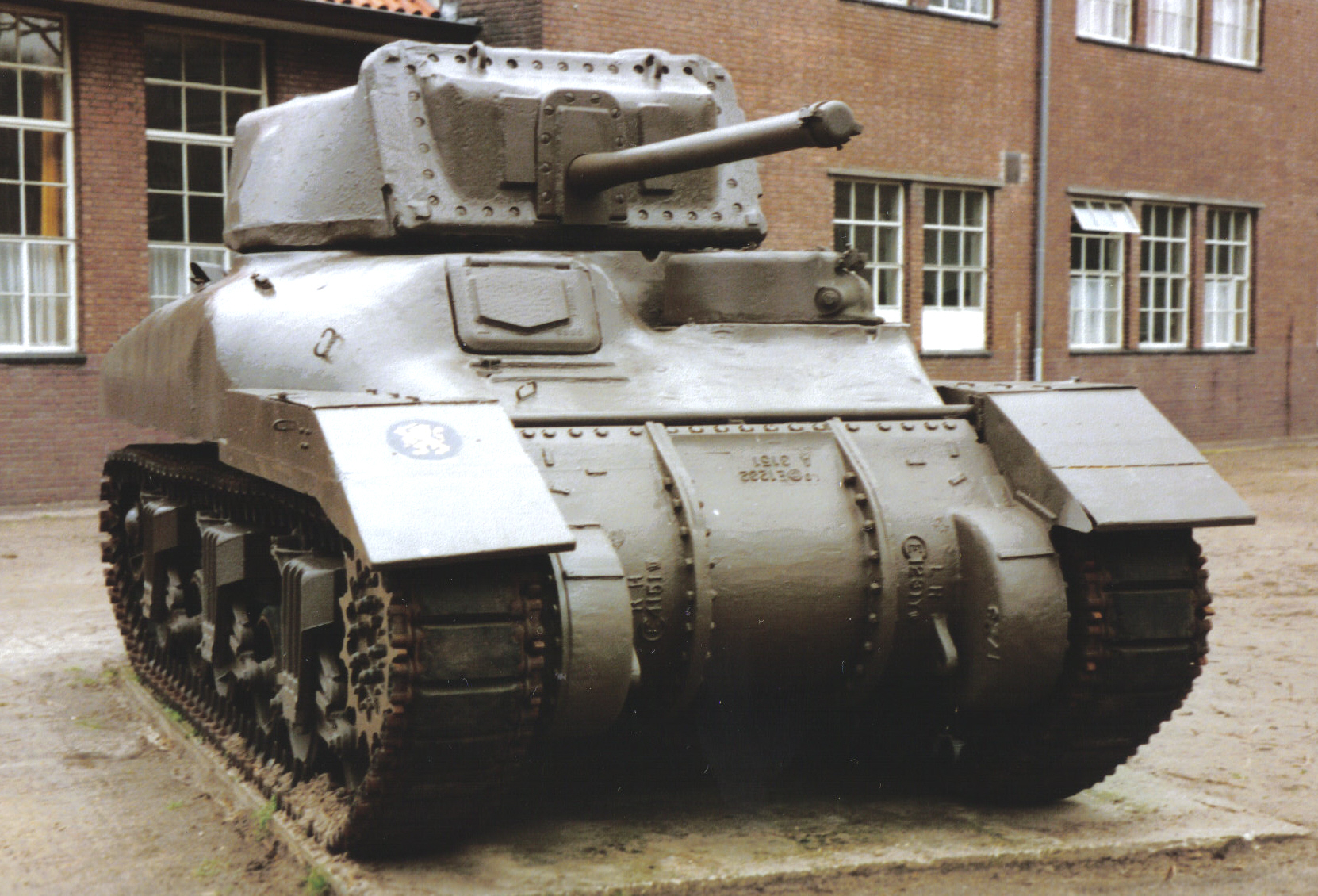
Ram OP/Command tank at Amersfoort

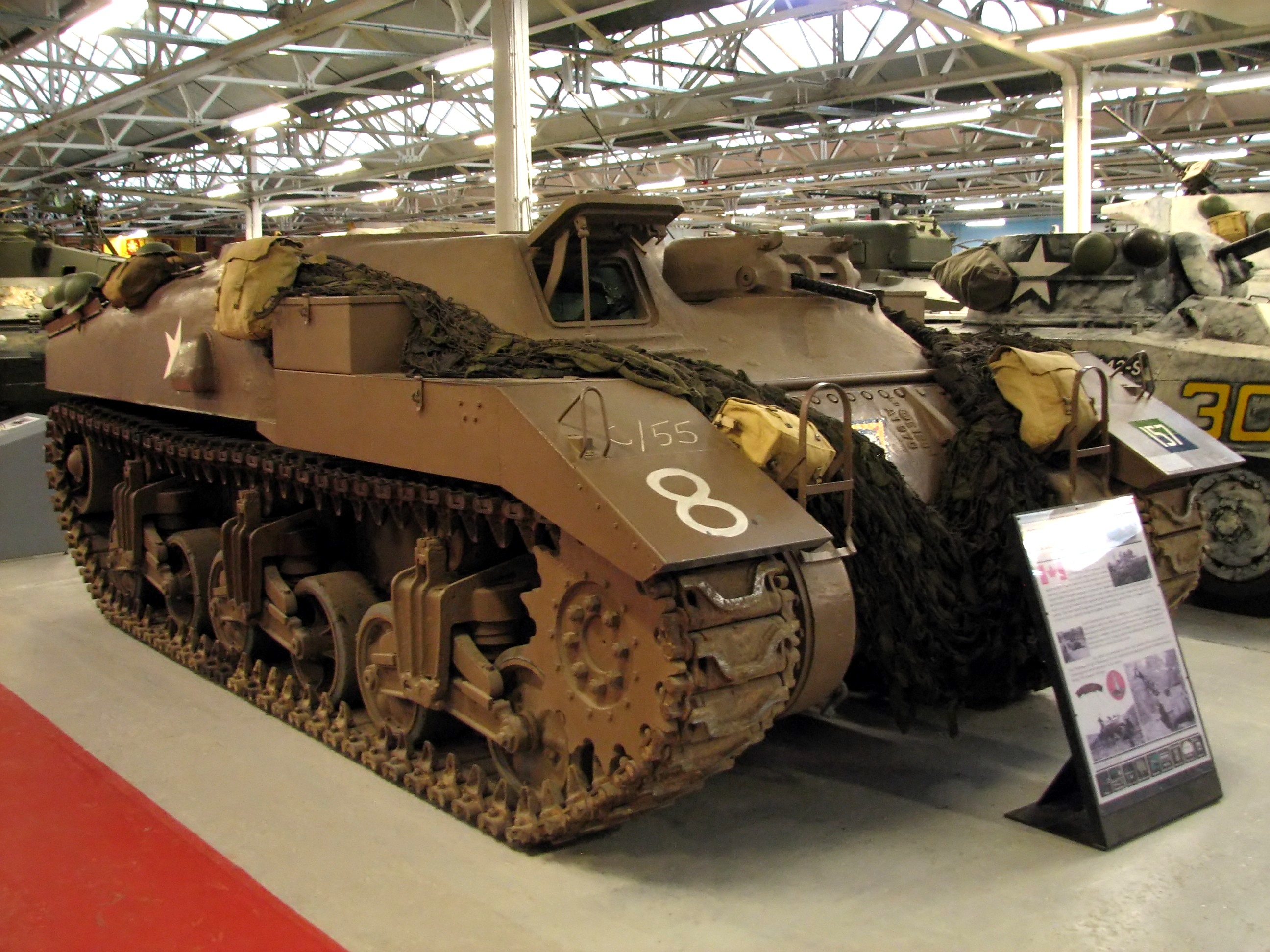
Ram Kangaroo at The Tank Museum, Bovington

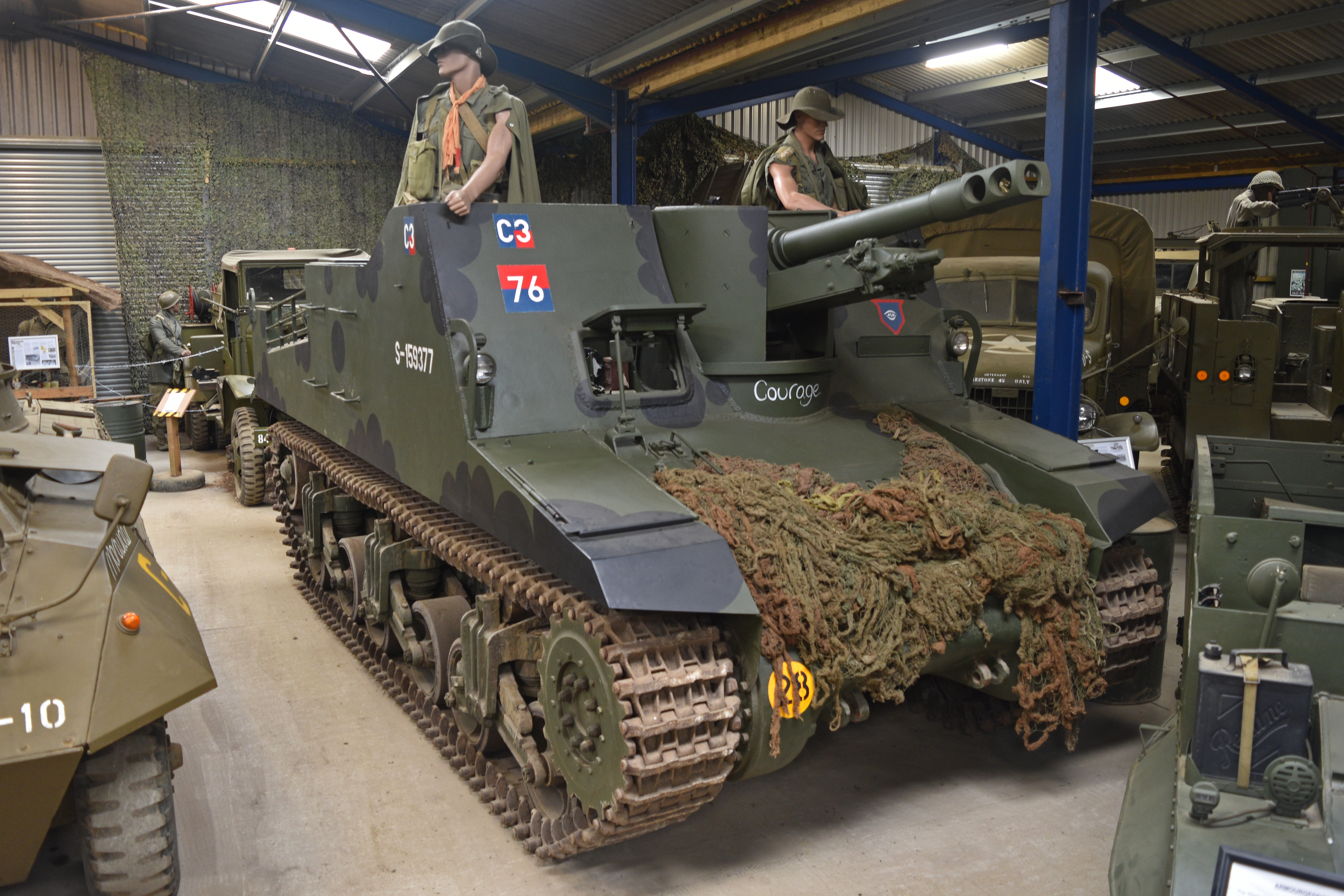
Sexton I

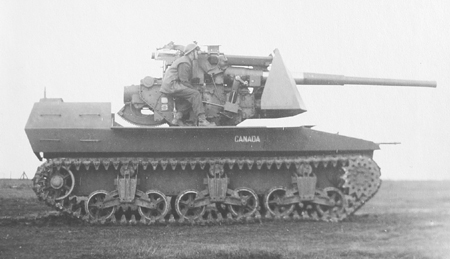
Ram 3.7 inch during testing

== See also ==
Tanks of comparable role, performance, and era

- Australian Sentinel
- British Cromwell
- German Panzer IV
- Hungarian Turán III
- Italian Carro Armato P 40
- Italian P43 (proposal)
- Japanese Type 3 Chi-Nu
- Soviet T-34
- Swedish Stridsvagn m/42
- American M4 Sherman
- Argentinian Nahuel DL 43

Other Commonwealth Tanks of the Second World War

- Bob Semple tank – New Zealand indigenous tank design
- Grizzly tank – Canadian licence built M4A1 Sherman
- Schofield tank – New Zealand indigenous tank design
- Sentinel tank - Australian indigenous tank design
