= Grizzly I cruiser =

Canadian medium tank

Grizzly I
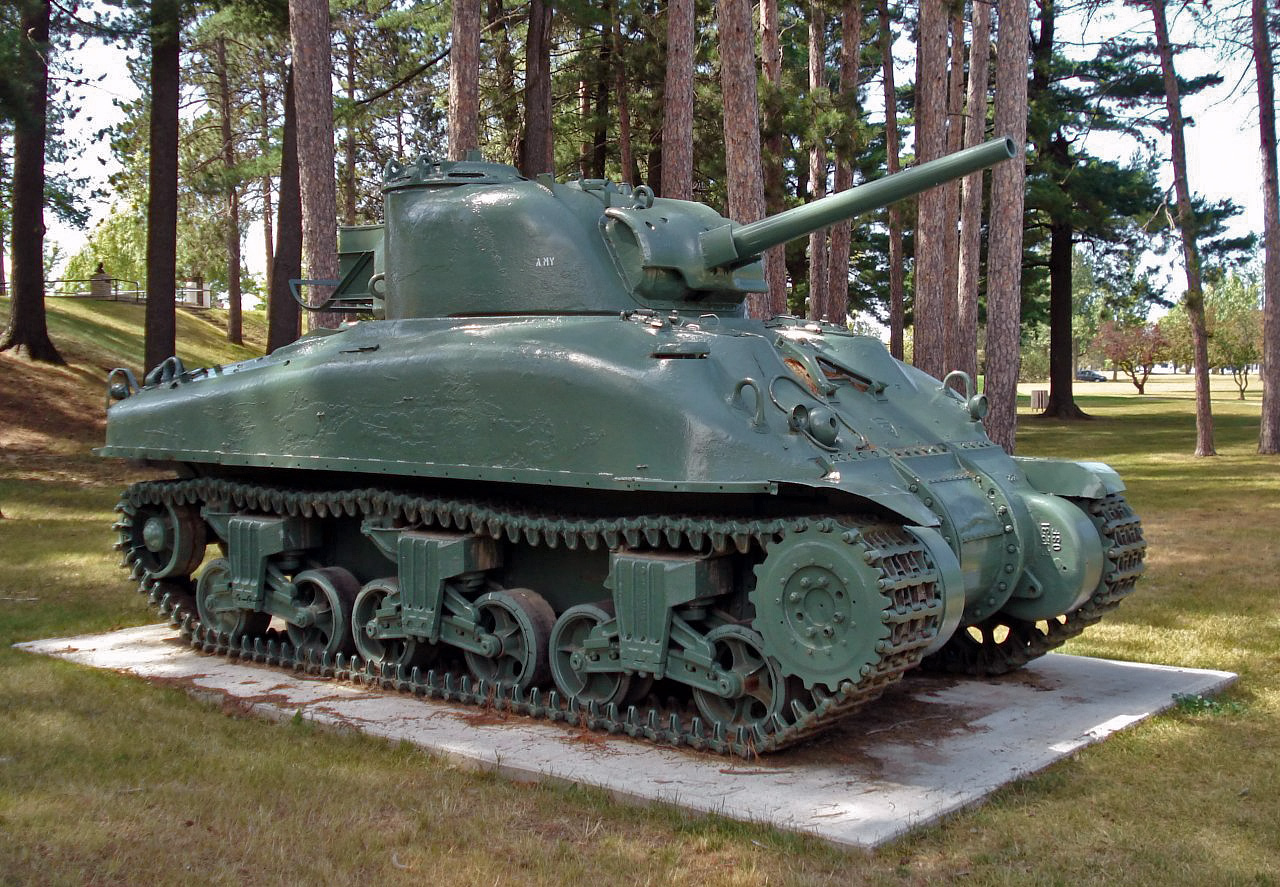
- Grizzly
- Type: Medium tank
- Place of origin: Canada

Service history
- In service: 1943–1945 (Canada); 1954–1980s (Portugal)
- Used by: Canada; Portugal
- Wars: World War II

Production history
- Designed: 1941
- Manufacturer: Montreal Locomotive Works
- Produced: 1943–1944
- No. built: 188

Specifications
- Mass: 29.91 t (30 tonnes)
- Length: 19 ft (5.816 m)
- Width: 2.626 m (8 ft 7.4 in)
- Height: 2.997 m (9 ft 10.0 in)
- Crew: 5 (Commander, gunner, loader, driver, co-driver/hull gunner)
- Armour: 75 mm
- Main armament: 75 mm M3 L/40 gun
- Secondary armament: 2 × .30-06 M1919 Browning machine gun
- Engine: Continental R-975 9-cylinder radial gas 400/340 hp (298/254 kW)
- Suspension: Vertical volute spring
- Operational range: 193 km (120 mi)
- Maximum speed: 24 mph (39 km/h)

The Tank, Cruiser, Grizzly, or Grizzly I, was a Canadian-built version of the M4A1 Sherman tank with modifications to stowage and pioneer tool location and accommodation for a Number 19 radio set. They used the same General Steel hull castings as late Pressed Steel-built M4A1(75)s, to include both the standard hull and the later ones with the armour thickened over the ammo bins. Grizzlies were originally built with US style tracks and sprockets. It was only later that they were refitted with Canadian Dry Pin (CDP) tracks, which did not require rubber.

The tank's production was stopped as it became apparent US production would be sufficient for the Allies' needs and the factory was turned over to other production. After the war, a number of Grizzly tanks were sold to Portugal as part of the NATO military assistance program; they were retired in the 1980s.

== History ==
M4A1 Grizzly at the Museum of Military History, Vienna

After the fall of France, it was decided the nascent Canadian armoured divisions would be equipped by tanks produced in Canada. The result was the Ram cruiser tank, based on the chassis and running gear of the US M3 Lee medium tank; Rams were produced by the Montreal Locomotive Works (MLW) from 1941 to 1943. The M3 was succeeded by the superior M4 Sherman. The Allies agreed to standardise on the M4, and MLW began producing the Grizzly in August 1943.

Grizzly production halted when it became apparent US production would be sufficient. Instead, MLW produced the Sexton self-propelled gun Mk II. The Sexton Mk II used the Grizzly chassis, with the upper hull modified to carry the Commonwealth standard QF 25 pounder gun. The Sexton was the Commonwealth counterpart to the US 105 mm self-propelled howitzer M7 Priest. Some Grizzly medium tanks were fitted with an Ordnance QF 17-pounder (as per the Sherman Firefly) and used for training in Canada.

After the war, 55 Grizzly tanks, 40 Grizzly based armoured personnel carriers and a number of Sexton II self-propelled guns were sold to Portugal as part of the NATO military assistance program. They were retired in the 1980s.

== Design ==
The Grizzly left the factory with the standard US 13 tooth sprocket.

The CDP tracks and 17 tooth sprocket, generally associated with the Grizzly were not introduced until after Grizzly production ceased. Those, along with the heavier duty bogie units were developed for the Sexton 25 pounder SP gun. At some later point, Grizzlies were retrofitted with the new sprocket and tracks. The CDP track was lighter and simpler than the standard US tracks and did not require rubber, which was scarce since the Japanese advance into Southeast Asia and the conquest of Malaya.

Some were converted into the Skink anti-aircraft tank with a turret mounting four 20 mm Polsten guns.

Grizzly tank with the related Sexton behind

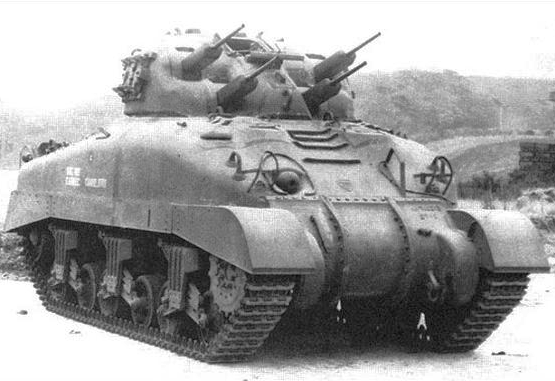
Skink self-propelled anti-air gun, Tank AA, 20 mm Quad, Skink

== See also ==
- Bob Semple tank – New Zealand indigenous tank design
- Ram tank – Canadian indigenous tank design
- Schofield tank – New Zealand indigenous tank design
- Sentinel tank – Australian indigenous tank design
