= Fokker C.XIV =

C.XIV-W
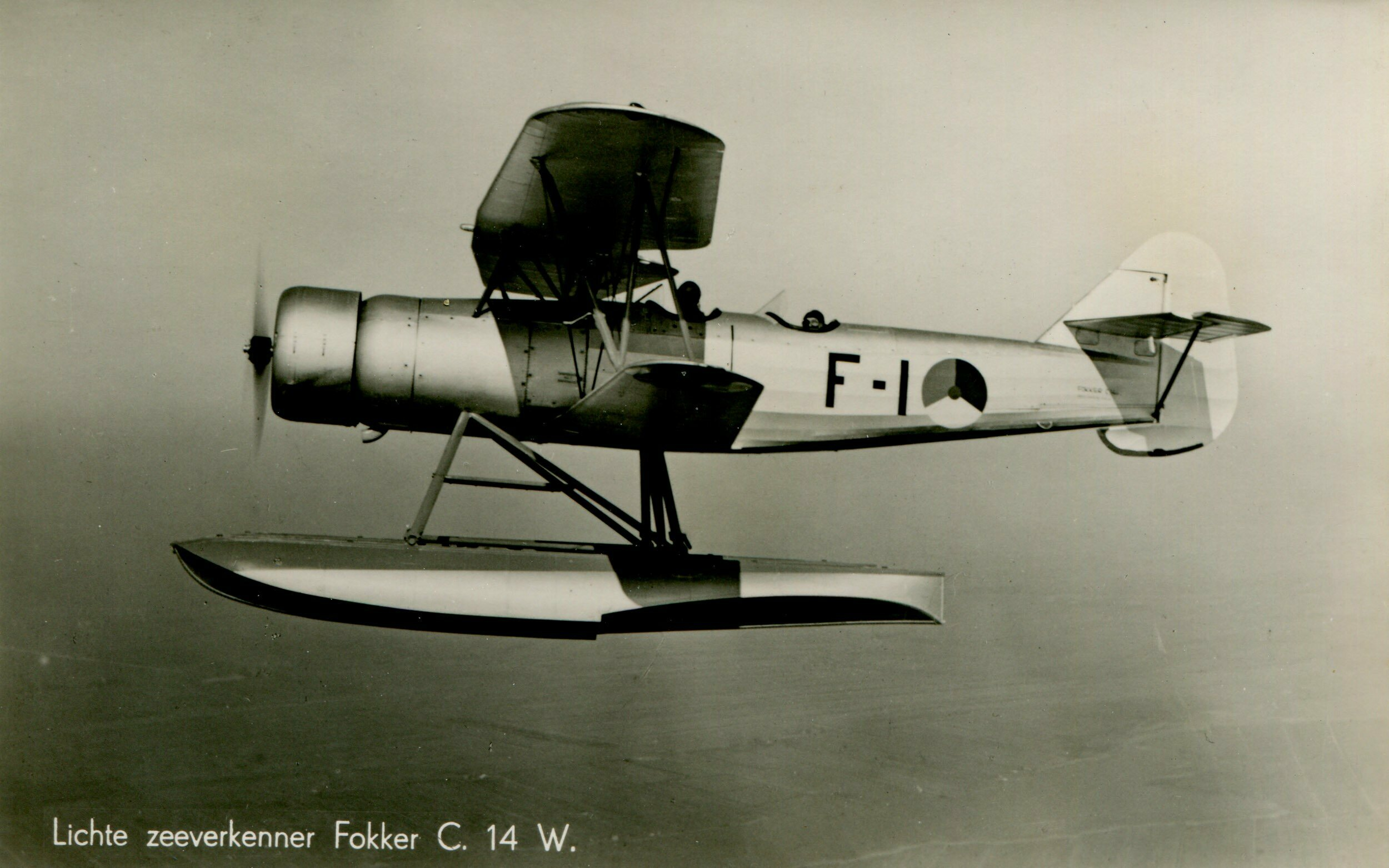

General information
- Type: Reconnaissance seaplane
- Manufacturer: Fokker
- Primary user: Royal Netherlands Navy
- Number built: 24

History
- First flight: 1937

The Fokker CXIV-W was a reconnaissance seaplane produced in the Netherlands in the 1930s. It was a conventional, single-bay biplane with staggered wings of unequal span braced by N-struts. The pilot and observer sat in tandem, open cockpits, and the undercarriage consisted of twin pontoons. 11 of the 24 examples produced were stationed in the Dutch East Indies. These were later joined by 12 aircraft that had escaped to the UK following the German invasion of the Netherlands in 1940. All C.XIVs were destroyed during the Japanese invasion of the Dutch East Indies.

== Operators ==
Netherlands

- Royal Netherlands Navy

== Specifications ==
Data from War Planes of the Second World War

General characteristics

- Crew: Two
- Length: 9.50 m (31 ft 2 in)
- Wingspan: 12.01 m (39 ft 5 in)
- Height: 4.24 m (13 ft 11 in)
- Wing area: 32 m^{2} (340 sq ft)
- Empty weight: 1,329 kg (2,930 lb)
- Gross weight: 1,950 kg (4,300 lb)
- Powerplant: 1 × Wright R-975-E3 , 340 kW (450 hp)

Performance

- Maximum speed: 230 km/h (143 mph, 124 kn) at 430 m (1,400 ft)
- Cruise speed: 180 km/h (110 mph, 96 kn) (55% power)
- Range: 950 km (590 mi, 510 nmi) at 180 km/h (110 mph)
- Service ceiling: 4,800 m (15,750 ft)
- Time to altitude: 8.5 min to 9,840 ft (3,000 m)

Armament

- 1 × fixed, forward-firing 7.9 mm FN-Browning machine gun in forward fuselage
- 1 × trainable, rearward-firing 7.9 mm FN-Browning machine gun in observer's cockpit

== See also ==
Related lists

- List of aircraft of World War II
