= Schofield tank =

New Zealand light tank prototype

Light Tank, Wheel-and-Track (Schofield)
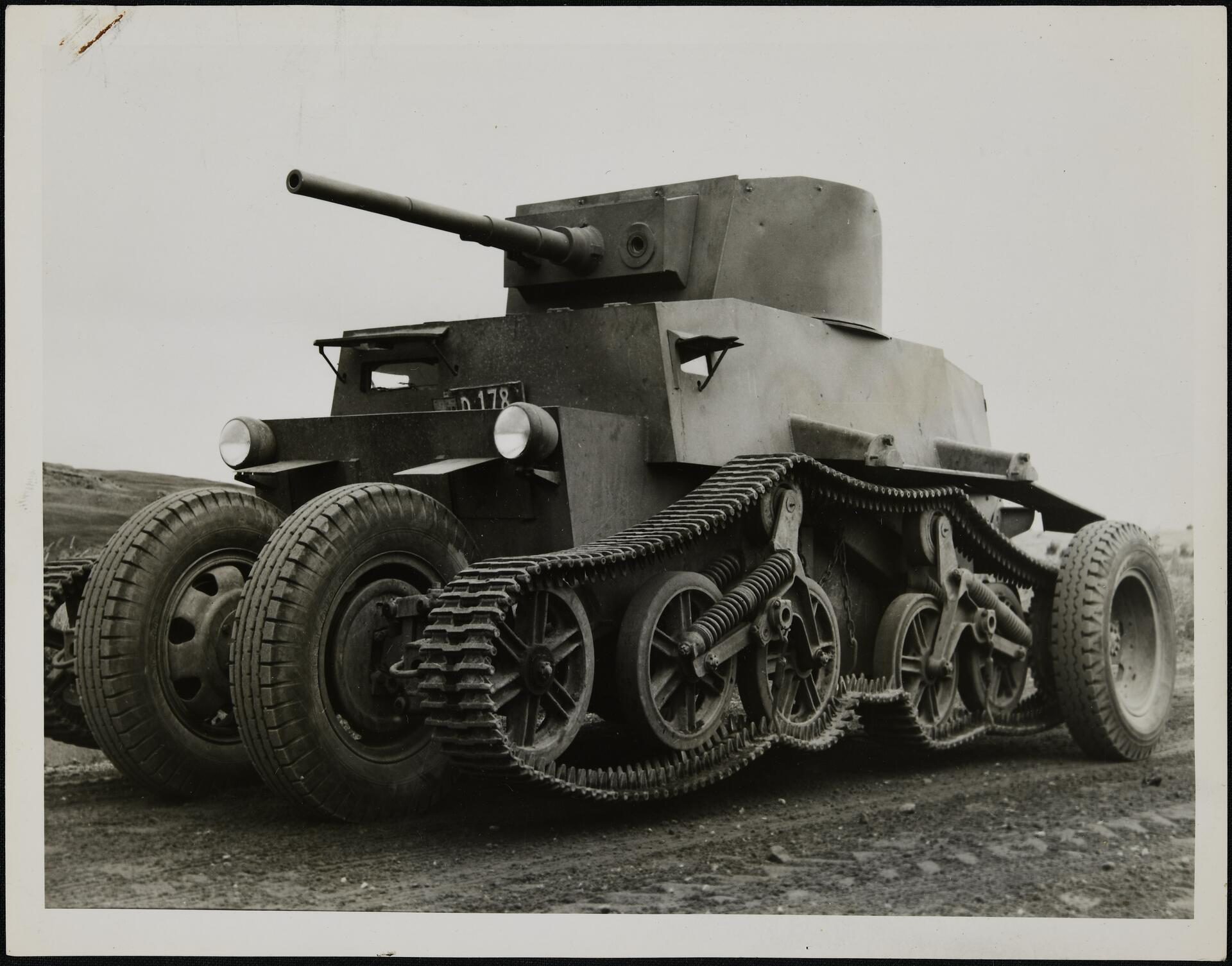
- Type: Light tank
- Place of origin: New Zealand

Specifications
- Mass: 5.21 long tons (5,290 kg)
- Length: 3.99 m (13 ft 1 in)
- Width: 2.6 m (8 ft 6 in)
- Height: 2.02 m (6 ft 8 in) on tracks; 2.1 m (6 ft 11 in) on wheels
- Crew: 3 (commander, gunner, driver)
- Armor: 6–10 mm
- Main armament: Ordnance QF 2 pounder
- Secondary armament: 7.92 mm Besa machine gun
- Engine: Chevrolet petrol 6-cylinder 29.5 hp (22.0 kW)
- Suspension: Horstmann suspension
- Operational range: 560 mi (900 km)
- Maximum speed: 45 mph (72 km/h) on wheels; 27 mph (43 km/h) on tracks

The Schofield tank, named after its designer, was a New Zealand tank design of the Second World War. Developed in 1940 when it seemed that the Pacific War might reach New Zealand and with little likelihood of weapons coming from Britain, it did not enter service. It was designed to run on either tracks or wheels.

== Design and development ==
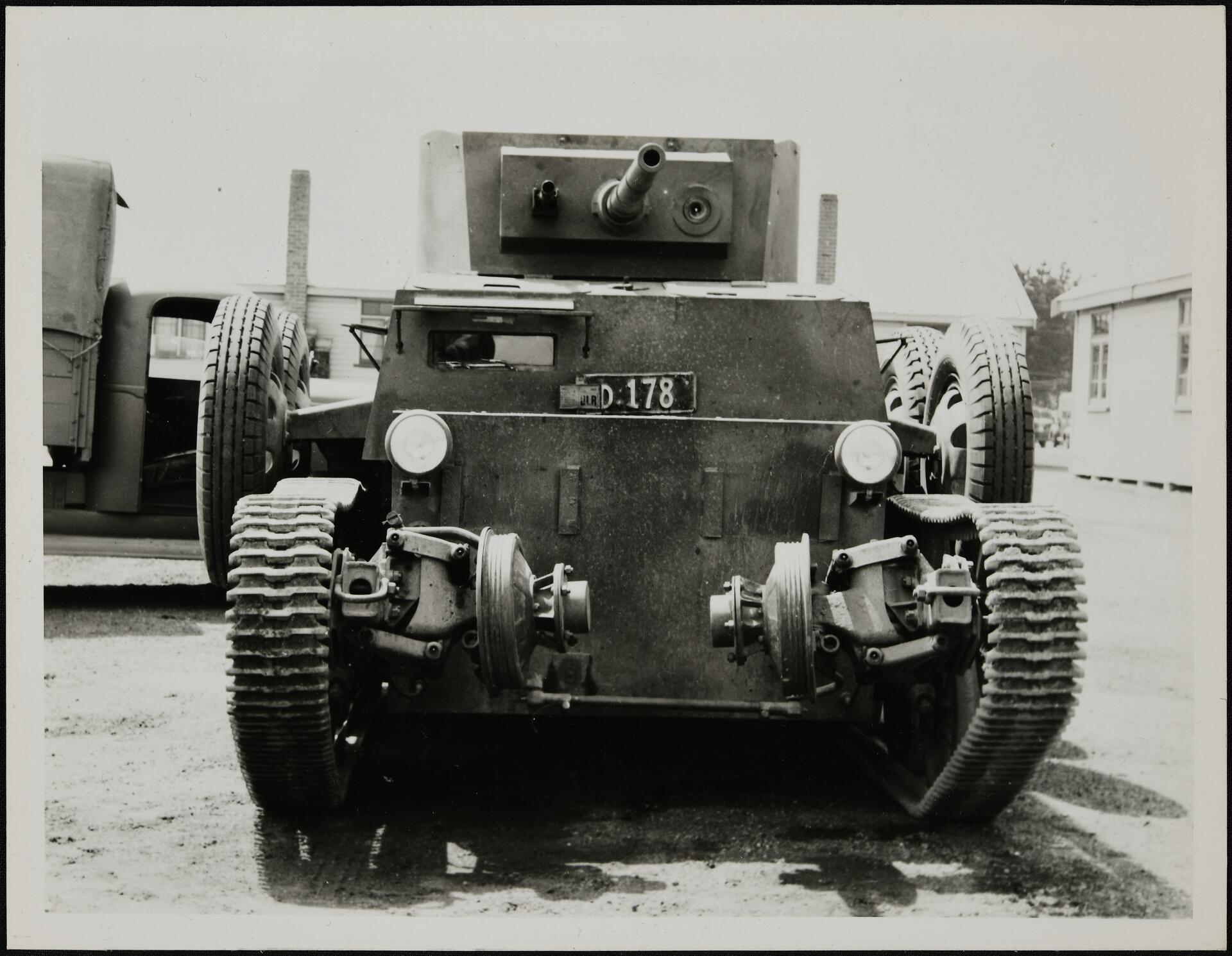
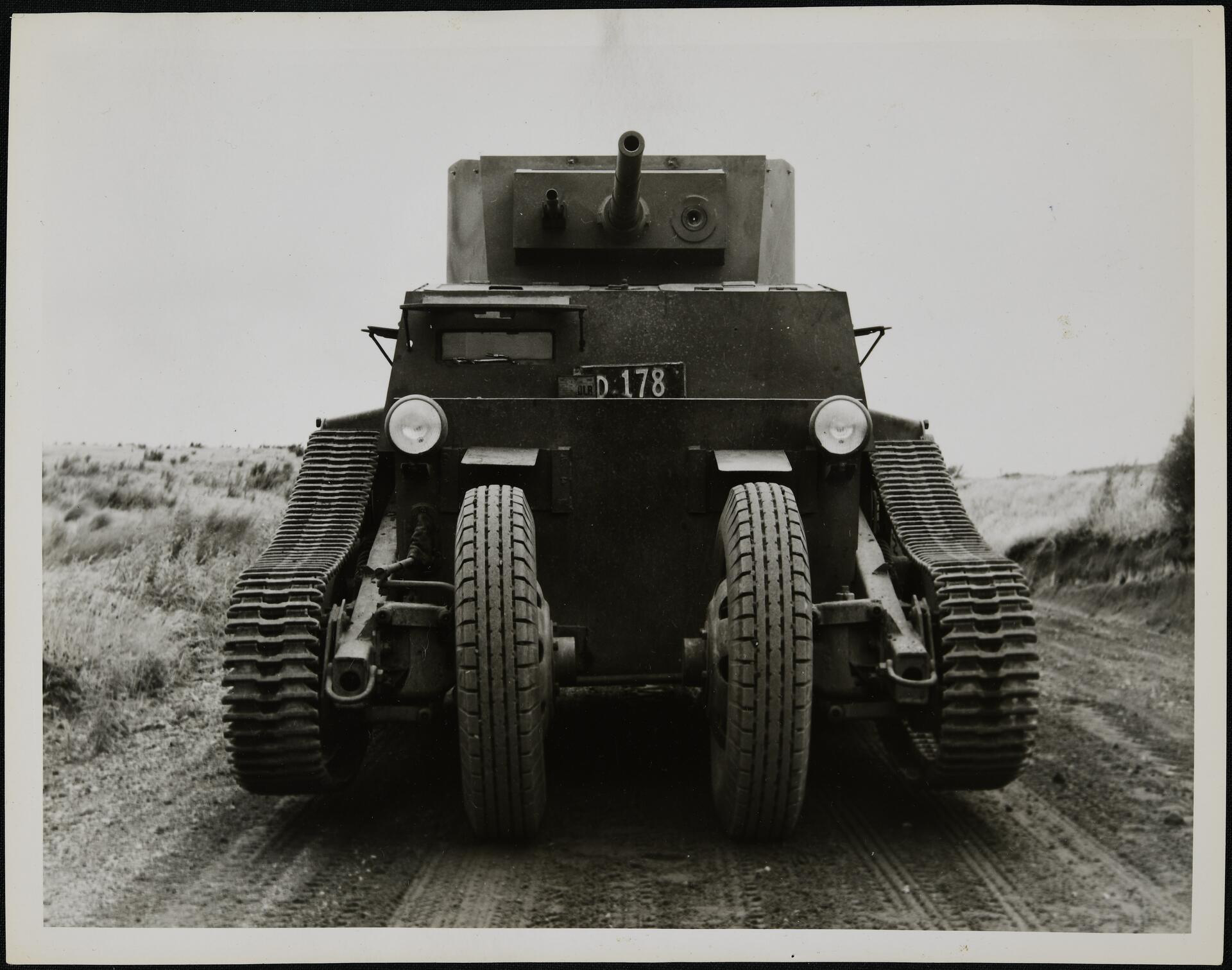
Schofield tank in its tracked (left) and wheeled (right) configuration

In around June 1940 Ernest James Schofield, a motor vehicle dealer for General Motors in Wellington, approached his MP Bill Anderton with an idea for a fighting vehicle that could run on tracks or wheels. He had at this stage constructed a basic model from Meccano showing the basic principle of operation.

Schofield's tank was based on the chassis of a Chevrolet 6 long hundredweight (300 kg) truck using the suspension from a Universal Carrier. Wheels normally carried on the hull could be bolted on so that it could use these rather than the tracks. As initially designed it had a crew of three: machine gunner and driver at the front and a second machine gun in a turret at the rear.

The initial design performed badly in trials but the Government sought an improved version. Designed by another member of the original team, the improved model used a better transmission and the turret now contained a QF 2 pounder gun with a co-axial Besa machine gun. By the time it was complete, in 1942, New Zealand had received tanks from the UK and US.

The armour plating was provided by the New Zealand Railways. The four wheels shared drive and idler sprockets with the track, and the move from wheels to track, and vice versa, could be made from within the hull.

In 1943 the improved design prototype was shipped to Britain, where it was evaluated by the Department of Tank Design. Although not completely critical, experts recommended the project halt. The tank was stored for a while and scrapped after the war.

== See also ==
- Half-track

=== Similar tanks ===
- American Disston Tractor Tank
- Soviet KhTZ-16
- Soviet NI tank
- New Zealand Bob Semple tank

=== Other Commonwealth Tanks of the Second World War ===
- Bob Semple tank – New Zealand improvised tank design
- Sentinel tank – Australian indigenous tank design
- Ram tank – Canadian indigenous tank design
- Grizzly tank – Canadian licence built M4A1 Sherman
