= STZ-5 =

Soviet military tractor

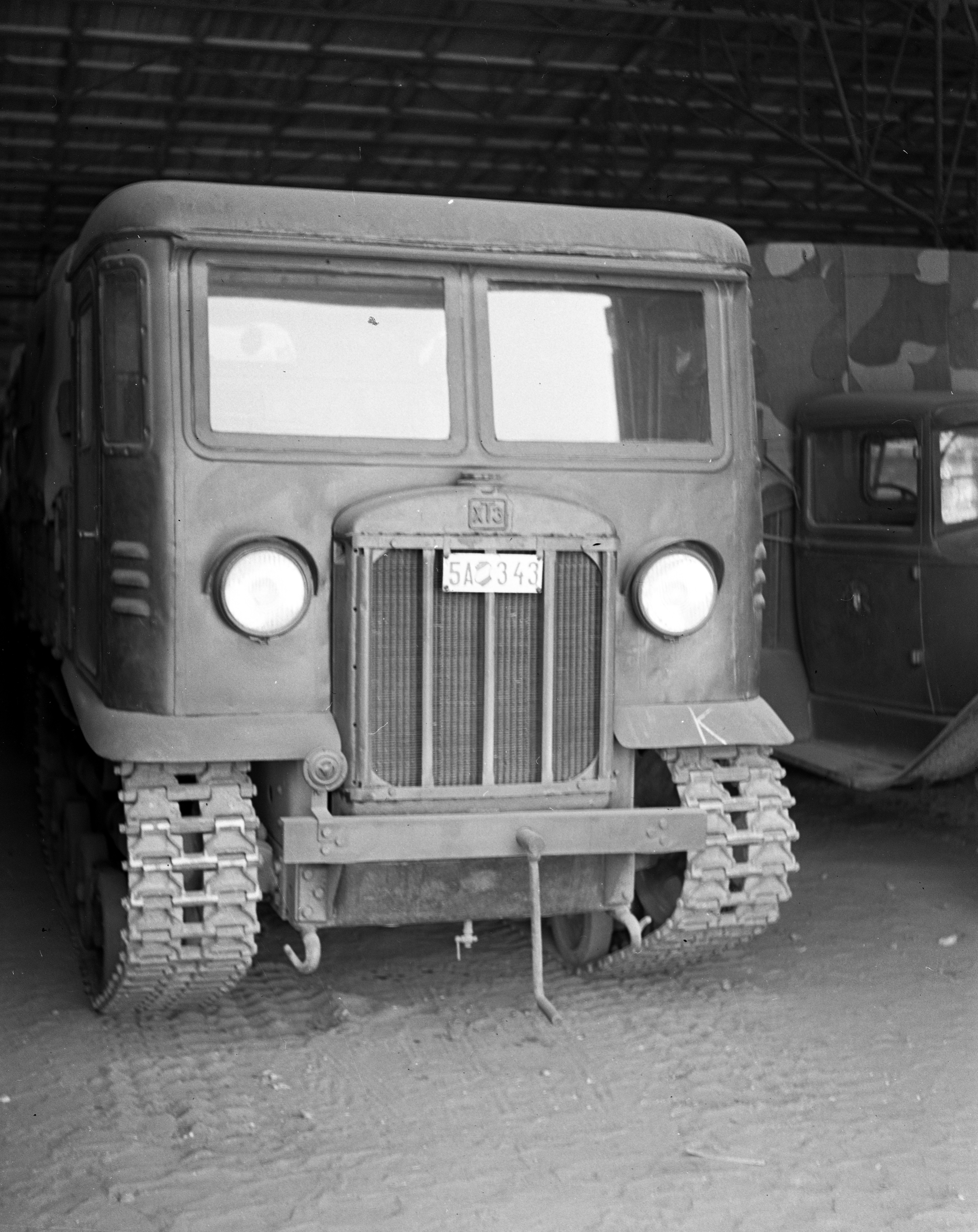
- STZ-5 captured by Hungarian army, 1943
- Type: Prime mover
- Place of origin: Soviet Union

Service history
- In service: 1937 – 1945

Production history
- Manufacturer: STZ (Stalingradsky Traktorny Zavod)
- Produced: 1937 – 1942
- No. built: 9944

Specifications
- Mass: 5,840 kg (5.75 long tons)
- Length: 4.15 m (13.62 ft)
- Width: 1.855 m (6.09 ft)
- Height: 2.36 m (7.74 ft)
- Engine: 1MA (7.46 L In-line 4 cylinder petrol); 39 kW (52 hp) at 1250 rpm.
- Payload capacity: Transport mass: 1.5t; Towable mass: 4.5 to 7.25t
- Ground clearance: Ground: 0.29 m (11 in); Wading: 0.8 m (31 in)
- Operational range: 145 km
- Maximum speed: 25 km/h

The STZ-5 artillery tractor was a product of the Stalingrad Tractor Factory (STZ) (Russian: Сталинградский тракторный завод) from 1937 to 1942 in the Soviet Union. The tractor was designed to tow division to corps level guns and howitzers of 8 tonnes and less. The STZ-5 was one of the few artillery tractors specifically designed by the Soviet government for its role. With over 9900 built, it was the most-produced Soviet ‘military’ tractor during the war.

== Description ==
The STZ-5 features a fully enclosed metal, two person crew compartment (cab over engine design) with a flat wood cargo bed with drop down wood side walls. The MA-1 multifuel engine (7.4 L. 4 in-line cylinders) was rated at 52HP (38.8 kW) at 1250 rpm. The STZ-5 was rated to carry 1.5 tonnes of cargo on its bed or tow 8 tonnes or less. Under optimum conditions its 6 gear transmission (5 forward, 1 reverse) could yield a maximum speed of 25 km/h (15 mph). It had an operational range of 140 km.

== Development ==
The STZ-5 was designed at the Stalingrad tractor factory with initial work on the project beginning in 1933. The designers borrowed elements and ideas from the British Vickers-Carden-Loyd light tank and the American International Harvester TA-40 agricultural tractor. Their design goal was to achieve a vehicle capable of acting as a military (towing) tractor and a civilian agricultural tractor. They developed two vehicles on the same chassis and engine, the STZ NATI 1TA (STZ-3) agricultural tractor and the STZ NATI 2TB (STZ-5) military transport. The vehicles were submitted for trial in 1935 and were approved however design refinements for mass production were continued until 1937 when mass production began.

== Operational history ==
The STZ-5 was designated to tow division level to corps level guns, howitzers and anti-aircraft guns.

This prime mover was praised for its reliability and good cross country ability. It was criticized for having low power, a narrow track and high ground pressure, which would have led to poor performance in snow and mud.

During the Siege of Odessa in 1941, the STZ-5 was used to make the improvised NI tank.

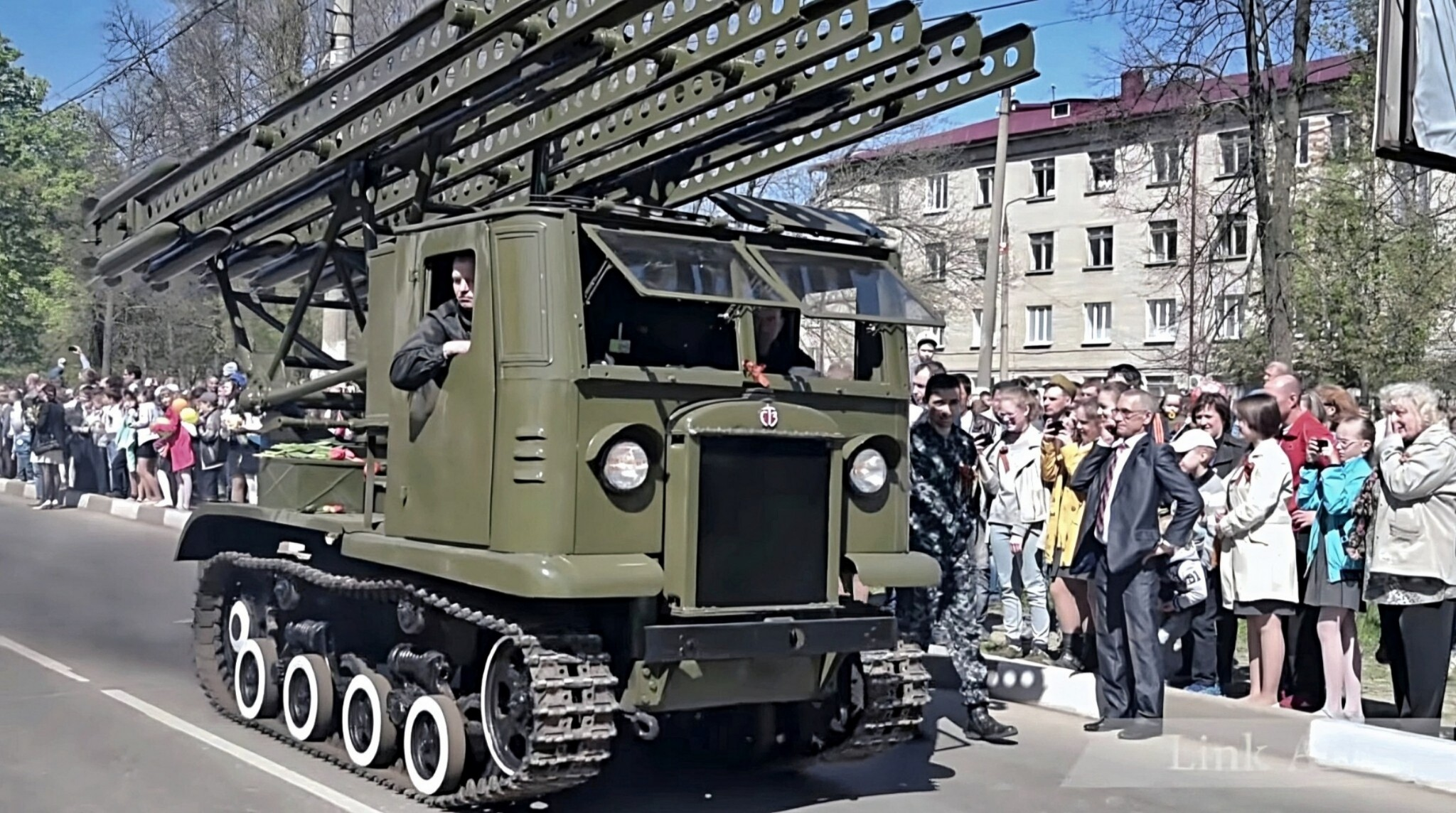
BM-13-16 rocket launcher on STZ-5 chassis.

A small number of these vehicles had the 132mm rocket launcher system attached (BM-13-16). While not a common Soviet weapon system these variants of the STZ-5 were used at the battles around Moscow in 1941 and Stalingrad in 1942.

The German army readily pressed captured STZ-5 tractors into service and designated them as the Artillerieschlepper STZ 601(r).
