= Wright R-975 Whirlwind =

Radial aircraft engines in the US

R-975 Whirlwind
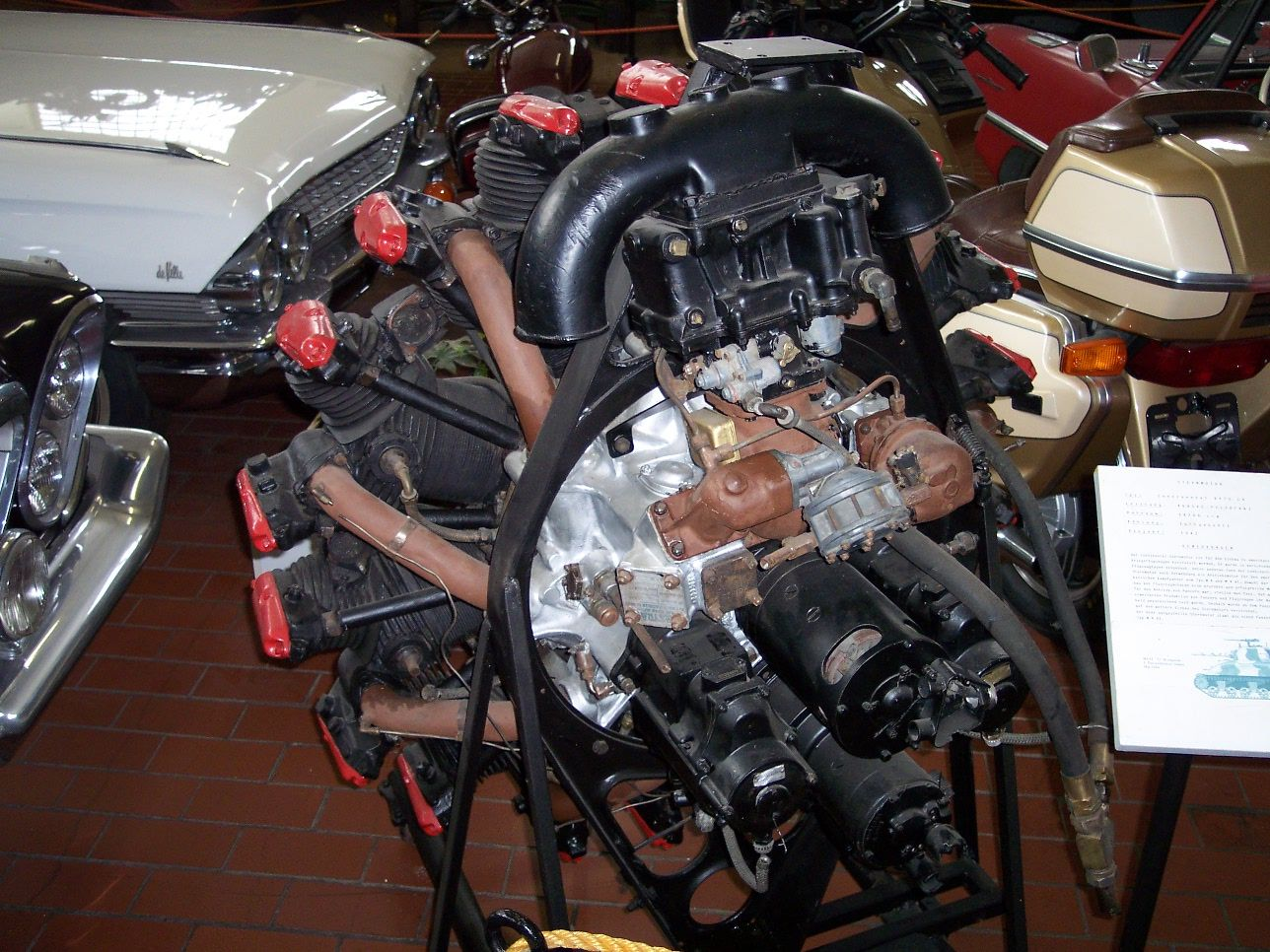
- A Continental-built R-975 from a Sherman tank
- Type: Air-cooled 9-cylinder radial piston engine
- National origin: United States
- Manufacturer: Wright Aeronautical
- Built by: Continental Motors
- Major applications: Beechcraft Staggerwing; North American BT-9; Vultee BT-15 Valiant; M4 Sherman tank; Piasecki HUP Retriever; M18 Hellcat
- Manufactured: January 1929–April 1945
- Number built: 62,244 total: 7,707 by Wright; 54,103 by Continental; 434 by Naval Aircraft Factory

The Wright R-975 Whirlwind was a series of nine-cylinder, air-cooled radial aircraft engines built by the Wright Aeronautical division of Curtiss-Wright. These engines had a displacement of about 975 cu in (15.98 L), and power ratings ranging from 300 hp (220 kW) to 550 hp (410 kW), depending on variant and rating basis. They were the largest members of the Wright Whirlwind engine family to be produced commercially, and they were also the most numerous.

During World War II, Continental Motors built the R-975 under license as a powerplant for Allied tanks and other armored vehicles. Tens of thousands of engines were built for this purpose, dwarfing the R-975's usage in aircraft, where it was overshadowed by the similar Pratt & Whitney R-985. After the war, Continental continued to produce its own versions of the R-975 into the 1950s; the Continental R-975-46A was rated at 550 hp (410 kW) at 2,400 rpm.

The R-975 powered the American World War II M18 Hellcat tank destroyer, which is claimed to have been the fastest tracked armored fighting vehicle ever built.

== Design and development ==
Wright introduced the J-6 Whirlwind family in 1928 to replace the nine-cylinder R-790 series. The J-6 family included varieties with five, seven, and nine cylinders. The nine-cylinder version was originally known as the J-6 Whirlwind Nine, or J-6-9 for short. The U.S. government designated it as the R-975; Wright later adopted this and dropped the J-6 nomenclature.

Like all the members of the J-6 Whirlwind family, the R-975 had larger cylinders than the R-790. The piston stroke of 5.5 in (14.0 cm) was unchanged, but the cylinder bore was expanded to 5.0 in (12.7 cm) from the R-790's bore of 4.5 in (11.4 cm). While the R-790 was naturally aspirated, the R-975, like the other J-6 engines, had a gear-driven supercharger to boost its power output.

Wright gradually developed the R-975, at first using suffix letters to indicate successive versions. The original R-975 (or J-6-9) was rated for 300 hp (224 kW), while the R-975E of 1931 could do 330 hp (246 kW) thanks to an improved cylinder head design. Wright later added numeric suffixes to show different power levels. The R-975E-1, introduced the same year as the R-975E, was rated at 365 hp (272 kW) thanks to higher-compression pistons and a slightly greater RPM limit. An even more powerful version, the R-975E-3, was also introduced that year, with greater supercharging and a still higher RPM limit, and was progressively refined until the final model of 1935 could reach 450 hp (336 kW) for takeoff.

== Operational history ==
As the most powerful Whirlwind to be produced, commercially, it was also the most successful. It powered a wide variety of civil utility aircraft, such as the Beechcraft Staggerwing, and various airliners, such as the Ford 4-AT-E Trimotor and the Lockheed 10B Electra. In addition, it powered U.S. military training aircraft including the North American BT-9 and Vultee BT-15 Valiant for the Army and the Curtiss-Wright SNC Falcon for the Navy. The Curtiss F9C Sparrowhawk parasite fighter operated from U.S. Navy airships was also powered by the R-975.

One notable record set by a Wright J-6 Whirlwind-powered aircraft occurred during July 28–30, 1931, when Russell Norton Boardman and John Louis Polando flew non-stop from Floyd Bennett Field, on Long Island to Istanbul, Turkey in the Cape Cod, a Bellanca Special J-300 high-wing monoplane in 49:20 hours, establishing a distance record of 5,011.8 miles (8,065.7 km), the first nonstop record flight to surpasse 5,000 mi (8,000 km).

However, the R-975 faced heavy competition from Pratt & Whitney's R-985 Wasp Junior and from their larger R-1340 Wasp. Pratt & Whitney R-985 outsold the Wright R-975 by a wide margin.

Wright's production of the R-975 ceased in 1945, with over 7,000 engines being produced by the company.

=== Production by Continental Motors ===
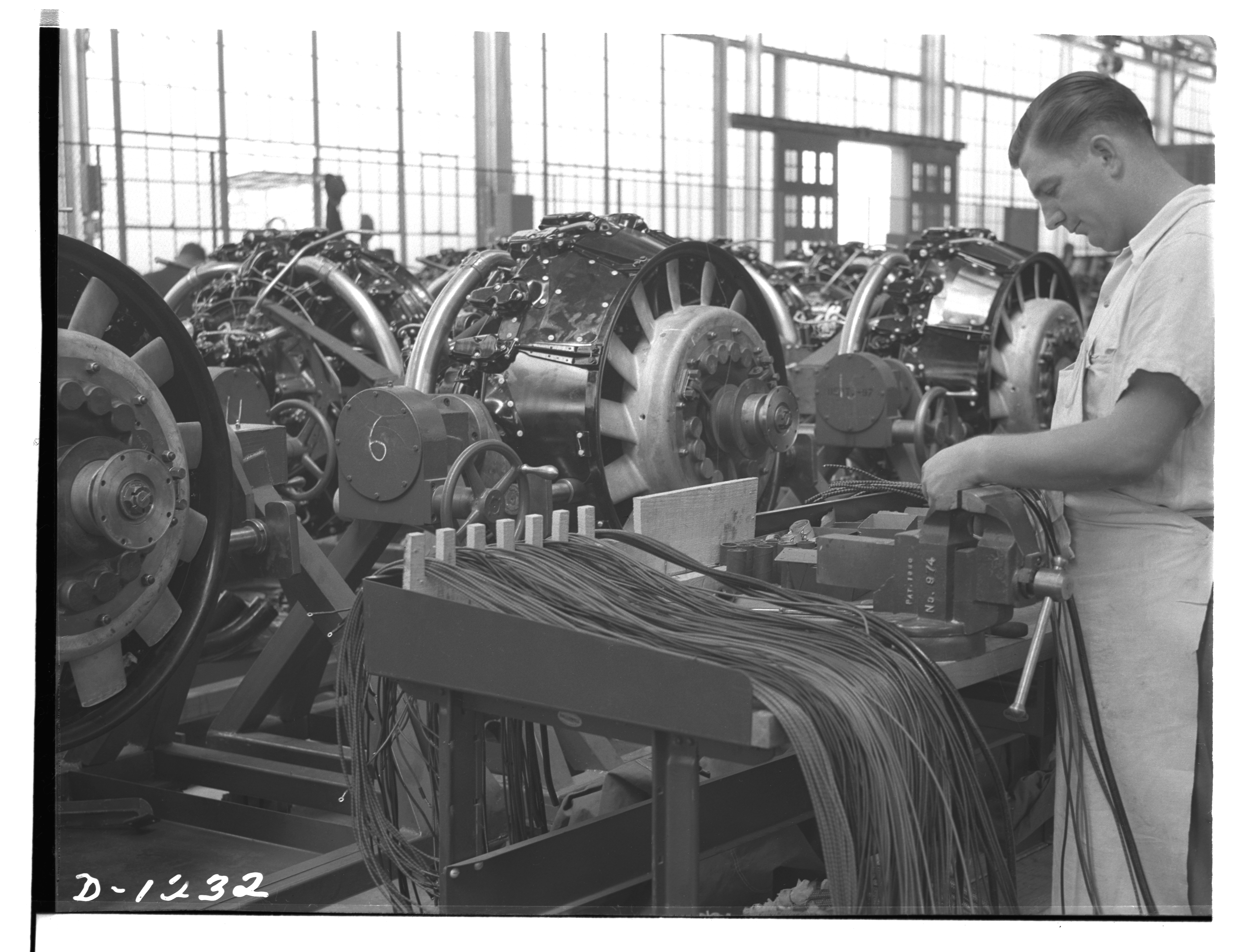
Tank manufacture (Chrysler). M-3s, the twenty-eight ton "medium" tanks being turned out in Detroit at the Chrysler tank arsenal, are powered by nine-cylinder, 400-horsepower Wright Whirlwind aviation-type engines. These men are working on the engine wiring sub-assembly.

In 1939 the U.S. Army, which had been using Continental R-670 radial engines in its light tanks, chose Continental Motors to build the R-975 under license as the engine for its M2 medium tanks. Subsequently, the same engine was selected for the M3 Lee medium tank, the M4 Sherman medium tank, the Canadian Ram tank (which used the M3 chassis), the M7 Priest self-propelled gun, the M18 Hellcat tank destroyer, and other Allied armored vehicles based on these. Continental versions of the R-975 for armored vehicles included the R-975E-C2, the R-975-C1, and the R-975-C4. In contrast to the 7,000 built by Wright, Continental built over 53,000 R-975 engines.

When installed in a tank, the R-975 did not have the benefit of being cooled by air slipstream or propeller blast, so a cooling fan was attached to the power shaft and surrounded by a shroud to provide the same effect.

After the war, Continental introduced its own R-975 version for aircraft, the R9-A. Though it was basically similar to other R-975 engines, and its compression ratio and supercharger gear ratio were unchanged from the R-975E-3, other improvements in the R9-A allowed it to achieve 525 hp (391 kW) for takeoff, surpassing any Wright version. A military version, the R-975-46, could reach 550 hp (410 kW), and was used in Piasecki's HUP Retriever and H-25 Army Mule helicopters. Continental's production of R-975 engines continued into the 1950s.

=== Other license-built R-975s ===
The engine was built in Spain as the Hispano-Suiza 9Q or Hispano-Wright 9Q without modification apart from the use of Hispano's patented nitriding finishing process and, on one version only, the 9Qdr, an epicyclic output speed reducer. The R-975 was also produced under licence by Fábrica Nacional de Motores in Brazil.

== Variants ==
J-6-9 (R-975)
300 hp (220 kW) at 2,000 RPM.
R-975-20
300 hp (220 kW) for airship use
R-975E
330 hp (250 kW) at 2,000 RPM. Higher power from an improved cylinder head.
R-975E-1
365 hp (272 kW) at 2,100 RPM. Higher compression ratio.
R-975E-3
420 hp (310 kW) at 2,200 RPM up to 1,400 ft (430 m), 450 hp (340 kW) at 2,250 RPM for takeoff. Increased supercharging, slightly higher compression ratio.
R-975E-C2
400 hp (300 kW) at 2,400 RPM. Built by Continental Motors under license for use in armored vehicles.
Continental R9-A
500 hp (370 kW) at 2,300 RPM at 4,000 ft (1,200 m), 525 hp (391 kW) at 2,300 RPM for takeoff. Continental's improved post-war version.
Continental R-975-46A
550 hp (410 kW) (410 kW (550 hp)) at 2,400 RPM. Post-war Continental variant.
Hispano-Suiza 9Q
Licence-built R-975 J-6 Whirlwind
Hispano-Suiza 9Qa
variant of the licence-built R-975 J-6 Whirlwind
Hispano-Suiza 9Qb
variant of the licence-built R-975 J-6 Whirlwind
Hispano-Suiza 9Qc
variant of the licence-built R-975 J-6 Whirlwind
Hispano-Suiza 9Qd
variant of the licence-built R-975 J-6 Whirlwind
Hispano-Suiza 9Qdr
variant of the licence-built R-975 J-6 Whirlwind

== Applications ==
=== Wright J-6-9 and R-975 ===
- ASJA L2
- Avro Anson Mk IV
- Beechcraft Staggerwing B17R, C17R, and D17R
- Bellanca CH-300 Pacemaker
- Berliner-Joyce OJ-2
- Caribbean Traders Husky III
- Cessna DC-6A Chief
- Curtiss Kingbird
- Curtiss-Wright CW-14 Travel Air/Speedwing/Sportsman Deluxe/Osprey
- Curtiss-Wright CW-22
- Curtiss-Wright SNC-1 Falcon
- de Havilland DH.75B Hawk Moth
- Dewoitine D.31
- Dewoitine D.35
- Douglas RD-1 & C-21/OA-3 Dolphin
- Emsco B-5 Challenger
- Goodyear K-1
- Curtiss F9C Sparrowhawk
- Fokker Universal
- Fokker C-5
- Fokker C-7
- Fokker C.XIV
- Fokker T.VIII
- Ford 4-AT-E Trimotor
- Interstate XTD3R
- Ireland N-2B Neptune
- Keystone XOK
- Keystone-Loening K-84 Commuter
- Koolhoven F.K.56
- Lockheed Model 12B Electra Junior
- McDonnell XV-1
- Messerschmitt M 18
- Noorduyn Norseman Mk.1
- North American BT-9
- North American NA-57
- North American NA-64 Yale
- Pitcairn PA-19
- Pitcairn-Cierva PCA-2/OP-1
- Pitcairn PA-33 & 34/OP-2
- Ryan B-5 Brougham
- Spartan C4-300
- Stearman Model 6C Cloudboy
- Stinson SM-1F Detroiter
- Timm T-840
- Townsend Thunderbird (as rebuilt)
- Travel Air B9-4000
- Travel Air 6000B
- Travel Air Type R Mystery Ship
- VL Pyry
- Vultee BT-15 Valiant
- Waco JTO
- Waco JYO
- Waco JWM and JYM mailplanes
- M4 Sherman

=== Continental R-975 ===
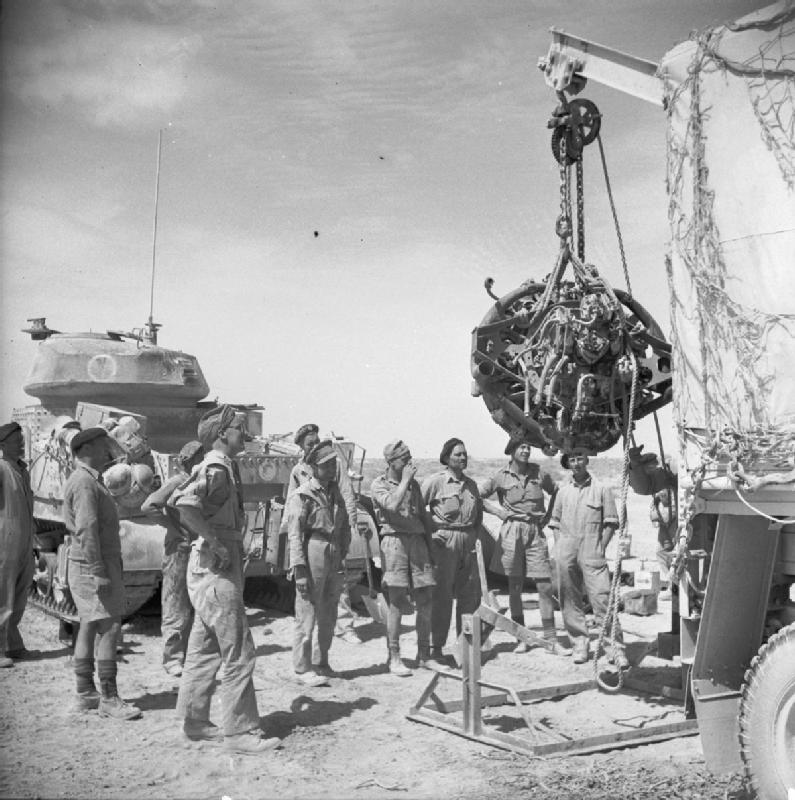
A Grant tank R-975 engine being removed by Royal Army Ordnance Corps mechanics

- Beech D-18C
- Grizzly I cruiser – Canadian production of M4A1 Sherman tank
- Kangaroo armoured personnel carrier modification of M7 Priest and other vehicles
- Kellett XR-10
- M3 Lee
- M4 Sherman
- M7 Priest
- M18 Hellcat
- M12 gun motor carriage
- M40 gun motor carriage
- McDonnell XV-1
- Piasecki HUP Retriever
- Ram tank
- Sexton self-propelled gun
- Sikorsky XHJS-1 (S-53) – prototype helicopter
- Skink anti-aircraft tank – anti-aircraft vehicle based on Grizzly I

== Engines on display ==
Some museums which have R-975 engines on display:

- Pima Air & Space Museum in Tucson, Arizona has a Wright R-975.
- Hiller Aviation Museum in San Carlos, California has a Wright R-975.
- National Museum of Naval Aviation near Pensacola, Florida has a Continental R-975.
- Southern Museum of Flight in Birmingham, Alabama has a Continental R-975.
- Queensland Air Museum in Caloundra, Queensland, Australia has a Continental R-975.

== Specifications (Whirlwind R-975E-3) ==
Data from FAA type certificate data sheet for the R-975E-3; dimensions from Curtiss-Wright (1983).

=== General characteristics ===
- Type: 9-cylinder supercharged air-cooled radial piston engine
- Bore: 5.0 in (127 mm)
- Stroke: 5.5 in (140 mm)
- Displacement: 972 cu in (15.93 L)
- Length: 43.0 in (109.2 cm)
- Diameter: 45.0 in (114.3 cm)
- Dry weight: 675 lb (306 kg)

=== Components ===
- Valvetrain: 2 valves per cylinder, pushrod-actuated
- Supercharger: gear-driven, 10.15:1 impeller gear ratio
- Fuel type: 80 octane
- Reduction gear: Direct drive

=== Performance ===
- Power output: 420 hp (313 kW) at 2,200 RPM up to 1,400 ft (427 m); 450 hp (336 kW) at 2,250 RPM for takeoff
- Specific power: 0.43 hp/cu-in (19.7 kW/L)
- Compression ratio: 6.3:1
- Power-to-weight ratio: 0.62 hp/lb (1.02 kW/kg)

Specifications for different R-975 variants
Engine	Power, continuous	Power, takeoff	Compression ratio	Supercharger gear ratio	Octane rating	Dry weight
R-975E	330 hp (246 kW) at 2,000 RPM		5.1:1	7.8:1	73	635 lb (288 kg)
R-975E-1	365 hp (272 kW) at 2,100 RPM		6.1:1	7.8:1	73	660 lb (299 kg)
R-975E-3	420 hp (313 kW) at 2,200 RPM	450 hp (336 kW) at 2,250 RPM	6.3:1	10.15:1	80	675 lb (306 kg)
Continental R9-A	500 hp (373 kW) at 2,300 RPM	525 hp (391 kW) at 2,300 RPM	6.3:1	10.15:1	91	705 lb (320 kg)
Continental R-975-46A	—	550 hp (410 kW) at 2,400 RPM	—	—	—	730 lb (331.1 kg)

== See also ==
- Wright Whirlwind series

Related development

- Wright J-5/R-790
- Wright J-6-5/R-540
- Wright J-6-7/R-760

Comparable engines

- Alvis Leonides
- Pratt & Whitney R-985 Wasp Junior
- Bristol Mercury

Related lists

- List of aircraft engines
