= Skink anti-aircraft tank =

Canadian self-propelled anti-aircraft gun

Tank AA, 20mm Quad, Skink
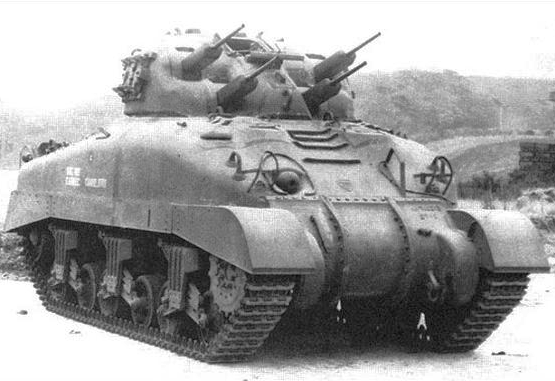
- Tank AA, 20 mm Quad, Skink
- Type: Self propelled anti-aircraft gun
- Place of origin: Canada

Production history
- No. built: 3

Specifications
- Mass: 28.5 t (25.9 tonnes) combat load
- Length: 19 ft 1 in (5.82 m)
- Width: 8 ft 7 in (2.62 m)
- Height: 9 ft 10 in (3 m)
- Crew: 4
- Armour: 2 inches (50 mm) glacis
- Main armament: 4 × 20 mm Polsten automatic cannon
- Engine: Continental R-975C1 radial engine, gasoline 350 hp (253 kW) at 2,400 rpm
- Power/weight: 14 hp/tonne
- Suspension: Vertical Volute spring Suspension (VVSS) (Note: Track width: 15 inch (39 cm) Canadian Dry Pin or 16.5 inch (42 cm) American pattern, rack tread: 83 inches (210 cm))
- Ground clearance: 17 inches (43 cm)
- Fuel capacity: 145 Imperial gallons (660 litres, 175 US gal)
- Operational range: 120 miles (193 km)
- Maximum speed: 24 mph (38.5 km/h) brief level

Tank AA, 20 mm Quad, Skink was a Canadian self-propelled anti-aircraft gun, developed in 1943–44, in response to a requirement from the First Canadian Army. Due to a lack of threat from the German Luftwaffe, the Skink was cancelled in 1944 after only three were built from Grizzly I cruisers.

== Development ==
The development of a fully enclosed quadruple 20 mm mounting on the chassis of the Grizzly tank (M4A1 Sherman tanks built in Canada from August 1943) was approved by the Canadian Army Technical Development Board as Project 47 in March, 1943. In keeping with the tradition of giving Canadian armoured fighting vehicles animal names, the proposed tank was named after the skink, Ontario's only lizard.

The Canadian Ministry of Munitions and Supply had the turret designed in-house by its Army Engineering Design Branch (AEDB) with help from the Inspection Board. The Waterloo Manufacturing Co. in Waterloo, Ontario, was given the task of building a preliminary wooden mock-up. This was completed on 18 September 1943. The construction of two welded armour pilot turrets was then authorized. The first pilot turret was demonstrated in mid-December. In January 1944 a pilot turret was successfully tested on a Grizzly chassis. Due to the challenges of welding a turret of such a complex shape from Rolled homogeneous armour plate, Dominion Foundries of Hamilton was contracted to produce a fully enclosed cast turret (One of the largest armour castings ever made in Canada).

Originally it was planned to arm the Skink with four 20 mm Hispano-Suiza cannons as used on aircraft and the first prototypes were so armed. In January 1944, the 21st Army Group in Europe decided that only British 20 mm Polsten guns would be used (the Polsten was a simplified version of the Oerlikon cannon) by its units. This required a redesign of the turret, which was completed in April. This change delayed the project by 3 to 4 months, while 21st Army Group's reduction in the number of AA guns to be issued to its units led to a reduction in the number of Skink turrets which were required. This dwindled to zero in late July 1944, when 21 Army Group decided that as the German air force - the Luftwaffe - had been virtually eliminated over North West Europe, there was no longer a requirement for self-propelled anti-aircraft guns. The Skink contract was cancelled in mid-August and only three complete vehicles and eight turret kits were completed.

== Design ==
The Skink's four 20 mm guns could fire 650 rounds per minute per gun. A modified Oilgear hydraulic traverse with two pumps could rotate the turret at up to 65° per second and - crucially for a quick response- - accelerate from rest to 60° in two seconds. The guns’ elevation was also hydraulically assisted so the guns could move at up to 45° per second in an arc from -5° to +80°. The gunner controlled both elevation and rotation with a joystick, and used a Mk.IX reflector sight. Initially it was planned to build 300 Skink turrets for the Canadian and British armies. One Skink was sent to Britain for evaluation and was then sent to France for field trials with the First Canadian Army.

During testing, several problems were found. The switch from Oerlikon to Polsten guns caused several issues. Alterations to the turret would have to be made in order to use belt-fed Polstens. As this was not acceptable, it relegated ammunition feed to magazine only and then from 30 round magazines as 60 round magazines were too large. These guns could also only be fed from the left side. Canadian ammunition often caused issues, unlike British and American ammunition. The magazines themselves were not well made and did not line up precisely with the guns. The gunner had to put his head out of the turret hatch when firing, exposing him to danger. Gaps around the gun mantlets allowed for splash damage, as did a 2.5 mm gap under each gun. Hydraulics performed poorly, but worked better after being rebuilt. The sight was found to be wobbly. Many of the smaller problems, such as the elevation mechanism ramming into the gun mount, were fixed during the trials.

== Combat Use ==
The prototype Skink sent to the United Kingdom for trials was the only one to see combat after it was transferred to the 2nd Canadian Armoured Brigade. From 6 February to 11 March 1945, the Skink visited all but one of the Canadian armoured regiments - from Nijmegen to the Cleve area - frequently engaging the German army. All units found it to be a valuable asset but no enemy aircraft presented itself to the Skink's guns and its main function was to flush out stubborn pockets of enemy infantry and force their surrender. At one point a burst from its guns convinced 45 German troops to surrender, despite only 10 having been wounded. The vehicle did not carry armor piercing ammunition and did not engage with other tanks. It was sent back to the UK on March 25, 1945. The remaining Skink pilots and the completed turrets went into long-term storage in Canada where, at some point, they were scrapped. Only some unfinished turret castings salvaged from the firing range survive.

== See also ==
- Crusader Mk. III, AA Mk. II / Mk. III
- T77 Multiple Gun Motor Carriage
- Semovente da 20/70 quadruplo
- Wirbelwind
