= Townsend Thunderbird =

General information
- Type: Homebuilt aircraft
- National origin: United States of America
- Designer: Gid Townsend
- Number built: 1

History
- First flight: 1956
- Developed from: BT-13

The Townsend Thunderbird is a homebuilt design created by the experienced cropduster Gid Townsend and built in 1956 with assistance of Curtis Pitts.

== Design ==
The Thunderbird is powered by a 245 hp (183 kW) Jacobs radial engine with a constant speed propeller. The horizontal stabilizer and aluminum wings are the outer panels of a Vultee BT-13 trainer. The engine cowl is from a Cessna UC-78. The fuselage is welded tubing with fabric covering. The landing gear is from a Cessna 180.

== Operational history ==
By 1974 the prototype was unflyable. The aircraft was later metalized, the turtledeck was removed, and it was converted to use a Wright R-975 radial engine.

== Specifications (Townsend Thunderbird) ==
Data from Experimenter

General characteristics

- Capacity: 2
- Length: 21 ft 2 in (6.45 m)
- Wingspan: 27 ft 5 in (8.36 m)
- Height: 6 ft 6 in (1.98 m)
- Wing area: 120 sq ft (11 m^{2})
- Empty weight: 1,800 lb (816 kg)
- Fuel capacity: 50 gal
- Powerplant: 1 × Wright R-975 radial, 450 hp (340 kW)

Performance

- Maximum speed: 210 kn (240 mph, 390 km/h)
- Cruise speed: 132 kn (152 mph, 245 km/h)
- Stall speed: 65 kn (75 mph, 121 km/h)
- Rate of climb: 1,500 ft/min (7.6 m/s)
