= KhTZ-16 =

Soviet improvised armoured vehicle

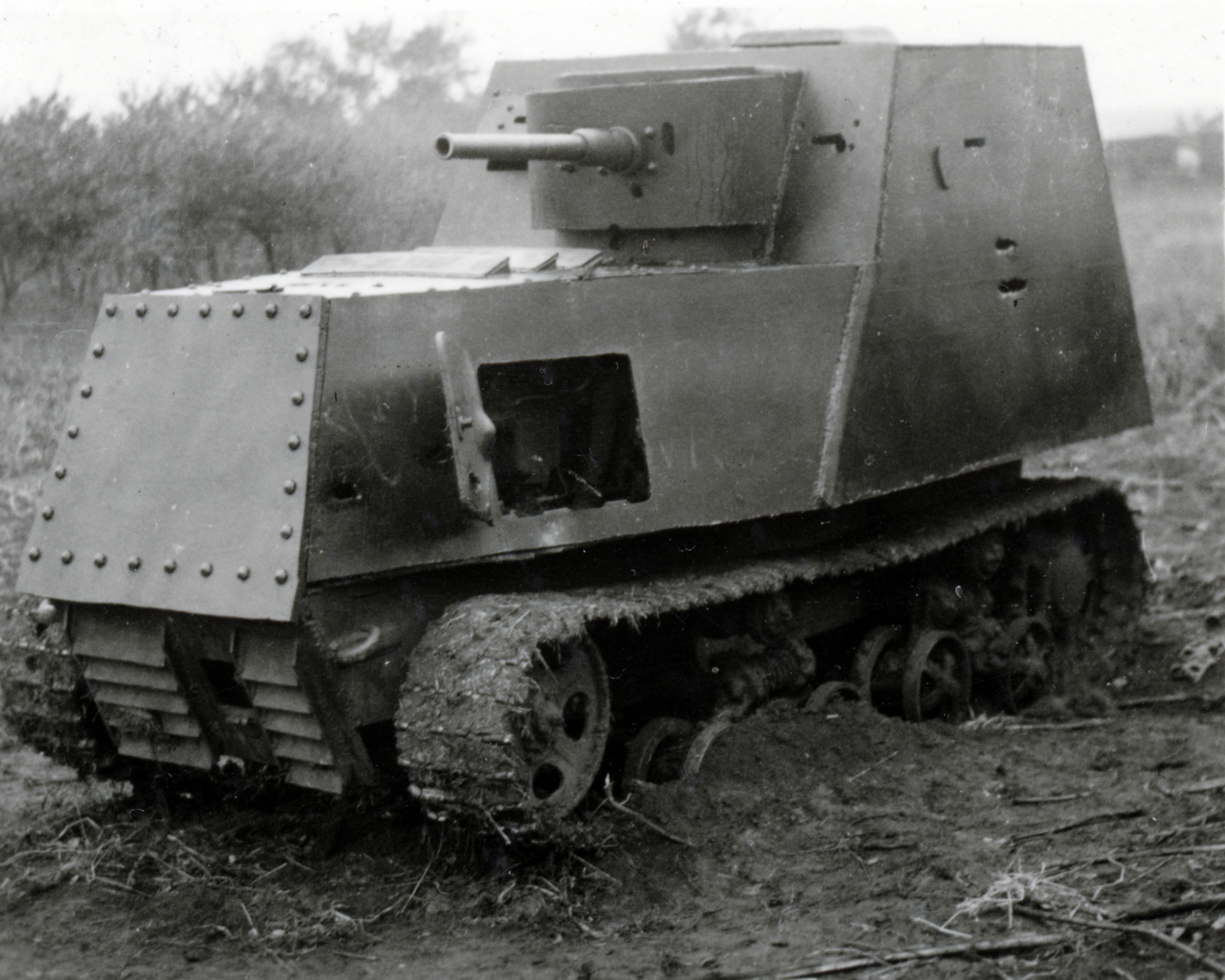
Abandoned KhTZ-16 in 1942

The KhTZ-16 (Russian: ХТЗ-16) (after the Kharkiv Tractor Factory; Ukrainian: Харківський Тракторний Завод) was a Soviet improvised fighting vehicle of the Second World War, built on the chassis of an STZ-3 tractor. The vehicles were built in Kharkiv until the factory was evacuated to the east, at which time production moved to Stalingrad. Only around 70-90 were built. The vehicle was operated by a crew of two. At first a 37mm anti-aircraft gun was fitted, but after this was deemed unsatisfactory they were instead armed with a 45mm 20K anti-tank gun, as well as a 7.62mm Degtyarev light machine gun. Some vehicles were used in the fighting around Poltava in September 1941 and Kharkiv in October 1941, but were quickly lost in battle against Axis forces.

== See also ==
- Disston Tractor Tank
- Schofield tank
- NI tank
- Kubuś
- Bedford OXA
- Bob Semple tank

== Bibliography ==
- Zaloga, Steven J., James Grandsen (1984). Soviet Tanks and Combat Vehicles of World War Two, p. 142. London: Arms and Armour Press. ISBN 0-85368-606-8.
