= NI tank =

Improvised Soviet armoured fighting vehicle

NI
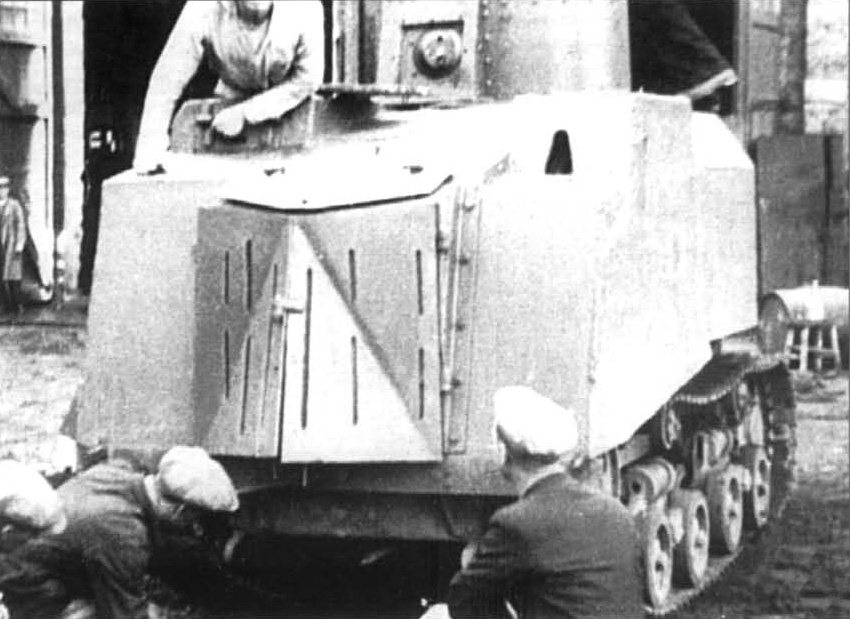
- An early version of NI-1 based on the STZ-5 tractor. August 20, 1941
- Type: Improvised fighting vehicle
- Place of origin: Soviet Union

Service history
- In service: 1941
- Used by: Soviet Union
- Wars: World War II

Production history
- Designed: 1941
- Manufacturer: January Uprising Mechanical Plant (Odessa)
- Produced: 1941
- No. built: 69

Specifications
- Mass: 7000 kg
- Length: 4.3m
- Width: 7.5m
- Height: 3m
- Crew: 2–3
- Engine: 1MA; 44 hp
- Operational range: 140 km
- Maximum speed: 7 kph

The NI tank also known as the Odessa tank (/ˈniː/; Russian: Танк НИ tank NI, abbr. На испуг, Na ispug, literally "for fright"), was a Soviet improvised fighting vehicle, based on an STZ-5 agricultural tractor, manufactured in Odessa during the Siege of Odessa in World War II.

== Development ==
NI-1 Diagram: 1 — armoured hull, 2 — side armour, 3 — engine compartment, 4 — turret, 5 — fenders, 6 — track armour, 7 — machine gun armour, 8 — DShK machine gun, 9 — hook, 10 — toolbox, 11 — exhaust pipe, 12 — chassis beams, 13 — chassis front, 14 — tow hitch, 15 — idler, 16 — support roller, 17 — driving wheel, 18 — roller, 19 — DT machine gun

At the beginning of the war between the Axis and the Soviet Union, a majority of the factories were evacuated, including most of the equipment from the January Uprising Factory. There was machinery left and it was decided that it would be used to service battle-damaged tanks arriving from the front.

When the army fighting on the outskirts of Odessa (the city defences held out for seventy-two days before the army pulled back) started experiencing shortages in tanks, the workers from the factory decided to build a fighting vehicle of their own design. Aided by the workers from other factories, the workers of the January Uprising factory built a large metal box and mounted it on the tractor. Also added was a traversable turret with either a mountain gun or a large-calibre machine gun. The armour was a sandwich of thin naval steel or boiler plate and wood or rubber sheeting to improve protection against small arms. The resulting machine was one of the many different improvised fighting vehicles developed during the war; however it was unlike any other fighting vehicle of the time due to its sizeable production and loud noise when it moved.

Armament was varied to whatever was on hand during the siege. The first model produced used a modified T-26 tank turret, with a Degtyaryov machine gun in place of the 45mm gun that the T-26 carried. It's possible that turrets from the T-37A tank and T-38 tank were used, but these might have been improvised turrets instead, or modified from the original due to the placement of the side viewport in comparison to the standard turret. Photos exist of improvised turrets being mounted. One source states that 37mm mountain guns and 45mm anti-tank guns were fitted as acquired.

== Production history ==
During the siege of Odessa, a total of 69 NI tanks were produced. These then fought during the siege against the Axis forces in support of Soviet troops. To reinforce and replace losses this in turn created NI tanks. The design of the tank was based on a tractor model STZ-5 series. Base box structure helped to protect the soldiers. Transversal turret was placed on the armoured hull of the tank. Sometimes old turrets were use from damaged tanks. Power came from a 1MA-4 cylinder gasoline engine with 44 horse power, but it proved to be noisy and slow.

== Combat use ==
68 NI tanks (all but one) were captured by the Axis-aligned Romanians by the end of the siege, with 14 still being on hand as of 1 November 1942.

== See also ==
=== Tanks of comparable role, performance, and era ===
- American Disston Tractor Tank
- New Zealand Bob Semple tank
- New Zealand Schofield tank
- Soviet KhTZ-16
