= Disston Tractor Tank =

American tank model

The Disston Tractor Tank, also called the Six-Ton Tractor Tank, was an American light tank of the mid 1930s. It was cheap to make, but few were sold as it was primitive and markedly inferior to the other light tanks of the era.

== Development ==
The tank was created as a joint venture by the Caterpillar Corporation and the Disston Saw Works. Caterpillar provided the chassis, which was from a standard Caterpillar Model 35 civilian tractor, and Disston provided the tank body, which was bolted on to the Caterpillar chassis. The Caterpillar track was lengthened by adding a road wheel to the front of the track assembly, but some examples apparently do not have this lengthened track.

The Disston had a 37mm gun mounted in the body, and a turret with a .30 caliber (7.62 mm) light machine gun. It weighed about six tons, probably had a speed of 5 to 6.5 miles per hour (8 to 10.4 kilometres an hour), and had armor sufficient to stop small arms fire. The crew consisted of three men. At a cost of $21,000 (equivalent to $377,000 in 2024), the Disston was cheaper than similarly-armed tanks, but – being quite slow, with tracks unsuited for difficult terrain, thin armor, a high boxy superstructure, the engine exposed in the front, and only the secondary armament in a turret – was generally deemed unsatisfactory even so.

== Operational history ==
A few were sold and delivered to Afghanistan and entered service there. At the 2001 American occupation of Afghanistan some were found to still exist, in broken-down condition or in Afghan scrapyards. The vehicle was marketed to Kuwait, New Zealand and Romania, and perhaps some other countries, but there is no reliable evidence that any were sold.

== See also ==
- New Zealand Bob Semple tank
- Soviet NI tank
- New Zealand Schofield tank
- Soviet KhTZ-16
