= Bob Semple tank =

New Zealand improvised light tank

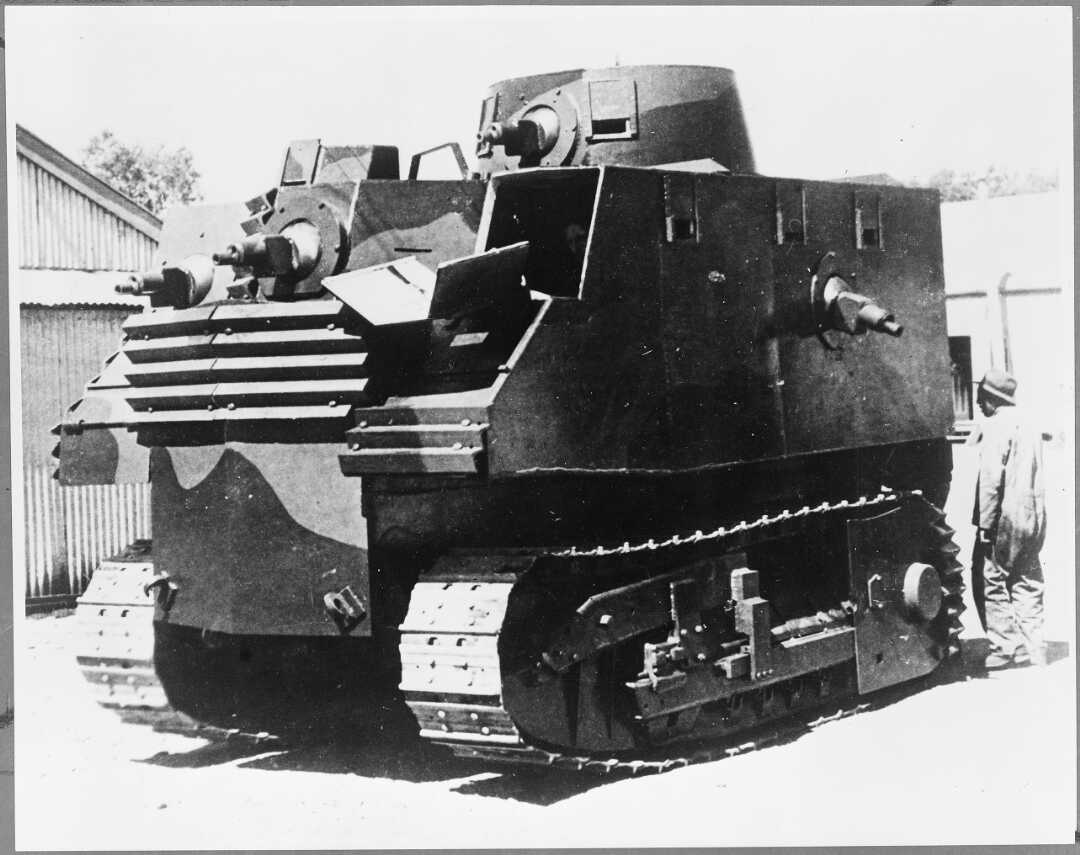
- Bob Semple tank
- Type: Light tank
- Place of origin: New Zealand

Production history
- Designer: Bob Semple
- Manufacturer: Ministry of Works, Temuka

Specifications
- Mass: 25.4 t (25.0 long tons)
- Length: 4.20 m (13 ft 9 in)
- Width: 3.30 m (10 ft 10 in)
- Height: 3.65 m (12 ft 0 in)
- Crew: 6-8 on
- Armor: 8–12 mm (0.31–0.47 in)
- Main armament: 6× 0.303 in (7.7 mm) Bren light machine guns
- Engine: 6-cylinder diesel 95 kW (127 hp)
- Power/weight: 5 hp/t
- Operational range: 160 km (99 mi)
- Maximum speed: 24 km/h (15 mph)

The Bob Semple tank was a light tank designed by Bob Semple, the New Zealand minister of works during World War II. Originating out of the need to build military hardware from available materials, the tank was built from corrugated iron on a tractor base. Designed and built during a period of uncertainty in which New Zealand feared having to defend itself from Japanese invasion without external assistance, these tanks were a civilian effort to design and create a means to protect New Zealand.

Designed and built without formal plans or blueprints, it had numerous design flaws and practical difficulties, and was never put into mass production or used in combat.

== Design and construction ==
At the onset of the Second World War, New Zealand—like its neighbour Australia—had no indigenous armoured fighting vehicle industry, and it was expected that armoured fighting vehicles would be imported from Britain. Although Australia and New Zealand had some heavy industry that could be turned to the production of armour and armoured vehicles, little such preparation had been done. The idea of mechanising the New Zealand Army had been suggested before the war but without much progress. The use of the American Disston "Six Ton Tractor Tank", a 1937 vehicle constructed of an armoured box on a Caterpillar Model 35 chassis which had been sold to Afghanistan, was suggested.

New Zealand had built some improvised armoured trucks, and unable to get any tracked carriers from Australia, were building their own with armour plate imported from Australia. After the Fall of France in mid-1940, and the loss of most British tanks there, there was no likelihood of production being spared for New Zealand. Rather than obtain the armoured superstructures from America, they decided to produce their own using local materials and resources.

It was decided that a 'tractor-tank' would be an adequate design; if the need for defence arose, a large tank superstructure could be bolted upon a tractor base within a few hours, allowing for quick transformation and deployment of the tanks.

The first (mild steel) prototype was built on a Caterpillar D8 crawler tractor, a type which was readily available. The Public Works Department had 81 D8s, and another 19 were available. A lack of weapons meant that it was equipped with six Bren light machine guns — one in each side, two facing the front, one in the turret and one at the rear. The vehicle was very tall at 12 ft (3.5 m) and performance was poor. Due to the lack of armour plate, corrugated (manganese) plating was used in the expectation it would deflect bullets. The crew of eight included one gunner who had to lie on a mattress on top of the engine to fire his Bren gun.

The tanks were constructed without the use of any formal plans or blueprints. Working from an American postcard depicting the conversion of a tractor to a 'tractor-tank', Bob Semple and TG Beck (Christchurch District Works Engineer), improvised the design of the tanks. Using resources available to Bob Semple as Minister of Public Works, work on the first tank commenced at the PWD's Temuka workshops in June 1940. The additional two were built at the NZR Addington Workshops. The first cost £5,902, and the second and third together cost £4,323, for a total cost of £10,225 (although the Army was only billed £3,414).

The intention was to disperse the hulls at locations ready in case of a Japanese invasion at which point they would be mounted on tractors for use. The idea was discarded after the tanks attracted public ridicule; however, Bob Semple stood by his design and even stated "I don’t see anyone else coming up with any better ideas."

== Handling and performance ==
Due to the limitations of requirements and resources, the tank was a functional failure. By using a large tractor as a base, and bolting on a hastily designed and poorly constructed tank superstructure, the resultant tanks were inadequately armoured, extremely heavy (20–25 ton), unstable, restricted by tractor gearing to slow speeds, and had to stop to change gears. Furthermore, due to the shape of the underlying tractor and undue vibrations, shooting from the tank was both difficult and inevitably inaccurate. These limitations have caused the Bob Semple Tank to frequently make lists of "worst ever tanks".

== Final result ==
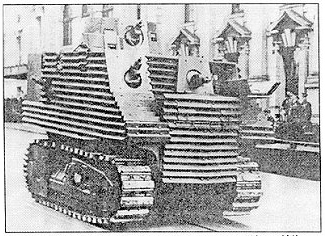
Bob Semple tank on parade

In the end, due to their impracticality, the tanks were disposed of by the Army. They had been given Army serial numbers NZ6292 (held at Papakura) and NZ3494 & NZ3495 (held at Burnham). Only one went to the Pacific in 1944, after having its armour stripped. It is possible that the Bob Semple tank could have been potentially useful in battle, as it was planned to have a 37 mm anti-tank gun rather than the Bren gun in the turret; the armour was also bullet-resistant to some degree, so it might have been at least somewhat effective in the event of an invasion.

== See also ==
- Disston Tractor Tank – American production tank based on a tractor
- NI Tank – Soviet improvised tank design based on a tractor
- KhTZ-16 – Another Soviet improvised tractor tank
- Schofield tank – New Zealand indigenous tank design
- Sentinel tank – Australian indigenous tank design
- Plastic armour – contemporary ersatz armour of asphalt concrete
