= CN 90 F4 =

French tank gun

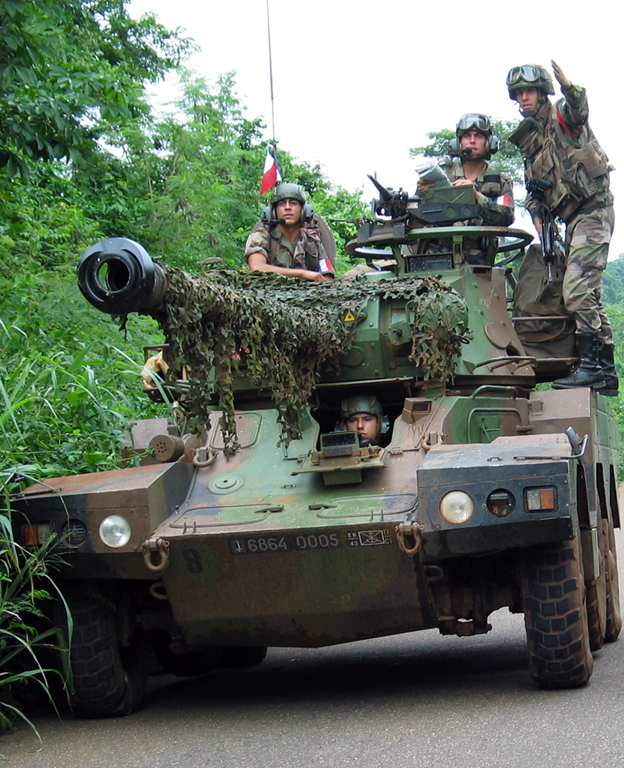
A French ERC 90 F4 Sagaie in the Ivory Coast

The CN 90 F4 (French: CanoN de 90 millimètres Modèle F4; English: 90 millimeters gun F4 Model), also marketed under the name of Super 90, is a French rifled 90 mm tank gun produced by Giat Industries.

It is fitted to the ERC 90 F4 Sagaie variant of the Panhard ERC armoured car.

== Additional specifications ==
- Overall length: 5.74 m
- Barrel length: 4.68 m
- Rifling length: 4.022 m
- Rifling twist: 25°
- Number of grooves: 60
- Muzzle brake:single baffle
- Maximum recoil length: 550 mm
- Maximum service chamber pressure: 210 MPa
- Overall weight: 602 kg (with armored gun shield)
- Recoiling gun mass: 422 kg

=== Current operators ===
- Ivory Coast
- Nigeria
- Gabon
- Oman

== See also ==
CN 90 F2
CN 90 F3
