= Post–World War II Sherman tanks =

M4A4 Sherman V (early)
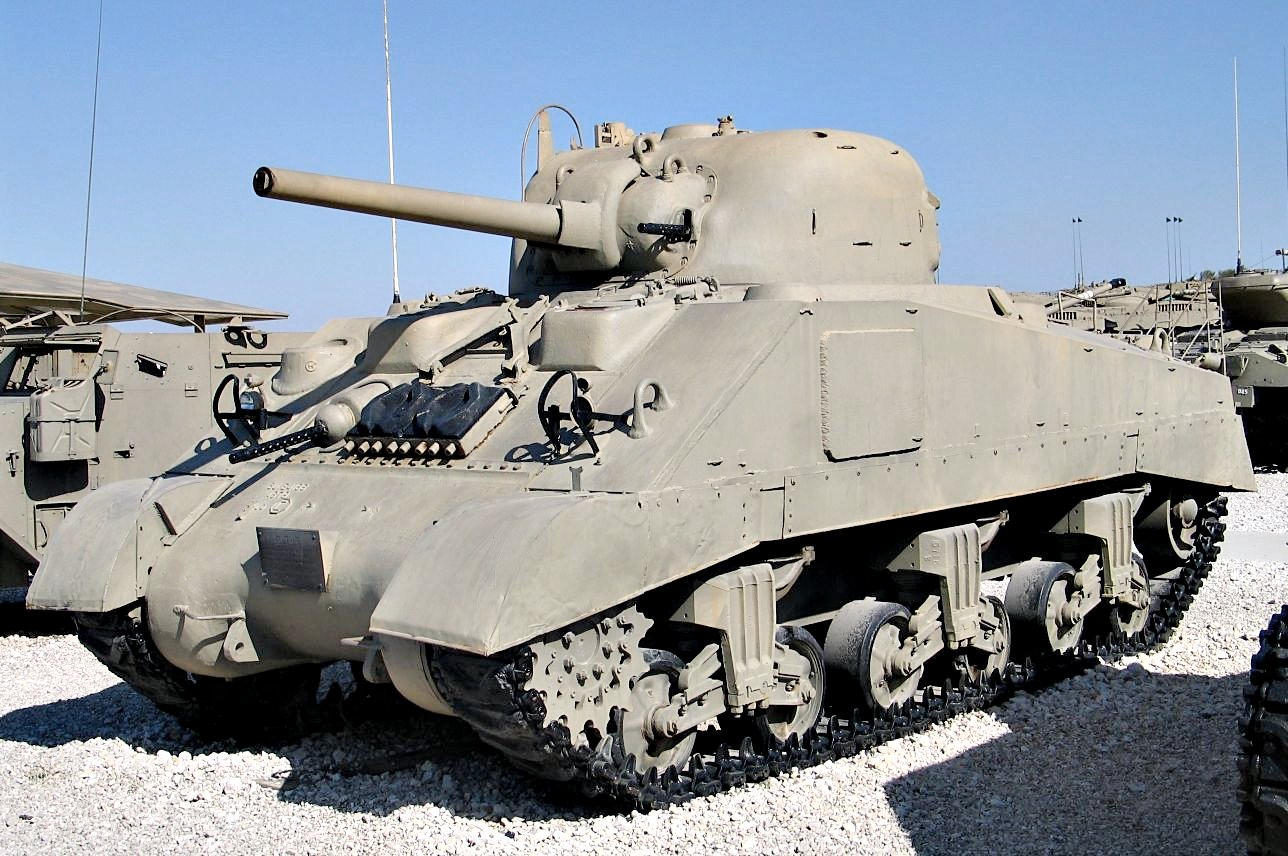
- Medium Tank M4A4 Sherman V, a major export type during World War II, in Yad la-Shiryon Museum, Israel.
- Type: Medium tank
- Place of origin: United States

Service history
- Wars: World War II

Production history
- Produced: July 1942 – November 1943
- No. built: 7,499

Specifications
- Mass: 31.6 tonnes (67,000 lbs)
- Length: 6.06 m (19 ft 11 in)
- Width: 2.62 m (8 ft 7 in)
- Height: 2.74 m (9.0 ft)
- Crew: 5
- Armor: 13–76 mm (0.5–3.0 in)
- Main armament: 75 mm M3 L/40 Gun; 97 rounds
- Secondary armament: 1× .50 cal Browning M2HB machinegun 300 rounds 2× .30-06 Browning M1919A5 machineguns 4,750 rounds
- Engine: Chrysler A57, 30 cylinder gasoline 425 hp gross @ 2,850 rpm 370 hp net @ 2,400 rpm
- Power/weight: 13.4 hp/tonne
- Suspension: Vertical Volute Spring Suspension (VVSS)
- Ground clearance: 430 mm (17 in)
- Fuel capacity: 160 US gal (606 L)
- Operational range: 161 km (100 mi) with 160 gal/80 octane
- Maximum speed: 40.2 km/h (25 mi/h) (brief level)

This article deals with Sherman tanks extensive use around the world after World War II and catalogues foreign post–World War II use and conversions of Sherman tanks and variants based on the Sherman chassis.

== Variant history ==
=== US Sherman tanks as foreign military aid ===
- E4/E6 Shermans – Two of what would become the last of the US-produced Sherman tank variants. During the early 1950s, US Ordnance military depots and/or outsourced private civilian contractors installed the 76 mm M1 tank gun in the older small-type turret (designed for the original 75 mm M3 tank gun) of M4A1 and M4A3 Shermans. The USA provided these M4A1E6(76) or M4A3E4(76) Shermans to its various allies and friendly and pro-USA states in Europe and Asia (Denmark, India and Yugoslavia received M4A3E4s and Pakistan received M4A1E6s).
- HVSS-type Shermans – The USA also fitted many of their postwar stocks of Sherman tanks with the more advanced Horizontal Volute Spring Suspension (HVSS) system (replacing the earlier Vertical Volute Spring Suspension (VVSS) system) and this upgraded feature would be typically noted after the main vehicle's designation (for instance, an M4A2(76)W HVSS).

=== Canadian ===
- Sherman Badger – Canada's replacement of its Ram Badger Flame tank, the Sherman Badger was a turretless M4A2 HVSS Sherman with Wasp IIC flamethrower in place of hull machine gun, developed sometime from 1945 to 1949. The 150 gallons at 250 psi was effective to 125 yards, with elevation of +30 to -10 degrees and traverse of 30 degrees left and 23 degrees right. This inspired the US T68.
- Sherman Kangaroo – From late World War II to the 1960s, Canada converted/used some Grizzlies (M4A1 Shermans made in Canada with different tracks and radios in 1943), at least one very similar Skink (prototype Anti-aircraft-gun on the Grizzly hull), and M4A2(76)W HVSS Shermans to Kangaroo armored personnel carriers (APCs).

=== Mexican ===
- M32 Chenca – In 1998, Napco International of the USA upgraded M32B1 TRV Sherman-chassis armoured recovery vehicles with Detroit Diesel 8V-92-T diesel engines.

=== Indian ===
Indian units equipped with Sherman Vs fought in Burma. These Sherman Vs were kept in service with the Indian Army after independence and were in use well into the 1960s. India also bought 200 surplus M4A3E4(76)s from the US stocks in the 1950s. Some Indian M4s were modified locally with the French 75 mm CN 75-50 cannon and some other with the Soviet 76 mm D-85 cannon. These modifications tried to benefit from the guns of AMX-13 and PT-76 tanks also used by Indian Army. Shermans remained in service with the Indian Army until 1971.

- Sherman VA/M4A4(76) – although never a US production type (the 1950s US rearming with 76 mm guns was limited to M4A1 and M4A3), at least one source claims that India had one regiment partly equipped with Sherman V (British/Indian designation of M4A4) with 76 mm guns (the type of the gun is not specified but British practice added an A suffix to denote the 76 mm). India did receive the upgunned M4A3E4.
- Upgunned Sherman – two regiments of Shermans re-armed with the French 75 mm gun from the AMX-13 and referred to as upgunned Shermans.

=== Argentina ===
- Repotenciado – Conversions of British Sherman VC and IC Hybrid to include a diesel engine and a new armament suite, the 105 mm FTR L44/57 gun (an Argentine licensed copy of the CN-105-57 Gun used on the AMX-13), a co-axial MAG-58 machine gun, and turret pintle-mounted M2HB machine gun. (Surviving Argentinian Sherman "repotenciado").

=== Chilean ===
- M50/60 – Converted Israeli M50 Shermans, which not having guns fitted at time of purchase were refitted with the IMI-OTO 60 mm High Velocity Medium Support (HVMS) gun. Claimed to be the very last fighting Shermans, they remained in Chilean service until 1999, when they were replaced by the Leopard 1V and AMX-30B2.

=== Egyptian ===
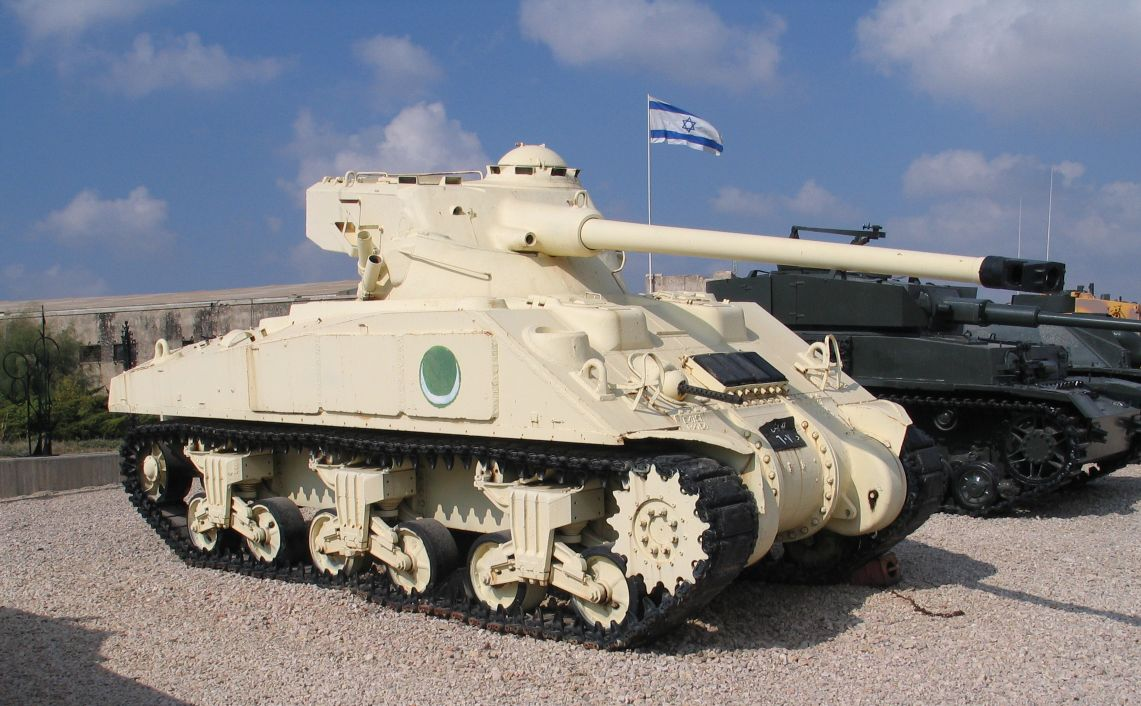
Egyptian M4A4 fitted with the AMX-13's FL-10 turret.

Egypt is one of the least-known users of the Sherman. Egyptian Sherman tanks saw limited combat in the Arab-Israeli wars in 1956, 1967 and 1973. This included a local version which was installed with a French AMX-13 tank's 75 mm gun turret. In all, Egypt only had a small number of Sherman tanks, probably less than 150 total. Most Shermans in their service with of the M4A4 variant, purchased from the British military forces in Egypt after WWII.

- M4A4 with FL-10 Turret – M4A4 fitted with the diesel engine of M4A2 and the FL-10 turret of the French AMX-13 light tank.

=== Israeli ===
At its birth, Israel had a limited number of armored vehicles, mostly scout cars and truck chassis hastily converted into armored cars. Israeli tank force consisted of old French Hotchkiss H-39 tanks and better tanks were desperately needed. Israelis searched junkyards in Palestine, Europe, and as far away as the Philippines looking for tanks. In Palestine, in a repair depot near the city of Tira, one or two ex-British rusted Shermans were found. In Italy 32 Shermans armed with 105 mm howitzers were found and smuggled back to Israel, as tractors. Since these tanks came from junkyards, they were generally unserviceable and required extensive work. Some of the Italian tanks had been demilitarized and the Shermans required hard work before being delivered to the Israeli Army. After the United Nations cease-fire Israelis assembled all the leftover World War II matériel they had. Most of the tanks in service were a varied assortment of Shermans, 32 tanks with only one Sherman lost in combat. The Israelis gave the designation of M1 to its entire Sherman force. They were standardized by re-arming them with M3 guns, but still a mixture of different features existed, and additional Shermans arrived from the Philippines.

More tanks were needed by Israel. By coincidence Israel found France willing to sell surplus Shermans and provide military assistance. About 60 surplus 76mm Shermans and spare parts and equipment was received, so two new armored Sherman brigades were created. In 1956 Israel requested France to supply 100 improved M50 Shermans, equipped with long-barreled 75mm high-velocity cannon. Many of the Egyptian tanks in the Sinai peninsula were also Shermans, so captured ones joined Israeli army. France developed the M51 Super Sherman, with a 105 mm cannon with lower recoil in a modified turret. Some 200 of Israel's 300 Shermans were modified to this version.

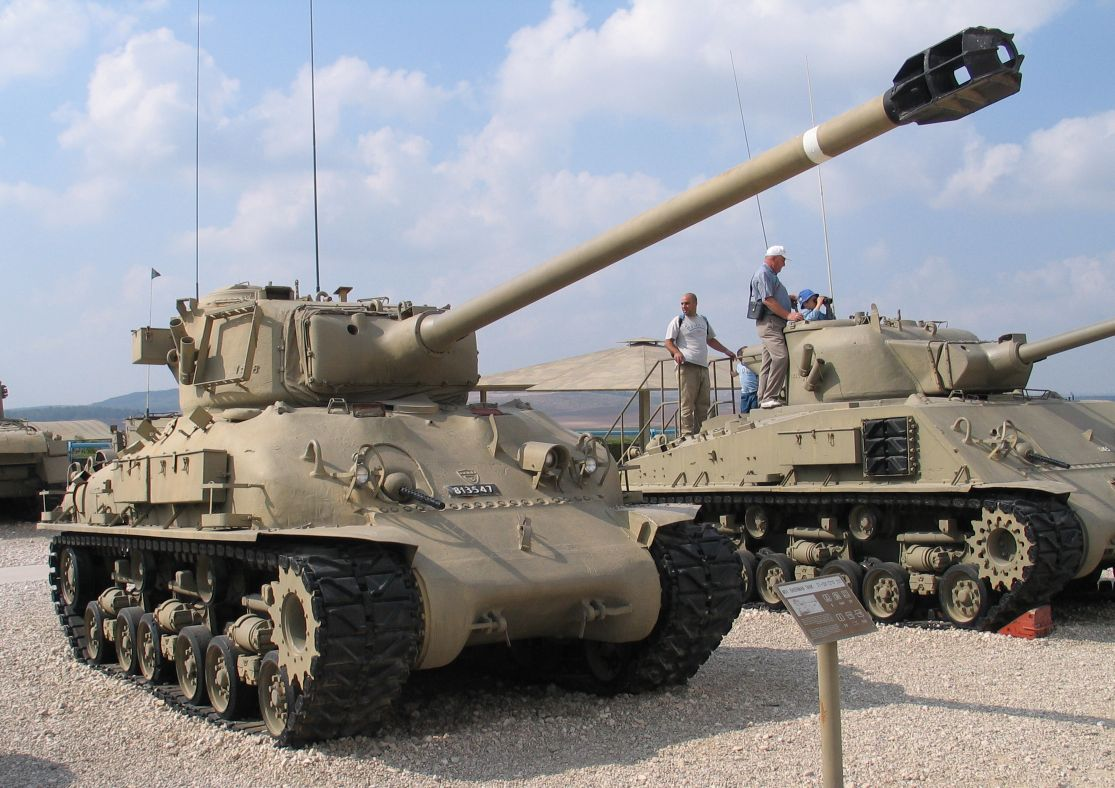
IDF M51 Sherman with 105 mm gun.

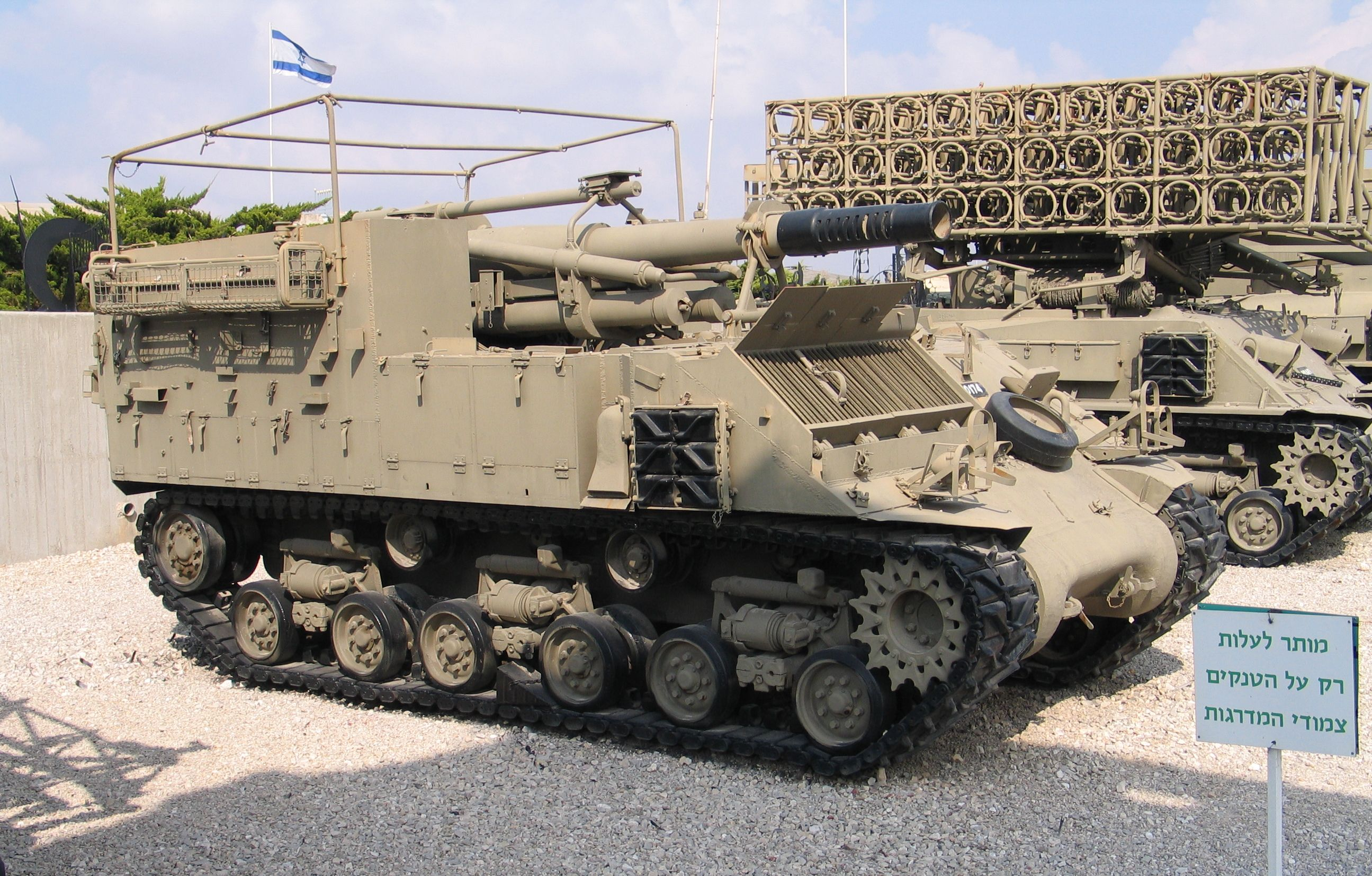
IDF M-50 self-propelled howitzer. Behind is IDF MAR-240 side-looking rocket launcher.

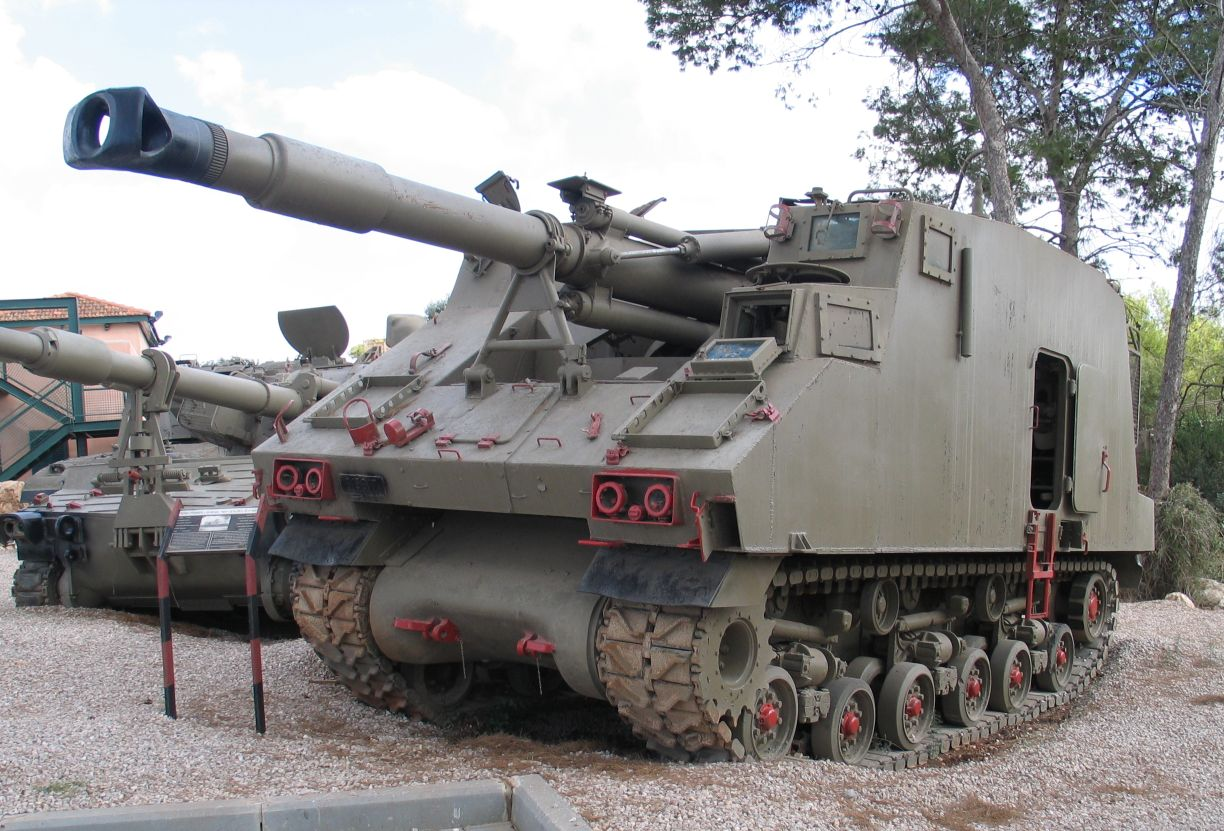
IDF L-33 / Ro'em.

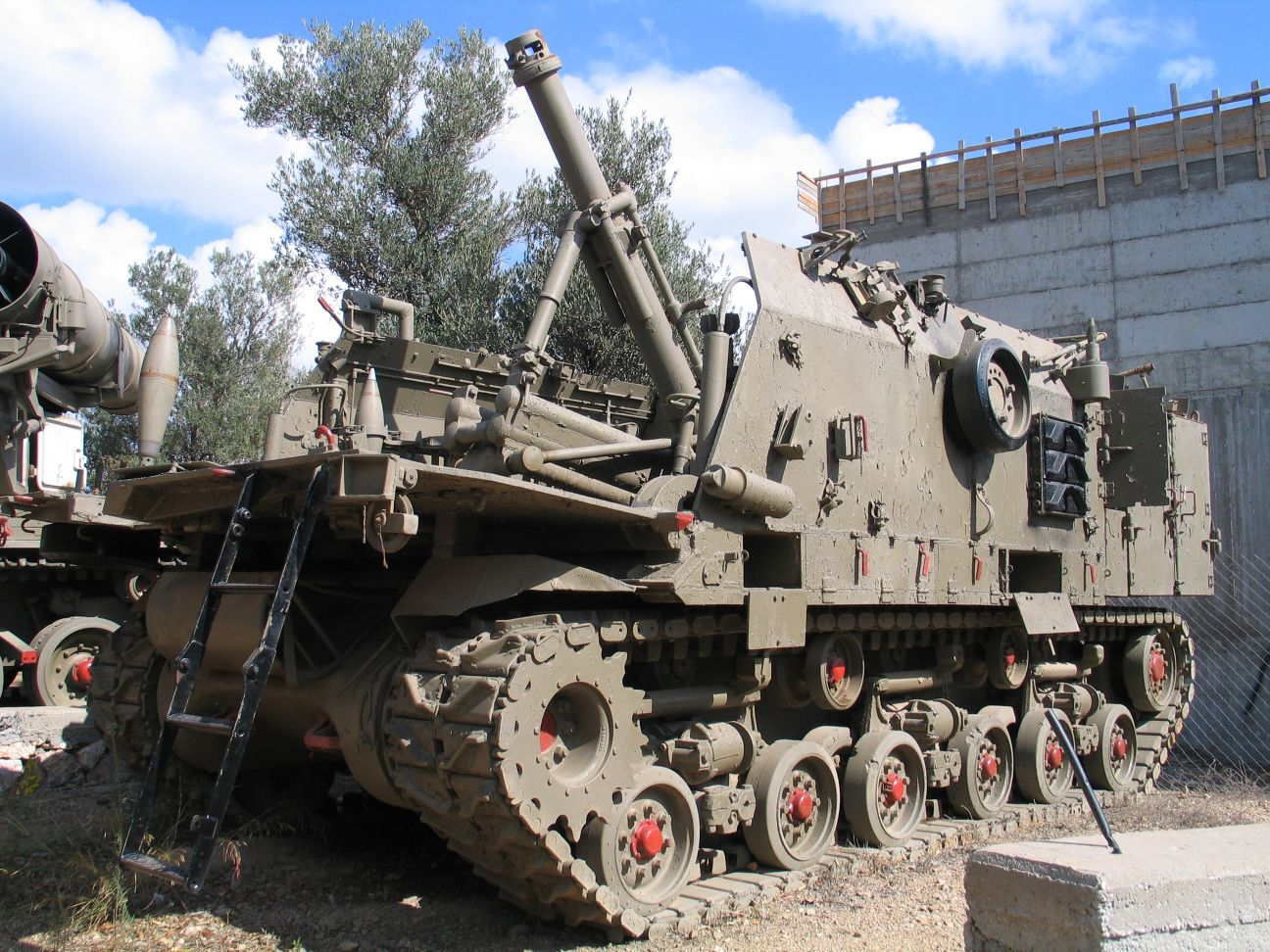
IDF Makmat 160 mm.

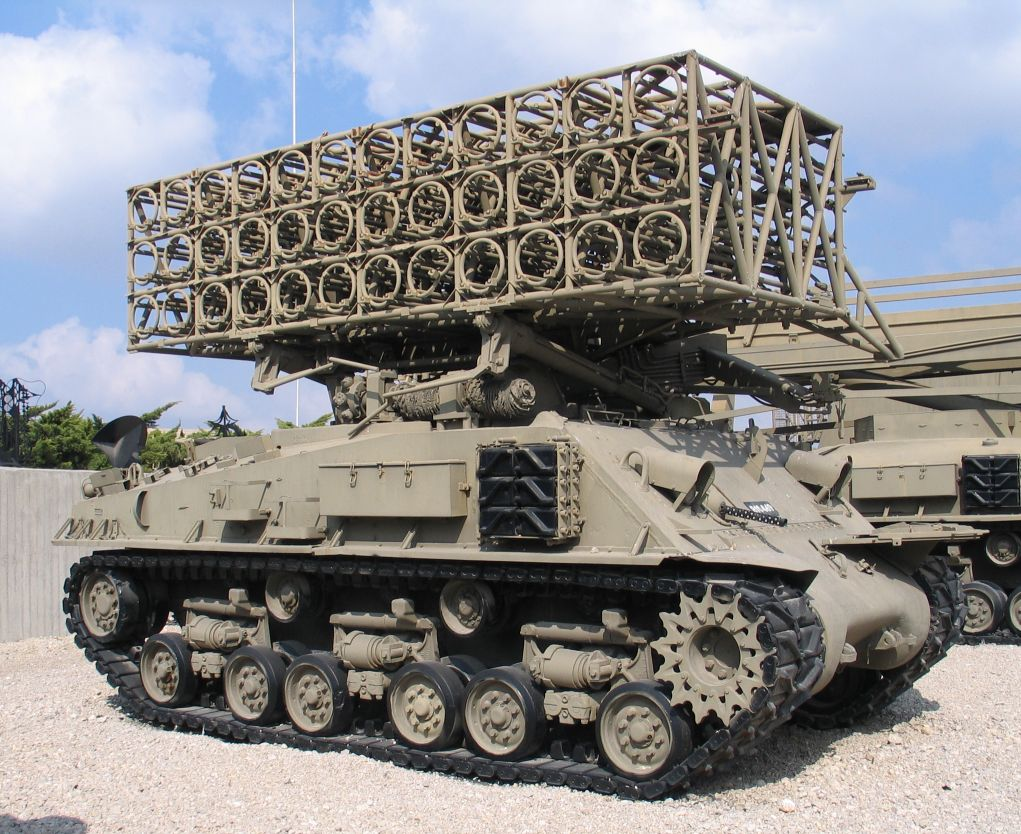
IDF MAR-240 with side-looking launcher for 36 240 mm rockets.

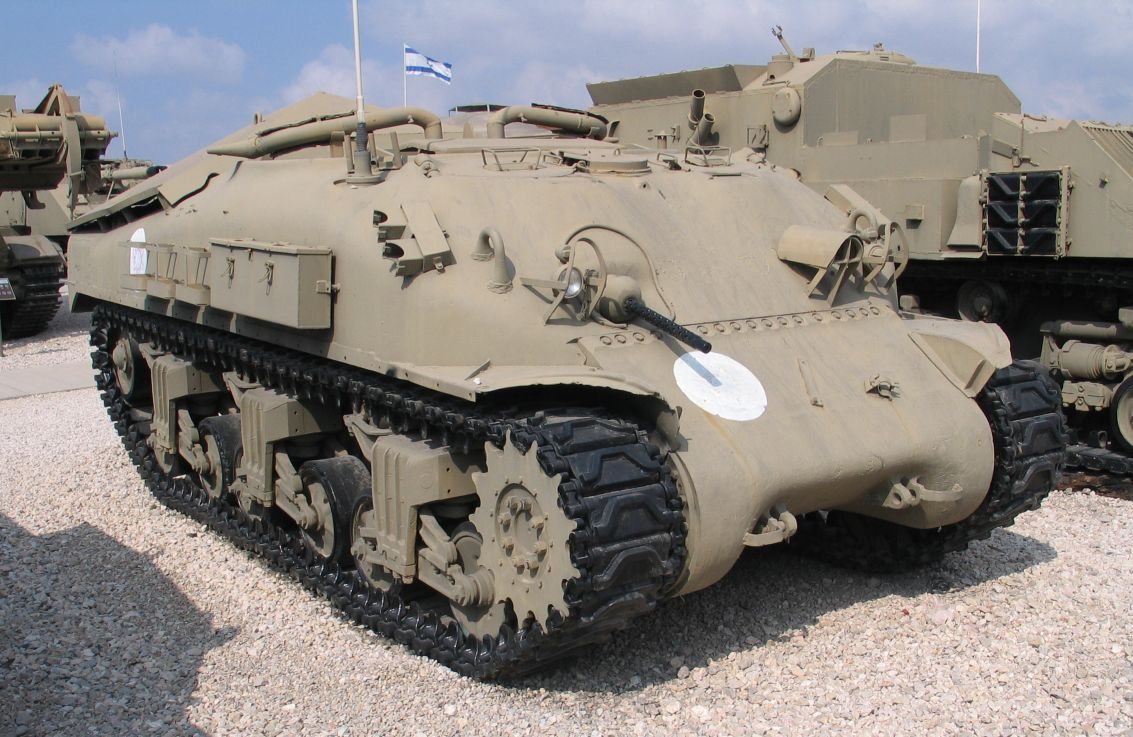
IDF Ambutank, VVSS version.

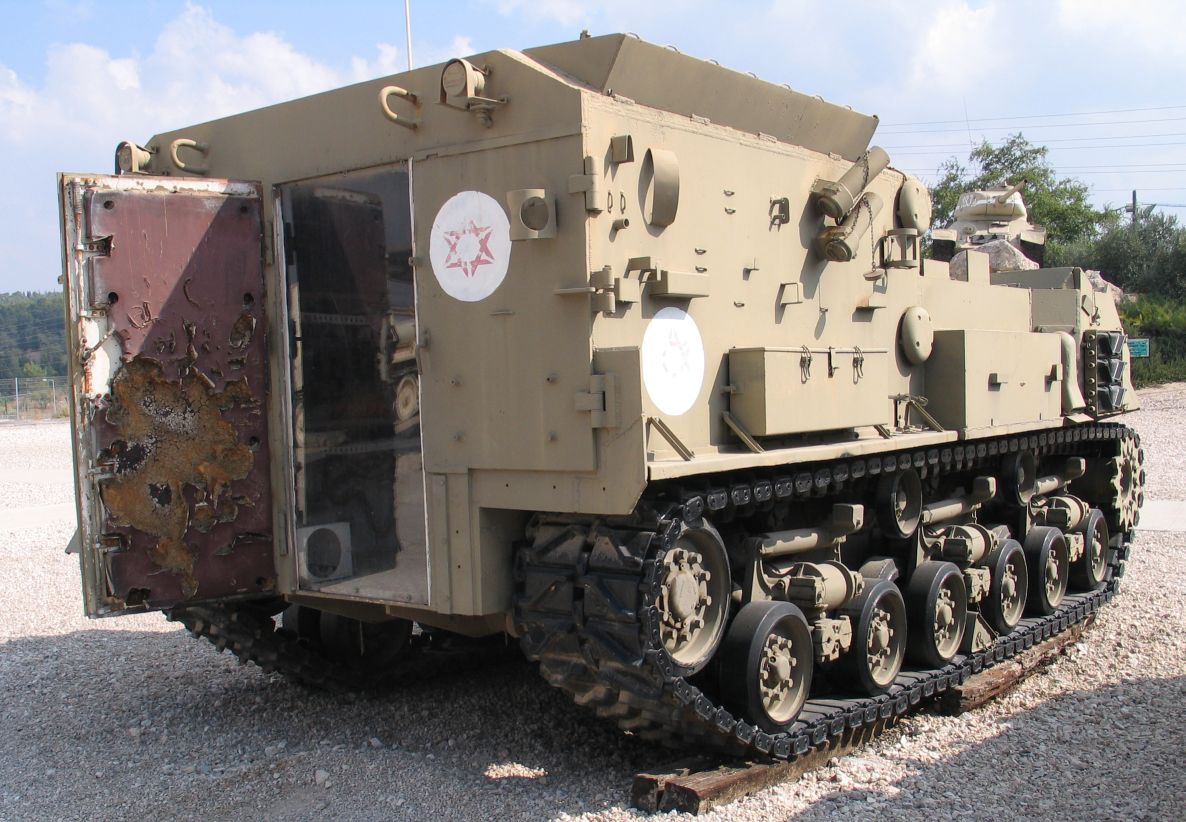
IDF Ambutank, HVSS version.

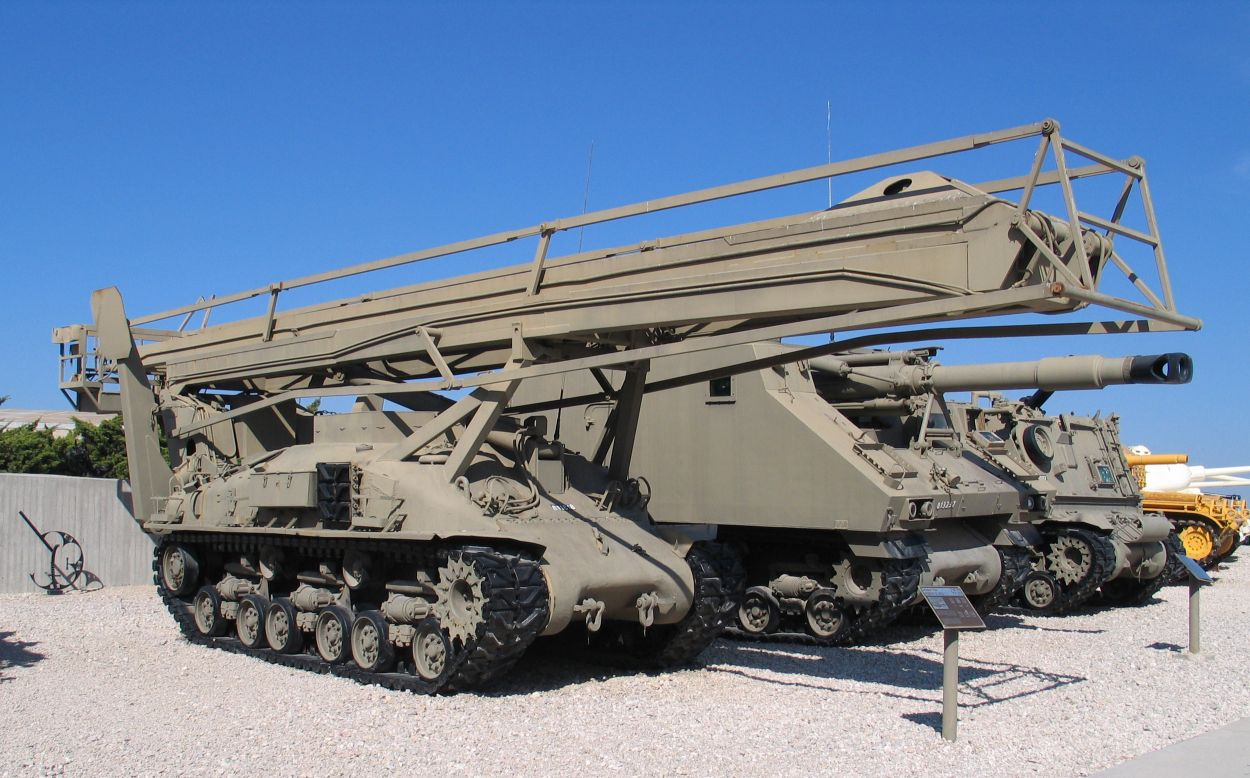
IDF Eyal observation post vehicle.

==== Gun tanks ====
- Sherman (Krupp) – Six early salvaged Shermans had a Krupp 75 mm field gun to replace the original gun destroyed during post–World War II scrapping. Later these tanks were rearmed with 105 mm M4 howitzers.
- Sherman M-1 – Israeli designation of any Sherman model armed with the 76 mm gun M1.
  - Super Sherman M-1 – Israeli designation of M4A1(76) fitted with HVSS suspension.
- Sherman M-3 (Sherman degem Alef prior to 1956) – Israeli designation of any Sherman model armed with the 75 mm gun M3.
- Sherman M-4 (Sherman degem Bet prior to 1956) – Israeli designation of any Sherman model armed with the 105 mm howitzer M4.
- Sherman M-50 – Upgraded Sherman with the French CN 75-50 75 mm gun, as used in the French AMX 13 light tank, in the "old" turret fitted with a counterweight. Entered service in 1956. Was used in the Suez Crisis (1956), the Six-Day War (1967) and the Yom Kippur War (1973). Sometimes colloquially misnamed as Super Sherman.
  - M-50 Continental – subvariant with Continental R-975 gasoline engine and VVSS suspension. 50 units converted.
  - M-50 Cummins – subvariant with Cummins diesel engine and HVSS suspension.
- Sherman M-51 – Upgraded M4A1 (HVSS) with improved engine and T23 turret modified to fit a shortened variant of the French 105 mm Modèle F1 gun with large muzzle brake. Was used in the Six Days War and the Yom Kippur War. Sometimes colloquially referred to as Isherman. About 100 of the remaining tanks of this model were sold to Chile in late 1970s, where they received a new engine and transmission in early 1990s. All of them were replaced by ex-Dutch Leopard 1V in late 1990s

==== Artillery tanks ====
See Rocket artillery for rocket/missile tank photos.

- M-50 155 mm – The M-50 was an open structured self-propelled artillery piece, mounting a single French Model 50 155 mm howitzer at the back of the hull, which was based on the "long" hull of M4A4 fitted with Continental engine (late production vehicles possibly used "short" hulls from other variants). The gun was developed in the early 1960s by Israeli Ordnance Corps in cooperation with France. Probably about 120 units were produced. In early 1970s M-50s were fitted with HVSS and Cummins diesel engines. It was used in the War of Attrition, Six Day War, Yom Kippur War and the 1982 Lebanon War. Some reserve units were armed with the M-50 at least until 1985.
- Ro'em (colloquially known as L-33) – A self-propelled artillery piece mounting Soltam M-68 155 mm L/33 howitzer in large enclosed superstructure. Uses Sherman chassis with Cummins VT-8-460Bi diesel engine and HVSS. Probably about 200 units were produced. The gun saw combat in the Yom-Kippur War and the 1982 Lebanon War. Currently out of active service.
- L-39 – Like L-33, but with longer (39 caliber) barrel. Apparently it was not adopted.
- Makmat 160 mm – Soltam M-66 160 mm mortar mounted on a Sherman chassis, in an open-topped compartment with folding front plate. It was adopted in 1968 and used in the War of Attrition, the Yom Kippur War and the 1982 Lebanon War.
- MAR-240 – In place of the turret, a side-facing launcher for 36 240 mm rockets was fitted. These were Israeli made copies of the Soviet rockets used by the BM-24 multiple launch rocket system. Apparently never reached mass production. MAR stands for Medium Artillery Rocket.
- Episkopi – Similar to MAR-240, but mounting a back-looking launcher for four 290 mm ground-to-ground rockets with high-explosive/fragmentation (Ivry-1) or cluster (Haviv) warhead. Was adopted in 1973, saw combat for the first time in the 1982 Lebanon War. Is colloquially known as MAR-290, and the name Ivry is also sometimes applied to the launching vehicle. An improved launcher on the Centurion tank chassis was later developed, but remained experimental. In the 1990s was replaced in active service by the M270 MLRS.
- Kilshon (Trident) or Kachlilit – The Kilshon was developed to reduce the losses suffered by SAM suppression aircraft by launching anti-radiation missiles (ARMs) from the ground. The Kilshon was based on turretless hull of the Sherman M-51 on which an AGM-45 Shrike ARM launcher was mounted. To deliver the desired range, a specially modified AGM-45 with booster was used. Later a prototype was developed for use with the AGM-78 Standard ARM, but with the retirement of Shermans from IDF service the Keres (Hook) system was placed onto a heavy truck chassis for the finalized design instead.

==== Support tanks ====
See Armoured recovery vehicle for TRV/ARV photo.

- Sherman Morag – Israeli designation of Sherman Crab mine flail vehicle.
- Trail Blazer (Gordon) – A recovery/engineering vehicle based on HVSS equipped M4A1s, it featured a large single boom crane (as opposed to the A-Frame of the M32) and large spades at the front and rear of the vehicle to assist in lifting. It could also tow up to 72 tons.
- Sherman Medical Evacuation Tank (Ambutank) – A radical conversion of the M4 with the turret removed and the powerplant (changed to a diesel engine) moved to the front of the tank. A medical team and four casualties could be carried in an armoured compartment at the rear. Early vehicles were based on M4A1 hulls with VVSS suspension and are often referred to as "VVSS version". Later vehicles used hulls with HVSS suspension and were fitted with a big boxy superstructure. This version is often referred to as "HVSS version". Many were used during the Israeli-Egyptian War of Attrition (1968–70) and the Yom Kippur War.
- Eyal Observation Post Vehicle – A Sherman that had the turret replaced with a 27 m (90 foot) tall hydraulically erected observation platform. This was used near the Suez Canal as a mobile observation post, before the Yom Kippur War.

=== Japan ===
- A single M4A3(76)W HVSS modified and tested with a T5309B turboshaft engine from 1969 to 1971.

=== Civilian variants ===
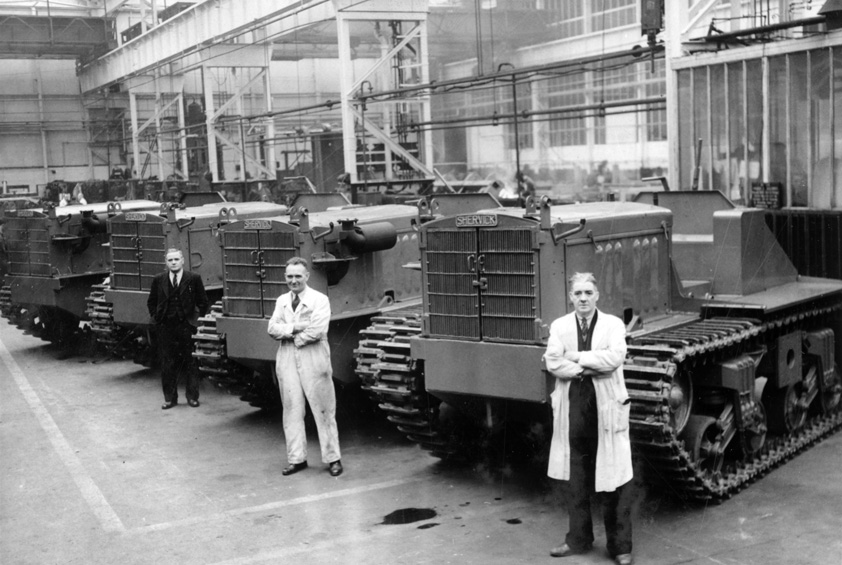
British Vickers Shervick Tractors in 1948

After World War II, demilitarized Shermans were widely available and relatively cheap. Many were heavily modified for use in the construction, forestry, and mining industries. Often, the turret and upper hull were completely removed and replaced with whatever equipment was required for the vehicle's new role.

The Finning Tank Drill, a rock drill used in logging road construction, was produced for many years in British Columbia, with the models M32F and M40F using Sherman chassis. The M32F utilized the standard M4 VVSS suspension while the M40F used the HVSS system. The earlier M4 tank drill used the M4 High Speed Tractor as a carrier. Traxxon also produced a similar machine using the HVSS suspension. Also built and used in British Columbia was the Madill 071 minitower yarder. This was a Sherman undercarriage, either original or a new mild steel copy, with a 45 ft tower and 3 working cable drums mounted on top built for cable logging.

A Canadian company, Morpac Industries, Inc., produced heavy-duty, off-road load carriers based on Sherman components up until the late 2010s. These vehicles were used in the construction of electricity transmission lines in remote areas.

In 1947 Vickers produced the Shervick which was a Sherman chassis converted into a heavy tractor. It was designed for clearing land for peanut farming in Tanganyika.

== Service history ==
=== Canada ===
Canada left all its wartime Shermans in Europe, giving them to the Dutch and Belgian armies. In 1946, Canada purchased 300 M4A2 76mm (W) HVSS Shermans. Lord Strathcona's Horse (Royal Canadians) operated a squadron of US-loaned M4A3(76)W HVSS in the Korean War. The Shermans were replaced in the Regular Force with the Centurion in the late 1950s, and remained in use in reserve armoured regiments until 1970.

Canada used Grizzly/Skink Kangaroo APC variants into the 1950s and beginning in 1954 transferred at least 40 to Portugal, some of which were found in a Portuguese scrapyard in 1995. When Canada's post–World War II M4A2(76)W HVSS Shermans were obsolete, it also converted some to Kangaroos and used them into the 1960s until replacement by M113s. A proposed purpose-built Canadian armored vehicle, the Bobcat, never materialized.

=== Europe ===
==== Greece ====
Greece was believed never to have used the Sherman tank, although several British Shermans were in action in Athens during the Communist insurrection of 1944, in support of government forces. During the Greek Civil War, which followed, in the generally mountainous terrain where fighting invariably took place, like at the battle of Mount Grammos in 1949, the favoured tank was the lighter British Centaur, or "Kentavros" in Greek, a variation of the Cromwell tank, a few of which were made available earlier to the National Army. However, at least until 1985 two Sherman turrets, probably M4A2, single-hatch version, minus the guns and set on concrete bases as improvised bunkers, could be seen in the Greek Army's School for Army Engineers at Loutraki, their presence at odds with the commonly accepted view that the Greek Army used only recovery vehicles based on the Sherman and not gun tanks. Recently digitized footage indicates the use of at least one Sherman Tankdozer, probably a M4A4, by the Hellenic Army seen during a visit to Greece by General Eisenhower (see links section below).

==== Italy ====
Italy joined NATO in 1948 and received M4, M4A1 and M4A4 equipped mainly with 75 mm M3, 105 mm M4 and 17 pdr guns, adopting the British designation with Roman numerals and letters. The limited number of tanks in the other variants saw the original engine replaced with the air-cooled Continental of the M4 and M4A1; in subsequent years the Chrysler equipped tanks (M4A4) were also converted to Continental engines. Each tank battalion was initially equipped with 6 Sherman Fireflies, 11 Shermans with 75 mm guns and 6 Shermans with 105 mm howitzers; subsequently, in 1951, the battalion was reformed and numbered 14 Fireflys, 28 Shermans with the standard M3 cannon and 8 with the 105 mm howitzer. They were later joined by some M4A1(76)s and finally replaced with M26 Pershing and M47 Patton starting in 1951–1952.

==== France ====
France used numerous Shermans until the early 1950s. The French Army used Sherman tanks in the First Indochina War in the Régiment blindé colonial d'Extrême-Orient (RBCEO). It was also used by the French Forces in Germany and during the Algerian War. When more modern tanks were introduced into the French Army, the Shermans were partly taken over by the Gendarmerie who employed them in Paris during the putsch of 1961.

==== Yugoslavia ====
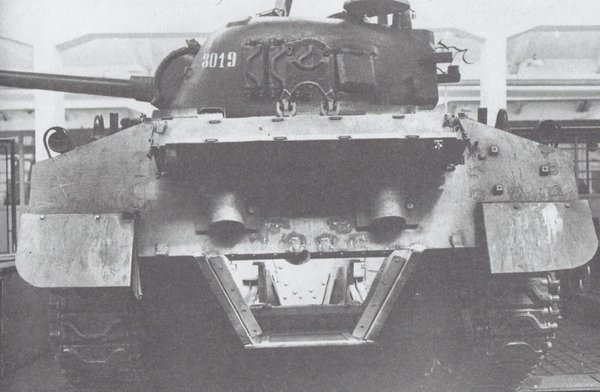
A Yugoslav M-634 powered by a V-2 engine the same used by the T-34.

When Yugoslavian leader Tito withdrew from and opposed the USSR's influence shortly after the Cold War began from the late 1940s, Yugoslavia received as military aid American tanks and military vehicles, including M4A3E4 tanks that were later retrofitted with the M1A1 76 mm tank gun and designated M-634. Other versions of the M-634 used the M3 76mm tank gun. Both M-634 variants were equipped with two M1919A4 7.62mm machine guns as a secondary armament.

==== Other regional nations ====
Denmark and Portugal used M4A3E4 Shermans provided by the US, which were armed with the US 76 mm M1 tank gun. Both Belgium and the Netherlands used M4A1 and M4A2 Shermans (Sherman IIs and IIIs respectively) and former British-made Firefly tanks until during the late 1950s, with the howitzer-equipped version of the Sherman remaining under military service for much longer (at least with the Netherlands), with the Dutch Marine Corps finally phasing all of them out by the beginning of the 1970s.

=== Asia ===
==== China ====
Starting from 1946, a significant number of US-supplied Shermans (together with American M3/M5 Stuart light tanks, received under the Lend-Lease program of WWII, as well) saw combat action with Nationalist Chinese (Kuomintang) forces against communist Chinese troops, especially during the Huaihai Campaign of the Chinese Civil War. A few Nationalist Shermans ended up being captured by communist forces as the former retreated and were forced off the mainland. After the Republic of China relocated to Taiwan in 1949, the United States supplied both M4 and M4A1 Shermans to the Nationalist Chinese military.

==== India and Pakistan ====
The British Indian Army possessed a sizeable number of ex- Shermans at the time of its partition in 1947 and the M4 found itself in both Indian and Pakistani military inventories. During the 1950s, another 200 Shermans were bought by Pakistan from the US. During the 1960s, India operated both M4A3 and M4A4 Shermans equipped with 75 mm main guns and some Shermans displayed as war memorials and military monuments across India still mount the French CN 75-50 75 mm tank gun (the same used on the French AMX-13 light tank). India also upgunned some of its Shermans with Soviet D-56T 76.2mm tank guns that were also carried by Indian PT-76 amphibious light tanks bought from the Soviet Union. During the Indo-Pakistani War of 1965, the Indian Army sent their Shermans to fight alongside and support their smaller fleet of Centurion main battle tanks (MBTs), with little doubt, the most capable and powerful tank India could field against modern Pakistani armour (such as the American M47 Patton) during the various tank battles of the war, such as at the Battle of Asal Uttar (a major armoured clash in that conflict) and were to remain in frontline combat service with the Indian Army until 1971. A number of similar Sexton self-propelled guns (SPGs) were also in Indian military service until around the 1980s.

Pakistani M4A1E6 Sherman on display at Ayub Park.

Pakistan also received 162 ex-British Shermans in 1947, most of which had the US 76 mm tank gun fitted on. At independence, the Pakistan Armoured Corps had two variants of the Sherman – the Mark III powered by the GMC marine diesel engine, and the Mark V powered by the A57 Chrysler multibank. Pakistan also bought 547 M4A1E4(76)s from the USA (one of its major allies since the end of the 1940s) during the 1950s. Around 300 of Pakistan's M4s saw their fair share of combat against various types of Indian armour (ranging from the then-already-obsolete American M3 Stuart light tank, also including same or similar Shermans in Indian military service as well, to the modern British Centurion MBT) in the Indo-Pakistani War of 1965 and the second one in 1971. After 1971, the Pakistani Army retired their M4s from active military service. At the time of the Indo-Pakistani War of 1965, Pakistan owned 200 Shermans which were armed with 76 mm main guns. The Sherman fought on both Indian and Pakistani sides in the Second Kashmir War (otherwise known more widely as the Indo-Pakistani War of 1965) as well as the Indo-Pakistani War of 1971. Some of the surviving Shermans from both wars between the two South Asian nations are on display all across both countries, in India as well as in Pakistan, with the latter having at least one of its Shermans displayed at the Pakistan Army Museum.

==== Iran ====
Iran received an unknown number of 76 mm gun-armed Shermans (those fitted with the HVSS-type suspension system) from the USA (one of its most important allies during the Cold War until 1979) during the 1950s and at least some were used in combat starting from 1980, when it saw military action against much-more modern Iraqi tanks, such as the Soviet T-55 MBT, during the Iran–Iraq War which began in that same year. The Sherman fared badly in battle against the advanced types of armour (primarily Soviet) fielded by the Iraqi Army and, consequently, many Iranian Shermans were lost, which enabled Iraq to capture a sizeable quantity during the conflict (some of these former Iranian Shermans were even chanced upon and discovered by US troops and Coalition forces when they jointly invaded Iraq in 2003). While it is unknown as to how and when, Iraq also managed to possess at least a single M-50 Sherman (supposedly an Israeli Army tank and a captured one) and has it put on display in the city of Tikrit.

==== Japan ====
The Japan Self-Defense Forces (JSDF) received 250 M4A3(76)W HVSS "Easy Eight" Shermans and 80 of the related M32 TRV in 1954. The locally developed and indigenous Type 61 tank only gradually and slowly replaced American-supplied tanks over the decade of the 1960s. Aside from Japan, the Philippine Army was also another Asian operator of the M4 Sherman following WWII, as was the militaries of both Indonesia and South Vietnam.

==== Philippines ====
The Philippine Army received 36 M4A1 composite-hull Shermans. Philippine contingent to the United Nations Command (UNC) in the Korean War Campaign The Philippines deployed 16 M4A1 Sherman tanks and one M18 Hellcat tank destroyer. This small armored force augmented the other Allied armor during the early days of the Korean conflict. The small Filipino armored force was brought in by then-2LT Francisco S. Tamondong, along with two noncommissioned officers, in July 1950.

==== South Korea ====
The Republic of Korea Armed Forces received 388 M4A3E8 HVSS Shermans from the US during and after the Korean War. During the war, they were primarily used by the ROK Marine Corps for training armored units. In combat, they provided direct fire support against enemy infantry alongside M36 Jackson tank destroyers of the ROK Army. They were used by both the Army and the Marines into the late 50s and early 60s, before being replaced by the M47 and M48 Patton series tanks.

=== Middle East ===
==== Israel ====
The Israel Defense Forces used American M4 Shermans as early as in the 1948 war. Israel obtained her first Shermans through stealing them, buying them in the Philippines or getting demilitarized ones from scrapyards around Europe. The first one, nicknamed Meir, was obtained in May 1948; the British Army intended it for destruction, but soldiers handed it over to Hagana instead, that fitted it with a 75 mm gun. One more was found at scrapyard in Israel and armed initially with an externally mounted 20 mm gun (the tank was named "Tamar") and later a 75 mm gun. Other similar covertly acquired ex-British Sherman tanks were named "Ada" and "Ruth II". In November 1948 35 more were purchased from Italian scrapyards. All these were non-operational, only 4 were completely repaired until the end of the war and 14 by November (some necessitated re-arming with the Krupp 75 mm field gun). By late 1953 Israel had 76 operational Shermans and 131 nonoperational.

By 1956, Israel had at least 200 Sherman tanks, including 60 Shermans provided by France, and the Sherman became the standard tank in the Israeli armored units. In March 1956, Israel began to upgrade Shermans with French CN 75-50 75 mm guns to create the Sherman M-50. The first 25 M-50s were finished just in time for the October 1956 Operation Kadesh in the Sinai against the Egyptian Army. The first 50 M-50 tanks had the Continental R-975 gasoline engine and VVSS suspension, the rest had a Cummins diesel engine and HVSS suspension. During the Sinai Campaign Israel captured M4A3 tanks from Egyptians.

After 1956 France sold to Israel its Sherman surplus. In the 1960s, 180 M4A1(76) Sherman tanks began conversion to the diesel-powered Sherman M-51 standard with HVSS and French CN 105 F1 105 mm gun to counter T-54/55 tanks bought by Arab countries. Both M-50s and M-51s saw combat in the Six-Day War and M-50s were also employed in the 1973 Yom Kippur War. All M-50s with Continental engines were retired by 1972.

M-50s with the Cummins engine and M-51s were gradually phased out in the late 1970s to early 1980s. In total, about 620 Sherman tanks were purchased by Israel in 1948–1967, many being converted to local version (howitzer, mortars, etc.).

==== Egypt ====
Egypt purchased Shermans from Britain prior to the Arab-Israeli War of 1948 (the first major clash between the newly established state of Israel and its neighbouring Arab states (particularly Egypt) which were extremely hostile to it) and used at least 3 in that conflict against Israel. Egypt purchased more M4A2s (Sherman IIIs) and M4A4s (Sherman Vs) from the UK after 1948 but soon switched to purchasing and operating Soviet tanks and armoured fighting vehicles (AFVs), such as the T-34/85 and the SU-100. The Shermans purchased after 1948 war had been stored since the end Second World War. The Egyptians re-built their Shermans, same as the Israelis did, but had much less success.

The Egyptian military used Sherman tanks against Israel, which was supported by the UK and France, in the Suez Crisis war of 1956, losing about 40 tanks, either destroyed or captured by Israel. Before 1956 Egypt had fitted some of their Shermans with the FL-10 tank turret of the French AMX-13 light tank and changed the diesel engines of their M4A4s with those from their M4A2s. By 1967, surviving Shermans were deemed outdated by the Egyptian military, so Egypt handed over the remaining 30 left to the 20th Palestinian Division based in the Gaza Strip, thus forming their one and only tank battalion. Eventually, at least half of the division's tanks would be captured or destroyed by Israel during the Six-Day War.

==== Syria ====
Syria possessed at least one turretless M4A1 tank (possibly converted into an armoured personnel carrier) at some point between 1948 and 1956.

=== Africa ===
Uganda acquired a number of ex-Israeli M4A1(76)W tanks (comprising both VVSS-type and HVSS-type Shermans) and at least some of these were fitted with smoke-dischargers and operated them during the early part of the era of the dictatorial regime of Idi Amin (around the time when he was still friendly to Israel and enjoyed Israeli backing and support).

=== Americas ===
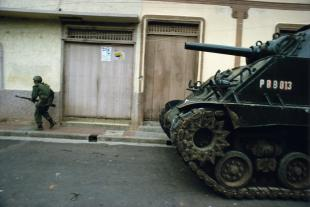
An M4A3(105) HVSS Sherman of the Nicaraguan National Guard engaging in firefights (providing fire-support) with the Sandinista National Liberation Front during clashes between the US-backed government forces and rebels in Estelí, Nicaragua, in 1979.

Many countries in Latin America (a large number of which were closely aligned with or allied with the U.S. throughout much of the era of the Cold War) operated the Sherman for a long period of time following World War II.

==== North and Central America ====
===== Cuba =====
Cuba purchased at least seven Sherman tanks from the U.S. (the variants are unknown but what is clear is that they were very likely equipped with newer HVSS-type suspension systems and armed with a 76mm main gun) to field in the fighting against the left-wing nationalist guerrillas and rebels under Fidel Castro. Some of these tanks saw combat action against Castro's fighters during the Battle of Santa Clara and at least one was captured by the victorious rebels after the government military forces were defeated. The captured Shermans used by the rebels were displayed on parade when they triumphantly entered Havana while riding on them. While it still remains unclear, it is believed that there was possibly one Sherman used by the defending Cuban Army against the U.S.-sponsored invasion of Castro's Cuba (carried out by anti-communist Cuban exiles backed by the American CIA) at the Bay of Pigs (Playa Girón). Most of the tanks and armoured fighting vehicles (AFVs) the Cuban Army used at the battle were Soviet, such as the T-34/85 and the SU-100.

===== Nicaragua =====
In Central America, Nicaragua operated four M4A3 Sherman tanks (mainly HVSS-type Shermans). It was in Nicaragua where the Sherman most likely saw action in combat for the last time, during the civil war raging in the country at the end of the 1970s. During the Sandinista Revolution between 1978 and 1979, the Nicaraguan National Guard made use of their Sherman tanks in pitched urban warfare against the fighting rebels and the insurrection. Shortly after the Sandinistas took over political power and seized control of the whole country, the new (reformed) Nicaraguan Army received more modern Soviet-made tanks (such as the T-55 MBT) and the older Shermans soon disappeared and vanished from the country's military scene (they were most likely scrapped).

Mexico

Mexico only possesses 3 armoured recovery vehicle (ARV) variants of the Sherman (no gun tanks) and in 1998 upgraded them to become the M32 Chenca TRV (Tank Recovery Vehicle).

==== South America ====
The Chilean Army acquired ex-Israeli Shermans for conversion to become their M-60 Sherman variant, fitted with a 60 mm Hyper Velocity Medium Support (HVMS) tank gun, which were used until at least 1989 (possibly even much later, probably until 1999), when they were replaced by French AMX-30 and German Leopard 1 main battle tanks (MBTs).

Paraguay had 10 Shermans in active-duty military service as of 2016, which were predominantly used for operational training and support, in addition to another 5 that are kept in storage and were usually deployed for parades. These Shermans were retired from service in April 2018.

== Chronological list of wars/conflicts the Sherman tank was involved in ==
- 1939–1945: World War II (saw action between 1942 and 1945)
- 1927–1949: Chinese Civil War (saw action between 1946 and 1949, following WWII)
- 1945–1949: Indonesian National Revolution
- 1946–1954: First Indochina War
- 1948: First Arab-Israeli War
- 1946–1949: Greek Civil War
- 1950–1953: Korean War
- 1956: Suez Crisis
- 1958: Lebanon Crisis
- 1953–1959: Cuban Revolution
- 1961: Bay of Pigs invasion
- 1963: 1963 Argentine Navy revolt
- 1965: Indo-Pakistani War of 1965
- 1967: Six-Day War
- 1971: Indo-Pakistani War of 1971
- 1973: Yom Kippur War
- 1978–1979: Tanzanian-Ugandan War
- 1978–1979: Nicaraguan Revolution
- 1975–1990: Lebanese Civil War
- 1980–1988: Iran-Iraq War
- 1991–1999 (lasted until as late as 2001): Yugoslav Wars

== Surviving examples ==
=== Argentina ===
- Sherman Ic – Comando del III Cuerpo de Ejercito. Camino a La Calera Cordoba

=== Brazil ===
- M4(75) Sherman – 9º Regimento de Cavalaria Blindado, São Gabriel Serial Number 25630. It was received by 1º Regimento de Carros de Combate on 23 Oct 1945. It was operated by 3rd Coy/1º BCC until 1972. After that, it was sent to 9º Regimento de Cavalaria Blindado (9º RCB).

=== Finland ===
- M4 Sherman – Finnish Armour Museum, Parola Serial Number 15446 built by Baldwin LW in May, 1943. This tank has been given to the museum by Germany in 1989

=== Israel ===
- M4E8 Sherman – Yad la-Shiryon Museum, Latrun

=== Lebanon ===
- Sherman Vc – In front of Tyre barracks, Tyre

=== Netherlands ===
- M4 Sherman – Netherlands War Museum, Overloon Serial Number 15499.

=== Philippines ===
- M4 Composite Sherman – Former Philippine Army M4 Composite tank in Philippine Expeditionary Forces to Korea Colors is on Public Display at the Philippine Military Academy, Baguio City, Benguet, Philippines.
- M4A2 Sherman was abandoned at Malico Viewpoint, Stafe Nueva Vizcaya, Philippines by the Philippine Army after an engine fire deemed it unrecoverable due to difficult terrain. It has since been turned into a tourist attraction, but falsely labelled as a US Army tank.

=== Turkey ===
- M4E9 Sherman – Etimesgut Tank Müzesi, Ankara

=== South Africa ===
- Sherman Ic – Wonderboom Military Museum, Waterval, near WallmansthalNorth of Pretoria

=== Sweden ===
- Sherman Vc – Arsenalen Tank Museum, Strängnäs (Sweden) Sweden bought 4 Sherman tanks after WW2, 2 M4A4, one M4A2 and one M4 105. The one displayed here was used in the development of the "S" tank

== See also ==
- M50 Super Sherman
- M4 Sherman
- Lend-Lease Sherman tanks
- Israel Defense Forces (IDF)
- Japan Self Defense Forces (JSDF)
- Republic of Korea Armed Forces (ROK Armed Forces)
