= M66 =

M66 may refer to:

- M66 (New York City bus), a New York City Bus route in Manhattan
- M-66 (Michigan highway), a state highway in Michigan
- M66 motorway, a motorway in Greater Manchester, England
- Black Magic M66, the classification of a fictional android
- Messier 66, a spiral galaxy in the constellation Leo
- Mission 66, a program in the National Park Service
- Soltam M-66, a 160 mm mortar manufactured in Israel
- Smith & Wesson Model 66 (S&W M66), a variant of Smith & Wesson Model 19 (S&W M19) revolver
