= SA 49 =

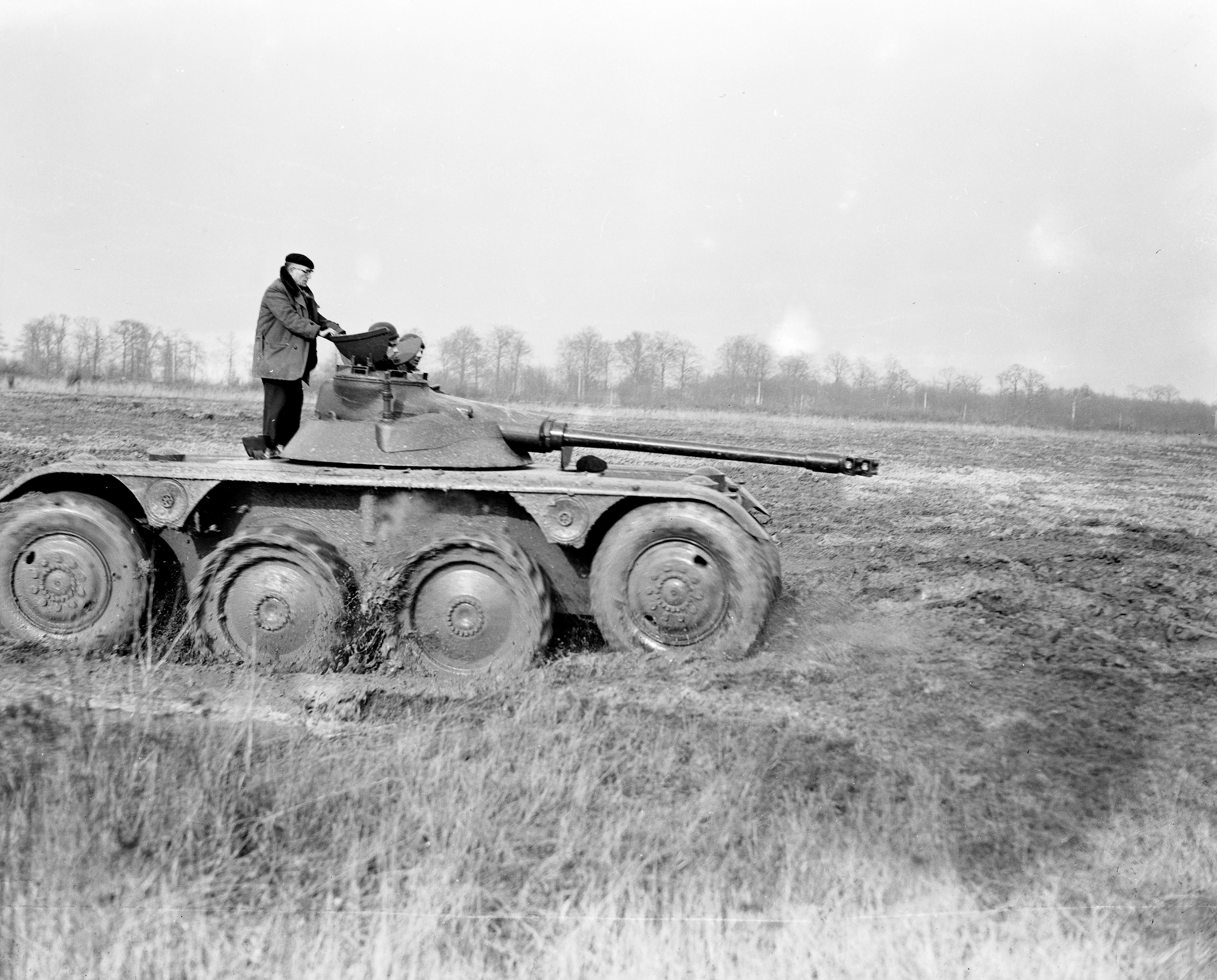
- An EBR model 1951 armed with the 75 mm SA 49 gun.
- Type: Rifled tank gun
- Place of origin: France

Service history
- In service: 1951–1964
- Used by: French Army
- Wars: Algerian War

Production history
- Designer: Atelier de Construction de Puteaux (APX)
- Designed: 1950
- Manufacturer: Atelier de Construction de Puteaux (APX)
- Produced: 1951–1953
- No. built: 800
- Variants: CN 90 F2 (D 924)

Specifications
- Mass: 448 kg (988 lb)
- Length: 2.583 m (8 ft 5.7 in)
- Barrel length: 34 calibres
- Shell: 75×350mm R
- Shell weight: 6.8 kg (15 lb) (AP Shot M61)
- Calibre: 75 mm (2.95 in)
- Action: semi-automatic vertical sliding-wedge breech
- Breech: vertical sliding-wedge
- Recoil: 300 mm (12 in)
- Elevation: -10° to +15°
- Traverse: 360°
- Rate of fire: up to 14 rounds per minute
- Muzzle velocity: 598 to 625 m/s (1,960 to 2,050 ft/s) (depending on the rounds)
- Maximum firing range: 3,000 m (3,300 yd)
- Sights: APX L 52

The 75 SA 49 (French: 75 mm Semi-Automatique Modèle 1949; 75 mm Semi-Automatic 1949 Model) is a French 75 mm low-recoil rifled gun specially designed to be mounted on the EBR eight-wheeled armored reconnaissance vehicle.

== History ==
The SA 49 was made with the idea of re-using the stockpiled 75x350mm R ammunition previously used by the French 75 mm Mle 97 gun and the US 75 mm M3 and M6 guns (already used by the French Army) while featuring the same external ballistics as the latter. The development effort has been then concentrated on reducing of the recoil force and its integration in the FL 11 oscillating turret.

In development as early as 1945, the French army requested a 75mm gun who was capable of 100 mm (3.9 in) of penetration against tank at a distance of 1,000 m (1,100 yd) and capable to use the WW2 ammunition. initially named in his early development the Cannon de 75 75/600, (named based on the caliber 75 mm (3.0 in) and velocity of 600 m/s (2,000 ft/s)) unable to achieve this result at such distance, for a time, different type of ammunition was studied such as Armour Piercing discard sabot (APDS) and HEAT rounds such as those used by WW2 German tank. but the early studies proved this result impossible to achieve with this gun. for a time the gun adoption was unsure but with unimpressive result of the 105mm D.1056 was to be used on the fire-support turret was intended to be used on both EBR and AMX-13, the 75mm 75/600 proven to be a perfect alternative to be used as fire-support for the French Colony where the tank battle was not a reality in 1950. in 1950 the 75mm 75/600 was adopted as the 75 mm Semi-Automatique Modèle 1949 or 75 SA 49. this gun served as the main armament for colonial vehicles such as the EBR and AMX 13 due to the capacity to use high explosive rounds at a lower velocity which allows it to reach targets hidden behind obstacles as well as be capable to engage lightly armored vehicles.

=== Second life ===
In the early 1960s, the decision was taken to rebore the SA 49 to the internal dimensions of the D 921A 90 mm low-pressure rifled gun (CN 90 F1) of the AML-90, allowing the retroffited EBR to also use the powerful OCC 90 EMP Mle 61 fin-stabilized HEAT shell fired at a muzzle velocity of 750 m/s (2,500 ft/s). A single baffle muzzle brake replaced the original double baffle muzzle brake.

The re-bored 75 SA 49 took the factory designation of D 924 and was later known as CN 90 F2 (French: Canon de 90 millimètres modèle F2; 90 millimeters gun F2 Model). After a preliminary study carried out in 1963, 650 FL 11 turrets were transformed between 1964 and 1968.

== Ammunition ==
- PCOT 40 : a 6.41 kg APCBC-T with a muzzle velocity of 625 m/s.
- OE 49 : a 6.3 kg high explosive shell with a muzzle velocity of 598 m/s
- M61 APC-T : US-made APCBC-T round
- M61A1 APC-T : US-made APCBC-HE-T filled with 15 g of explosive D.
- M48 HE : US-made high explosive shell.

== Additional specifications ==
- Total length: 2.943 m
- Rifling length: 2.583 m (L/34)
- Rifling twist: 7°, right twist
- Number of grooves: 24
- Muzzle brake: double baffle
- Recoil mechanism: two hydropneumatic retarders
- Recuperator: single spring
- Maximum recoil length: 320 mm
- Recoiling gun mass: 320 kg
- Barrel weight: 194 kg
- Priming: electrical or manual

== See also ==
- SA 50 – Parallel development of this gun, used for the anti-tank role

=== Weapons of comparable role, performance, and era ===
- Soviet D-56T
- American M6
