= Super Sherman =

Sherman M-50
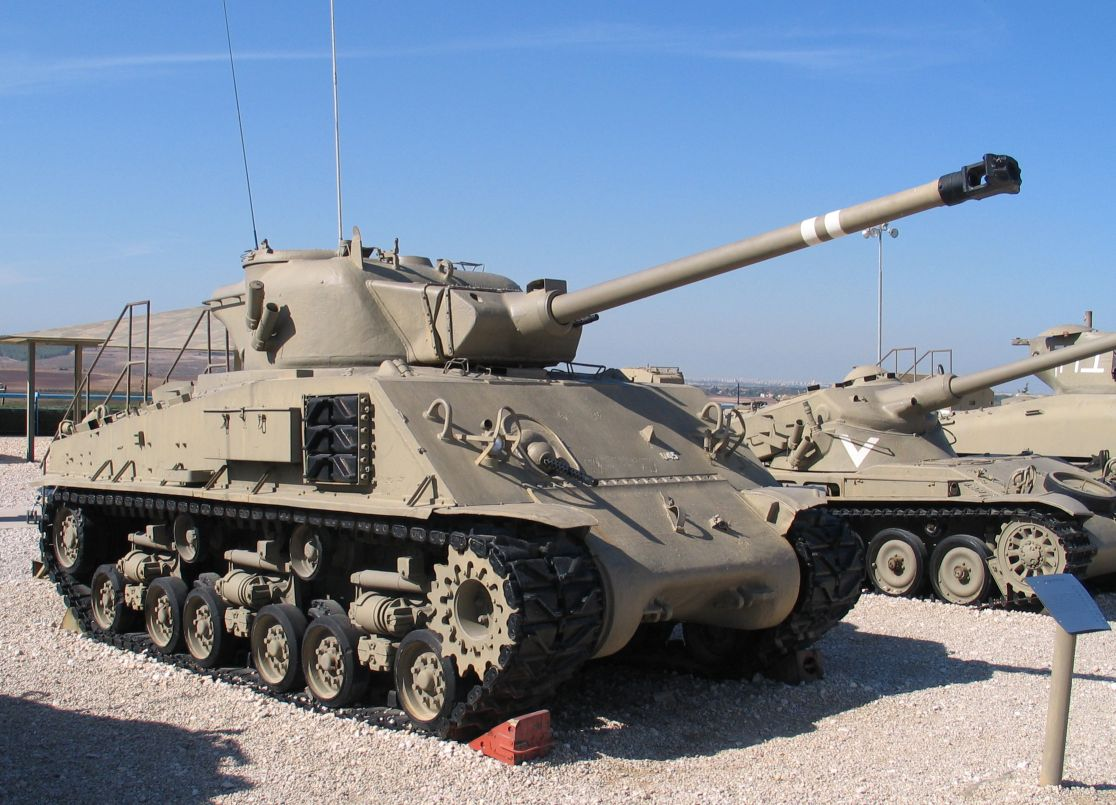
- M-50 Super Sherman at Yad La-Shiryon, Israel.
- Type: Medium tank
- Place of origin: Israel

Service history
- Used by: See Operators
- Wars: Suez Crisis; The War Over Water; Six-Day War; Yom Kippur War; Lebanese Civil War; 1982 Lebanon War

Production history
- Designed: 1954–1955
- Produced: 1956–1962
- No. built: ~300

Specifications
- Mass: 38 t (37 long tons)
- Length: 6.15 m (20.2 ft)
- Width: 2.85 m (9.4 ft)
- Height: 3.04 m (10.0 ft)
- Crew: 5 (commander, driver, gunner, loader, assistant driver/bow gunner)
- Main armament: 75 mm CN-75-50 L/61.5
- Secondary armament: 1× 12.7 mm M2 Browning; 2× 7.62 mm M1919 Browning machine gun
- Engine: M-50 Degem Alef; Continental R-975-C4 gasoline; 420 hp (310 kW); M-50 Degem Bet; Cummins VT-8-460 diesel; 460 hp (340 kW)
- Suspension: VVSS or HVSS
- Fuel capacity: 606 liters
- Operational range: 300 km (190 mi)
- Maximum speed: 38–42 km/h (24–26 mph)

Sherman M-51
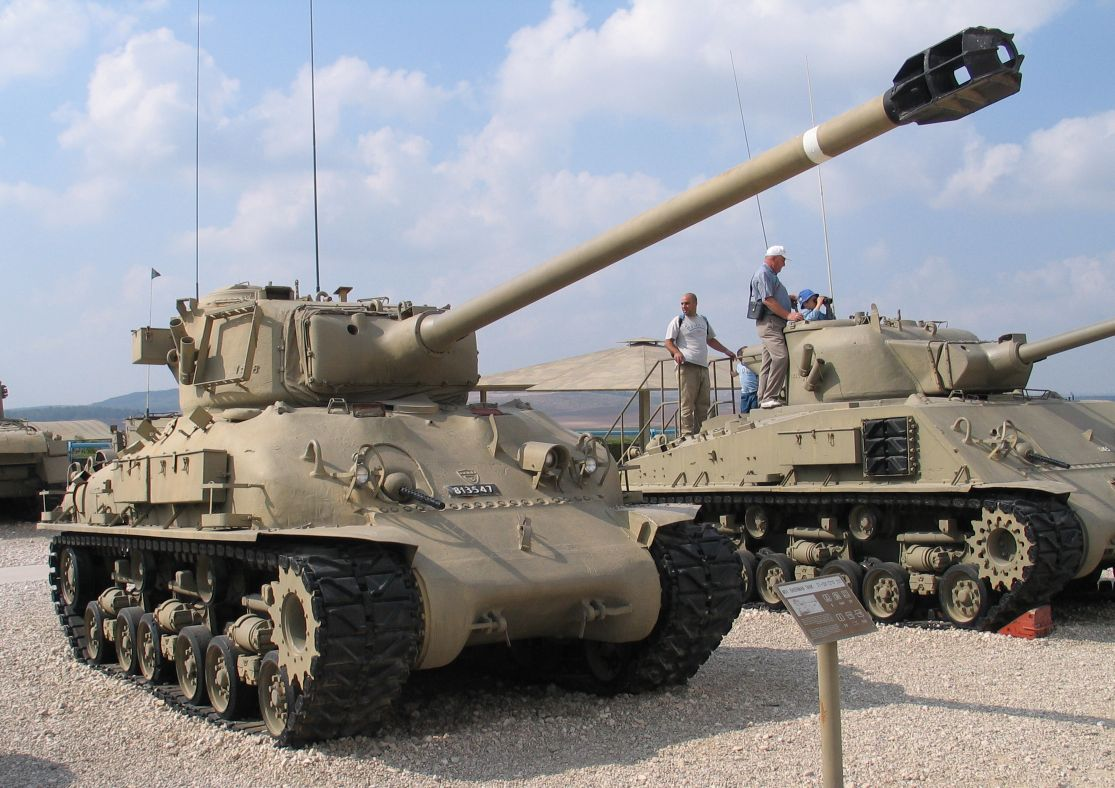
- M-51 Super Sherman at Yad La-Shiryon, Israel.
- Type: Medium tank
- Place of origin: Israel

Service history
- Used by: See Operators
- Wars: Six-Day War; Yom Kippur War

Production history
- Produced: 1961–1965
- No. built: 180

Specifications
- Mass: 40 t (39 long tons)
- Length: 6.15 m (20.2 ft)
- Width: 2.42 m (7.9 ft)
- Height: 2.24 m (7.3 ft)
- Crew: 5 (commander, driver, gunner, loader, assistant driver/bow gunner)
- Main armament: 105 mm D1508 L/51
- Secondary armament: 1× 12.7 mm M2 Browning; 2× 7.62 mm M1919 Browning machine gun
- Engine: Cummins VT-8-460 diesel; 460 hp (340 kW)
- Suspension: HVSS
- Fuel capacity: 606 liters
- Operational range: 300 km (190 mi)
- Maximum speed: 40 km/h (25 mph)

The Sherman M-50 and the Sherman M-51, both often incorrectly referred to abroad as the Super Sherman, were modified versions of the American M4 Sherman tank that served with the Israel Defense Forces from the mid-1950s to early 1980s. The M-51 was also referred to as the Isherman (i.e. Israeli Sherman). However, the nickname "Super Sherman" only applies to Israeli Shermans with a 76 mm gun, and not the M-50 or M-51. The nickname "Isherman" were never officially used by the Israeli Defense Forces.

== History ==
In 1953, an Israeli military delegation visited France to examine the then-new AMX-13/75 light tank, which was armed with the high-velocity CN 75-50 75 mm tank gun. While the tank's main gun was considered satisfactory, its armor was deemed to be too light. Eventually, Israel did purchase the AMX-13, but, in a similar parallel development, it was decided that the 75mm main guns of the AMX-13s Israel bought would be grafted to the more-familiar and the better-armored hull of the American M4 Sherman medium tank, which was the standard tank of the IDF's armored units (a large quantity of post-WWII Sherman tanks ended up in Israeli military service from 1948 onwards) during the period of the early 1950s.

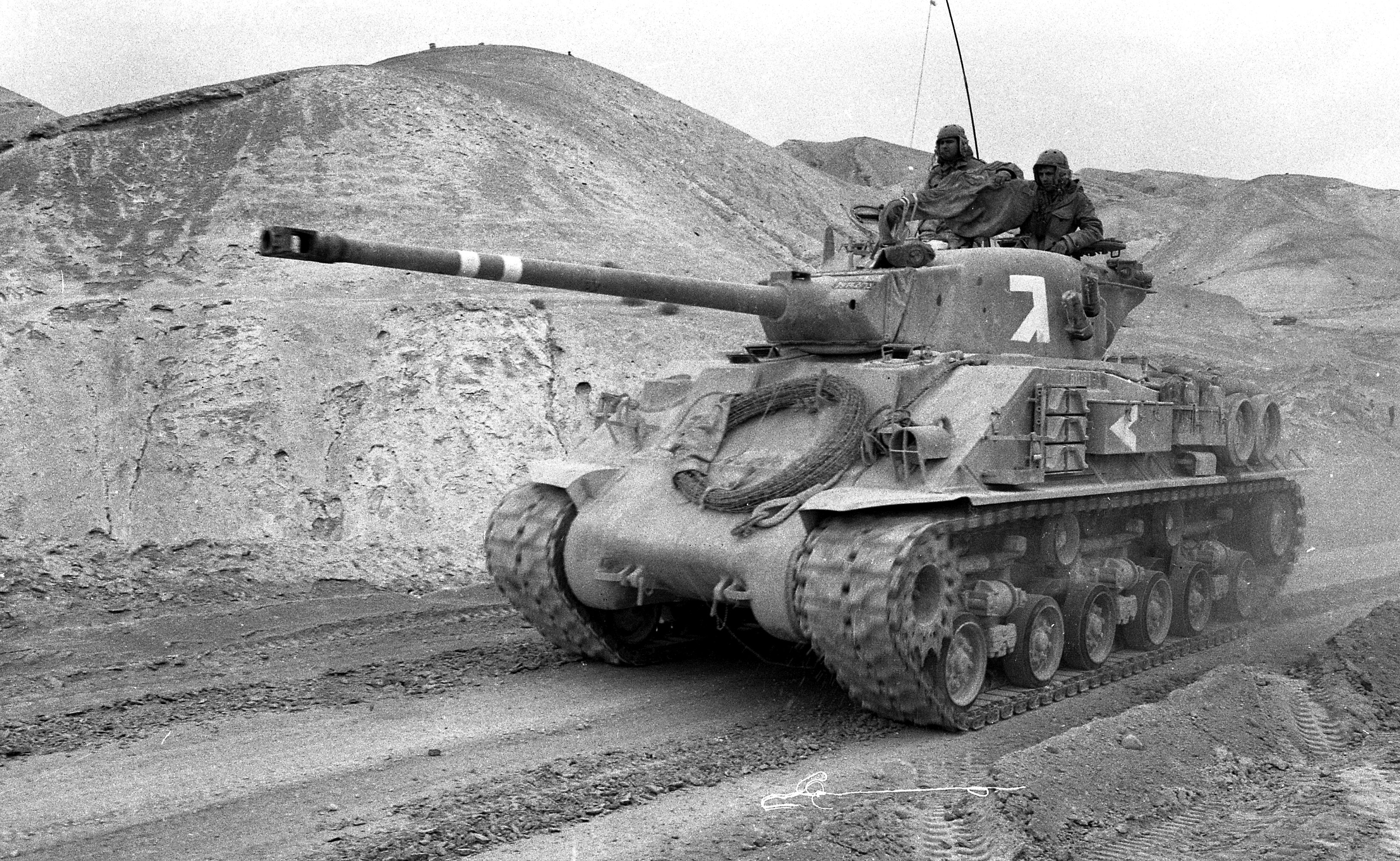
Sherman M-50 in 1970

This project started in 1954 and in 1955, a prototype turret was sent from France to Israel. In March 1956, Israeli Ordnance Corps military facilities began to convert (up-gun) their Sherman tanks with 75mm tank guns of AMX-13s bought and received from France. The 75mm tank gun was known in Israel as the M-50 and, as a result, the up-gunned Sherman was designated as the Sherman M-50. The M-50 was similar to the WWII-era British Sherman Firefly tank in that it possessed the original smaller type of Sherman tank turret (as used by US Shermans which carry the original 75mm M3 tank gun) which was fitted with a large counterweight at the turret's rear end to balance the weight of a longer and heavier tank gun.

The first 50 units were based on M4A4 hulls, had a Continental R-975 gasoline engine and VVSS suspension. However, the increased weight of the vehicle combined with narrow tracks led to poor off-road mobility. It was also putting too much strain on the engine, resulting in frequent mechanical failures. Consequently, for the rest of the conversions, hulls fitted with HVSS suspension and Cummins V-8 460 horsepower (340 kW) diesel engine were adopted. These subvariants were sometimes referred to as the M-50 Continental and M-50 Cummins, or M-50 Degem Alef and M-50 Degem Bet respectively. Diesel engines were also preferred since diesel fuel is less flammable than gasoline, which factors into battlefield survivability. In total, about 300 M-50s were built by 1964 (though it's possible that this number includes 120 155 mm self-propelled guns on Sherman chassis, also designated M-50).

This same gun was also fitted to a number of M10 tank destroyers.

In the 1960s, 180 Sherman tanks received a shortened version of the even more powerful French 105 mm Modèle F1 gun. The barrel length of the gun was reduced from 56 caliber to 51 and it was equipped with a unique double-baffle muzzle brake; ammunition was altered to use a smaller cartridge. In Israel the gun was designated M-51 and the tank the Sherman M-51. M4A1 hulls and the larger T23 turrets (from 76 mm armed Shermans) were used for the conversion. All tanks were fitted with Cummins diesel engines and HVSS suspension. The tank was displayed to the public for the first time during the Independence Day ceremony in 1965.

Abroad the M-50 was known as Super Sherman (the "Continental" variant as Mark I and the "Cummins" variant as Mark II) and the M-51 as either Super Sherman, Isherman (i.e. Israeli Sherman) or M4A1 Revalorise. These designations were never used in Israel. The only tank model designated Super Sherman by the IDF was the M4A1 with 76 mm M1 gun and HVSS suspension, which was named Super Sherman M-1.

== Service history ==
The first 25 M-50s were finished just in time for Operation Kadesh – the Israeli 29 October 1956 invasion of the Sinai – against the Egyptian Army (which also employed its own up-gunned version of the M4 Sherman, fitted with the French AMX-13 turret, making it equal to the M-50 in firepower).

In 1964, Israel neared completion of its National Water Carrier to divert water from the Sea of Galilee as allocated in the multinational 1955 Unified (Johnston) Plan. The Arab nations were in uproar, and Syria began a project to divert water into Jordan (the Headwater Diversion Plan). Maj General Israel Tal had trained Israeli tank gunners to shoot beyond 1,500 metres (1,600 yd) and, on March 6, 1965, an M-50, commanded by Tal, engaged a Syrian recoilless rifle that had killed an Israeli tractor driver; Tal personally destroyed the recoilless rifle at long range. A few days later, General Tal, with an M-50 and a Centurion Mk III tank, was waiting for a chance to fire upon the Syrian water diverting project. When Syrian gunners fired on a border patrol, Tal's M-50 and the Centurion fired on eight tractors 2,000 metres (2,200 yd) away, and destroyed them all in two minutes with 10 shots – Tal destroyed 5 tractors with his M-50's 75 mm gun, and the Centurion destroyed the remainder.

Both the M-50 and M-51 saw combat in the Six-Day War that left the Golan Heights, the West Bank, and the Sinai peninsula in Israeli hands, often fighting against Soviet World War II-era armor like the T-34-85 (for example at the Battle of Abu-Ageila). Both were also employed in the 1973 Yom Kippur War alongside and against much more modern tanks. The use of such seemingly obsolete tanks was necessary given the desperate nature of the fighting.

In combat against the Arab armies, the M-51 proved itself capable of fighting newer, heavier tanks like the Soviet-built T-54/55/T-62. The M-51's 105 mm gun could penetrate these adversaries using HEAT ammunition. The M-51 served well during its time, and is regarded as an excellent example of how an obsolete tank (the Sherman) can be upgraded beyond the limits of its original capabilities.

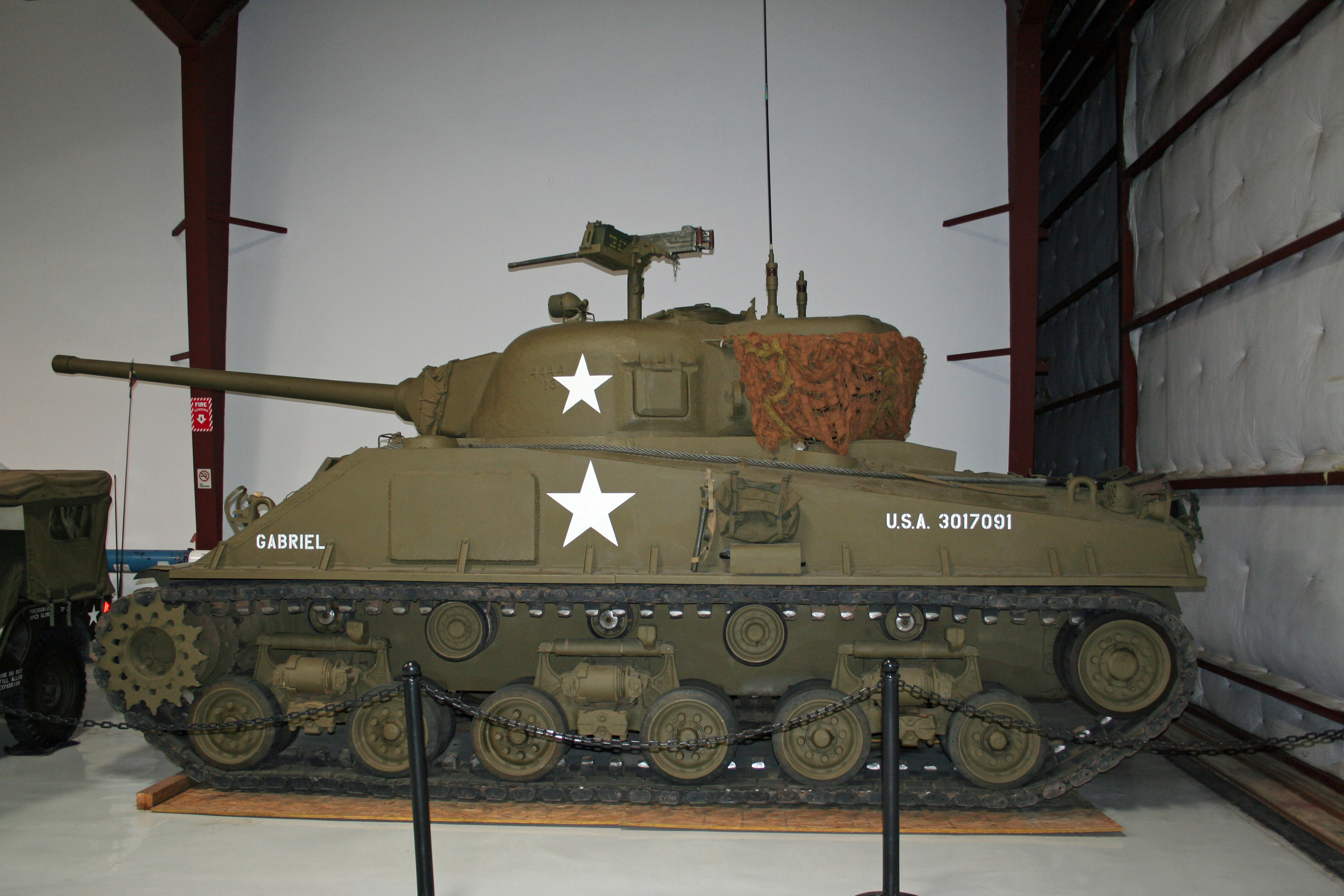
M-50 Super Sherman at the Cavanaugh Flight Museum.

The M-50 Continentals were retired by 1972. The M-50 Cummins and M-51 were gradually phased out in late 1970s to early 1980s. During the Lebanese Civil War, some 75 M-50s were given as aid to the Israeli-supported Lebanese Christian militias – Kataeb Regulatory Forces (19), Tigers Militia (20), Guardians of the Cedars (1), the Lebanese Forces (40), and the South Lebanon Army (35) – in 1976; two tanks were captured from the SLA in March 1978 by the Palestine Liberation Organization (PLO), which employed them in the defense of West Beirut during the June 1982 Israeli invasion of Lebanon.

About 100 of the remaining tanks of this model were sold to Chile in the late 1980s. Some of those were fitted with the IMI-OTO 60 mm Hyper Velocity Medium Support (HVMS) gun, and were often referred to as M-60. This variant was never used by the IDF. Chile used its Shermans until 1999, when they were replaced by the Leopard 1. The few M-51s that Israel retained were converted into engineer vehicles and self-propelled artillery.

== Operators ==
- Chile – ≈50 M-50 upgraded with the 60 mm IMI-OTO HVMS gun, ≈150 M 51
- Israel – M-50, M-51

=== Non-state operators ===
- Lebanese militias – M-50 (Kataeb Regulatory Forces, Lebanese Forces, Tigers Militia, Guardians of the Cedars, South Lebanon Army)
- Palestine Liberation Organization – two captured M-50s in Lebanon

== See also ==
- Post–World War II Sherman tanks
- List of weapons of the Lebanese Civil War
