= Panhard EBR =

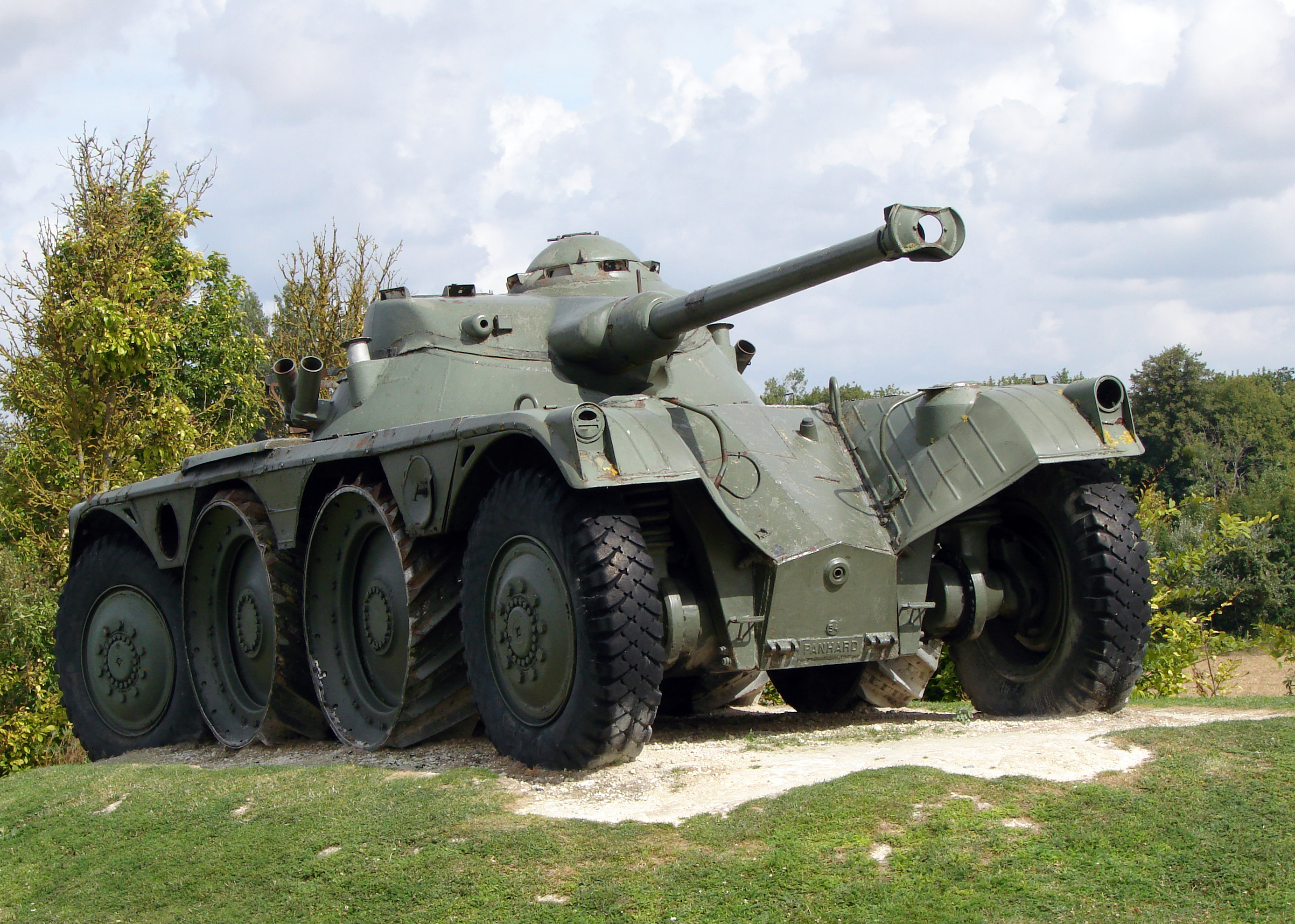
- An EBR Mle 51 re-armed with the 90 mm low-pressure gun displayed at the National Tank Monument in Berry-au-Bac.
- Type: Wheeled reconnaissance vehicle, Armoured car
- Place of origin: France

Service history
- Used by: French Army; Indonesian Army; Portuguese Army
- Wars: Algerian War; Portuguese Colonial War; Indonesia-Malaysia Confrontation; Sand War; Western Sahara War

Production history
- Designer: Panhard
- Manufacturer: Panhard
- Produced: 1951-1960
- No. built: 1179
- Variants: EBR-ETT (APC)

Specifications
- Mass: 12.5 tonnes (13.8 short tons; 12.3 long tons) (model 1951); 14.9 tonnes (16.4 short tons; 14.7 long tons) (model 1954)
- Length: 6.15 m (20 ft 2 in)
- Width: 2.42 m (7 ft 11 in)
- Height: 2.24 m (7 ft 4 in); 2.32 m (7 ft 7 in) (eight wheels deployed)
- Crew: 4; driver, commander, gunner and rear driver
- Armor: Turret front 40 mm (sloped); Turret sides 25 mm Hull front 20 mm (sloped); Hull sides 15 mm
- Main armament: Model 1951 : SA 49 75 mm rifled gun (56 rnds); Model 1951 revalorisé: CN 90 F2 90 mm low-pressure gun (43 rnds); Model 1954: SA 50 75 mm high-velocity rifled gun (36 rnds)
- Secondary armament: 3× 7.5 mm MAC31 Reibel machine guns most common, sometimes 4 x 7.5 mm MGs; 4× DREB smoke dischargers
- Engine: Panhard 12 H 6000 S flat-twelve gasoline engine 200 hp at 3700 RPM
- Power/weight: 15.6 hp/tonne
- Transmission: two 4-speed tandem-mounted gearboxes providing a total of 16 different gear ratios
- Suspension: coil springs and hydropneumatic, 8×8
- Ground clearance: 340 to 420 mm
- Fuel capacity: 370 l
- Operational range: 700 km (430 mi)
- Maximum speed: up to 115 km/h (71 mph); 75 km/h (47 mph) to 85 km/h (53 mph) on secondary roads 10 km/h (6.2 mph) to 25 km/h (16 mph) on rough and uneven terrain
- Steering system: front and rear axle

The Panhard EBR (French: Engin Blindé de Reconnaissance, lit. 'Armored Reconnaissance Vehicle') is an armoured car designed by Panhard for the French Army and later used across the globe, notably by the French Army during the Algerian War and by the Portuguese Army during the Portuguese Colonial War.

== Development history ==
The EBR is an 8x8 wheeled reconnaissance vehicle based on the previous Panhard AM 40 P/Model 201, a light armored car born before the Second World War, but which remained only at prototype level. After the war, the new contest for a postwar armored car saw the Panhard proposal as winner against two other French firms. While the two basic concepts developed with the M.201 were retained (8 wheels and oscillating turret), the new armoured car was a new project, much heavier (13 t vs 8), with a larger crew (4 vs 2) and a 75 mm gun (vs 25 mm). Other innovations included new anti-bullet Michelin tyres and Veil-Picard tubes, which feature a series of nitrogen-filled cells, enabling them to absorb bullet hits and not go flat. The armoured hull is mounted on an 8-wheel drive, with four inner metal wheels, which can be raised for driving on the road. The four central wheels have aluminum rims with steel grousers, separated by rubber blocks; with all eight wheels deployed, ground pressure is only 0.7 kg (1.5 lb) per 1 cm^{2} (0.16 in^{2}).

The EBR had a crew of four, two drivers (front and rear), a gunner and a commander, both seating in the oscillating turret, and was powered by a 200 hp (150 kW) 6 liter 12HD horizontally opposed air-cooled 12-cylinder engine (with dual carburetors and 6.6:1 compression, enabling it to run on low-octane petrol). Based on Panhard's two-cylinder automobile engine, it was mounted under the floor of the fighting compartment, which had the unfortunate effect of requiring the turret to be removed to conduct major engine repairs.

=== EBR model 1951 ===
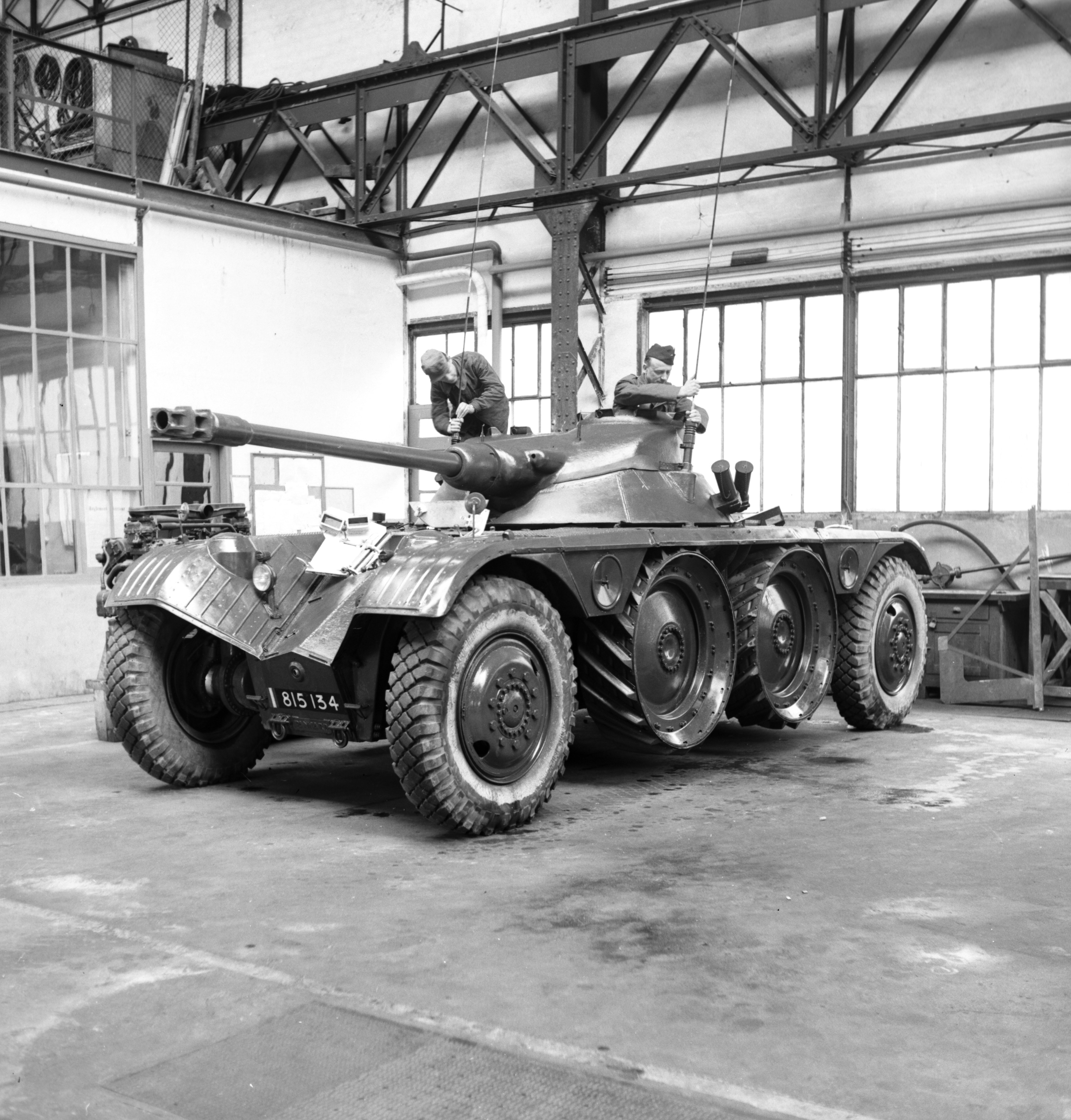
An EBR fresh from the factory in Paris in 1951, being fitted with its radio antennas.

The model 1951 is the first mass-produced model of the EBR, with a total of 836 produced between 1951 and 1954. The model 1951 featured a round-shaped FL 11 oscillating turret armed with a manually loaded 75 mm SA 49 tank gun. The SA 49 gun shared the ammunition and the ballistics of the US 75 mm M3 and M6 guns already used by the M4 Sherman and the M24 Chaffee in service with the French Army.

==== EBR revalorisé ====
650 EBR model 1951 were upgraded (French: revalorisé) between 1964 and 1968, the 75 mm SA 49 tank gun was rebored to a larger 90 mm caliber and fitted with a single baffle muzzle brake to become the CN 90 F2 (factory designation D 924) low-pressure rifled gun.

=== EBR model 1954 ===
The improved 1954 model was developed with the aim of improving the firepower of the reconnaissance units using EBR. 279 EBR model 1954 were produced between 1954 and 1956, they were fitted with the AMX-13's FL 10 oscillating turret, more specifically, the FL 10A2C turret. The 1954 model had a strengthened suspension to support the heavier weight of the FL 10 turret, which was armed with the long 75 mm SA 50 rifled gun fed by an autoloader consisting of two six-rounds ammunition drums located in the turret bustle. The 1954 model was able to carry a total of 36 rounds. The gunner had an APX L 862 monocular gun sight with a ×7.5 magnification.

The 1954 model was phased out in 1964 but a few remained in service in cavalry regiments as command post vehicles. Nicknamed sauterelle (English: grasshopper), these EBRs had their SA 50 guns deactivated and their ammunition racks removed to free up space to fit a chart table and long range radios. Some EBR model 1954 were bought by the Federal Republic of Germany, Indonesia and Portugal (78 units), the latter were subsequently involved in the Portuguese Colonial War.

=== EBR-ETT ===
The ETT Engin de Transport de Troupe English: troop transport vehicle) was an APC variant originally developed for the platoons evolving alongside the EBR in the French army reconnaissance units. Two prototypes were tested between 1956 and 1957, but ultimately were not adopted by the French Army. Finally, 28 units were purchased by the Portuguese Army, to integrate its EBR equipped reconnaissance squadrons.

== Service history ==
France has, since 1935, engaged in the manufacture and use of a prolific line of wheeled armored reconnaissance vehicles armed with weapons with an anti-tank capability. This being the result of reforms initiated by the Light Mechanized Divisions (DLM).

French tactical doctrine required reconnaissance elements to cover and range over a large and extensive battlefield, especially within the context of the slow and high-maintenance tanks of the time. Also of note is the way that tanks are best deployed, massed and concentrated, which prevents their dispersion for safety and for screening.

It is a particular trait of French reconnaissance vehicles to be heavily armed. From the prewar MD 178 armed with a 25 mm anti-tank gun, (which was for the period a significant caliber for such a small vehicle) to the direct successor of the EBR, the AMX-10RC, also used for wheeled reconnaissance, and armed with a powerful 105 mm gun with automatic firing, firepower equal to a main battle tank of the 1980s. A pattern repeated in the AML 90 and the ERC 90 Sagaie.

These reconnaissance systems are not only aimed at discovery and investigation (missions that can be fulfilled by lighter vehicles with lighter weapons), but also with security missions upon the battlefield (for example flank-security and offensive protection), which requires substantial firepower not only to destroy the enemy advance elements, but also to oppose armoured incursions.

A turretless Panhard EBR carried the coffin of French president Charles de Gaulle at his state funeral.

Portugal ordered 50 EBRs and 28 ETTs in 1956. Most of these vehicles were assigned to the Army reconnaissance units stationed in the then Portuguese overseas provinces of Angola and Mozambique, being there at the outbreak of the Portuguese Overseas War and used in its early stages in counter-insurgency operations. In 1974, during the Carnation Revolution, EBR 75 FL10 cars of the Armed Forces Movement confronted M47 Patton tanks of loyalist troops in the Praça do Comércio. The crews of the vehicles of the two sides eventually stood down without incident.

Aside from Portugal and a few newly emerging Francophone states in North Africa, the only export sales of the EBR were small quantities for the Indonesian Army and the West German Bundesgrenzschutz.

== Former operators ==
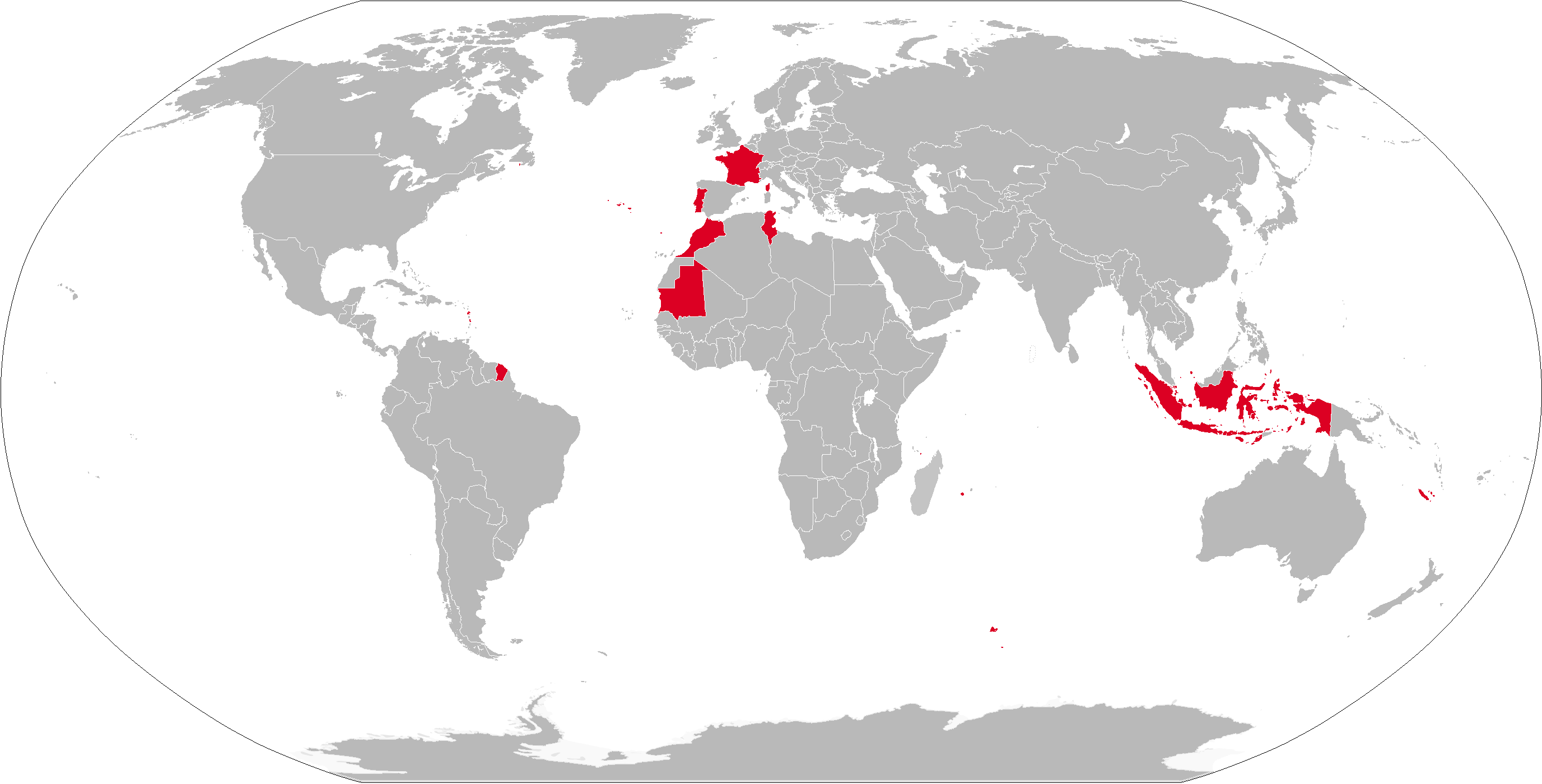
Map with Panhard EBR operators in red

- France
- West Germany
- Indonesia
- Mauritania: 15
- Morocco: 36; 27 operational in 2009.
- Portugal: 51
- Tunisia: 15

== Gallery ==
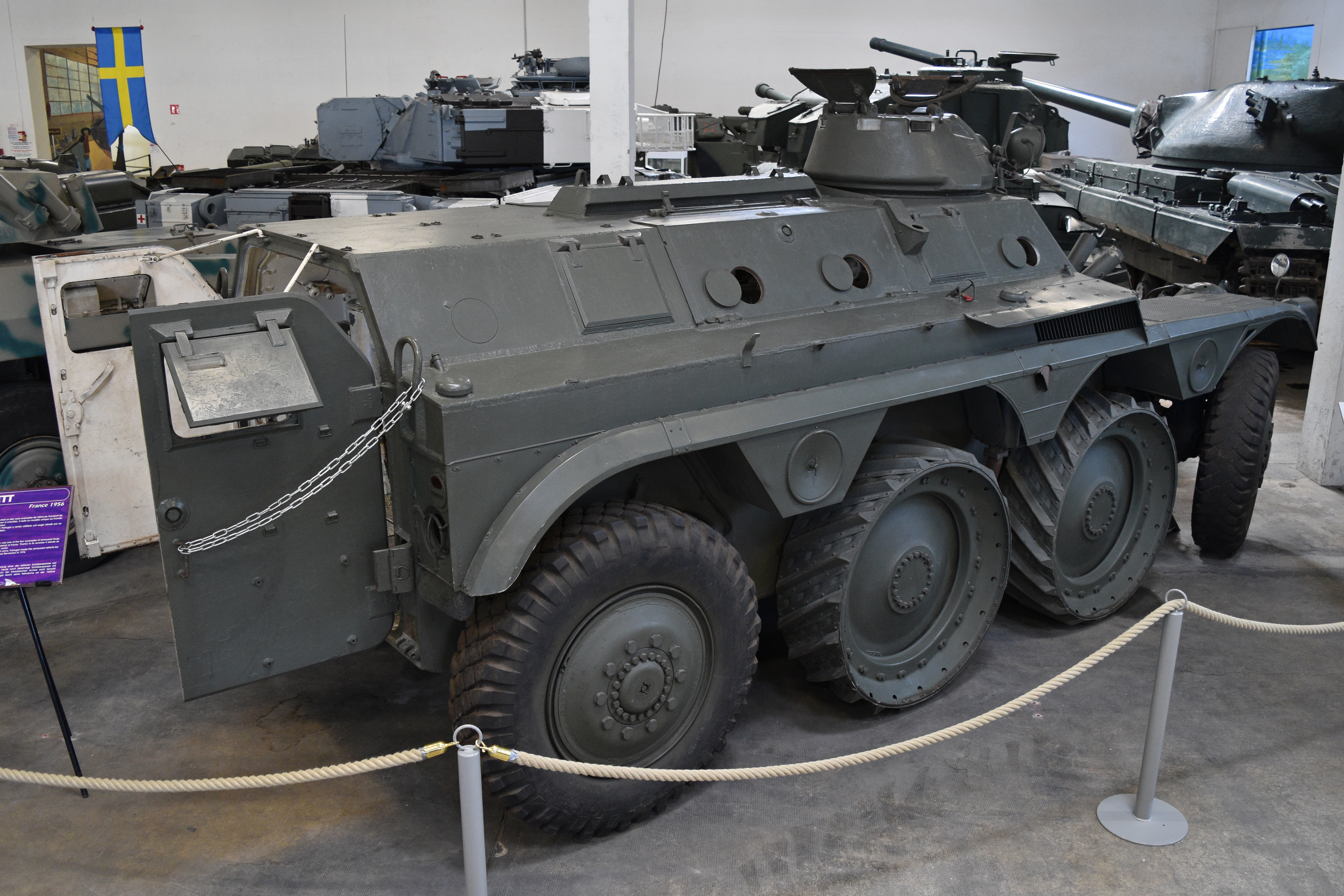

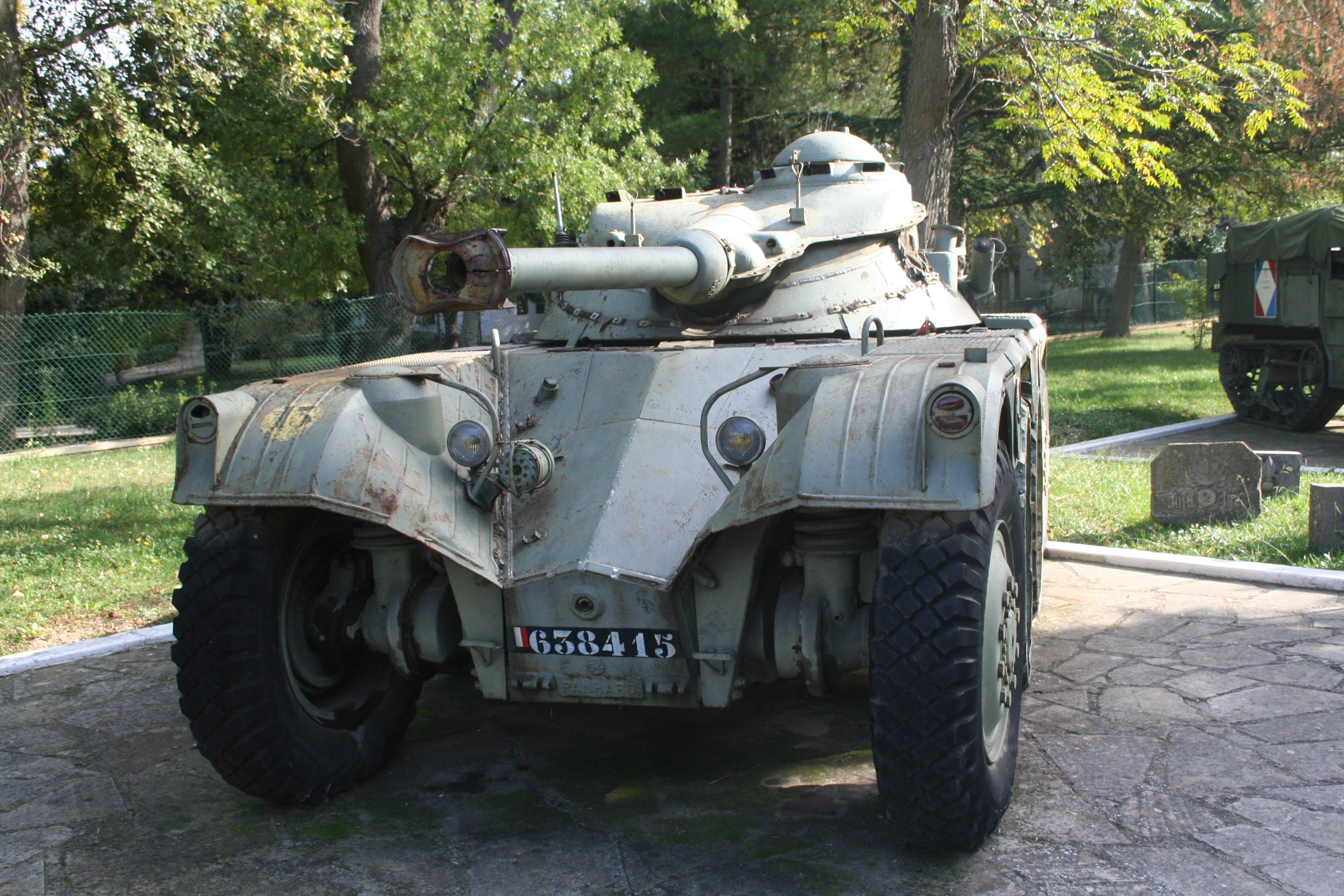

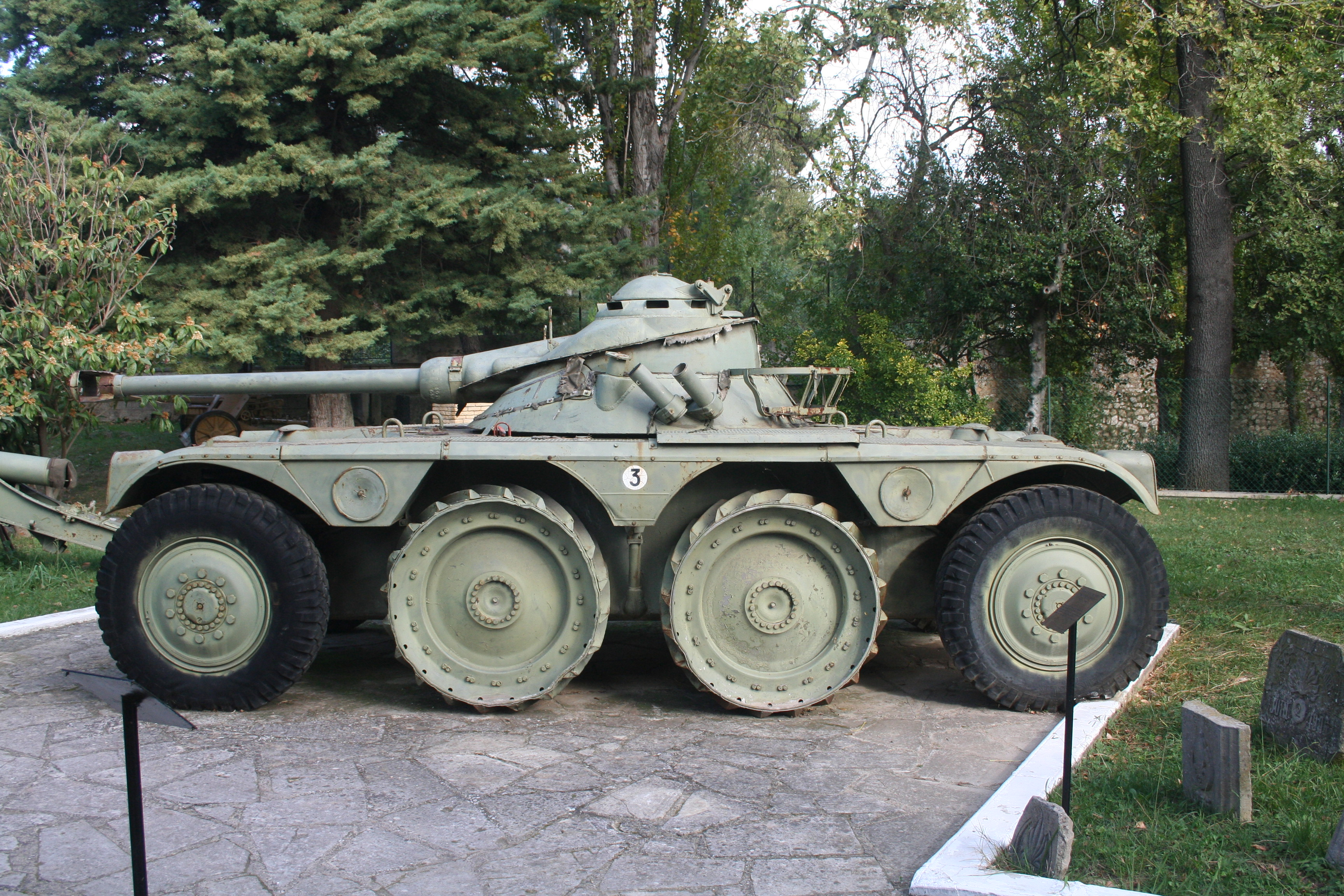

== See also ==
- AMX-50 – (France)
- AMX-13 – (France)
- SK-105 Kürassier – (Austria)
