= Soltam M-66 =

Israeli mortar

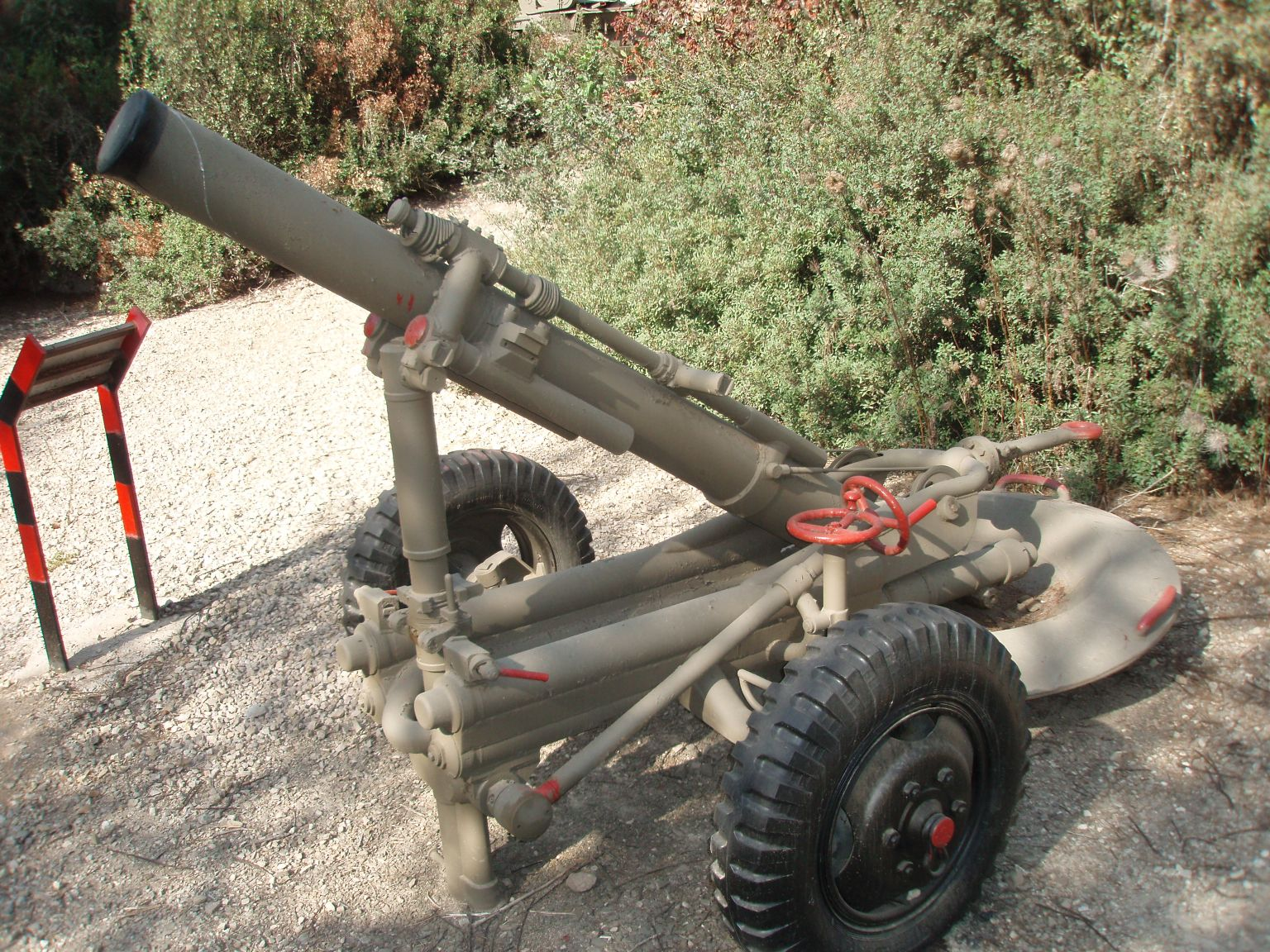
- Soltam M-66 in Beyt ha-Totchan Museum, Zikhron Ya'akov.
- Type: Mortar
- Place of origin: Israel

Service history
- Used by: See operators
- Wars: Six-Day War; Yom Kippur War; Lebanese Civil War; 1978 South Lebanon conflict 1982 Lebanon War; South Lebanon conflict (1985–2000)

Production history
- Designer: Vammas
- Manufacturer: Soltam

Specifications
- Mass: 225–341 kg (496–752 lb)
- Crew: 6-8
- Caliber: 160 mm (6.3 in)
- Elevation: +30° to +80°
- Traverse: -20° to +20°
- Effective firing range: 9,600 m (10,500 yd)

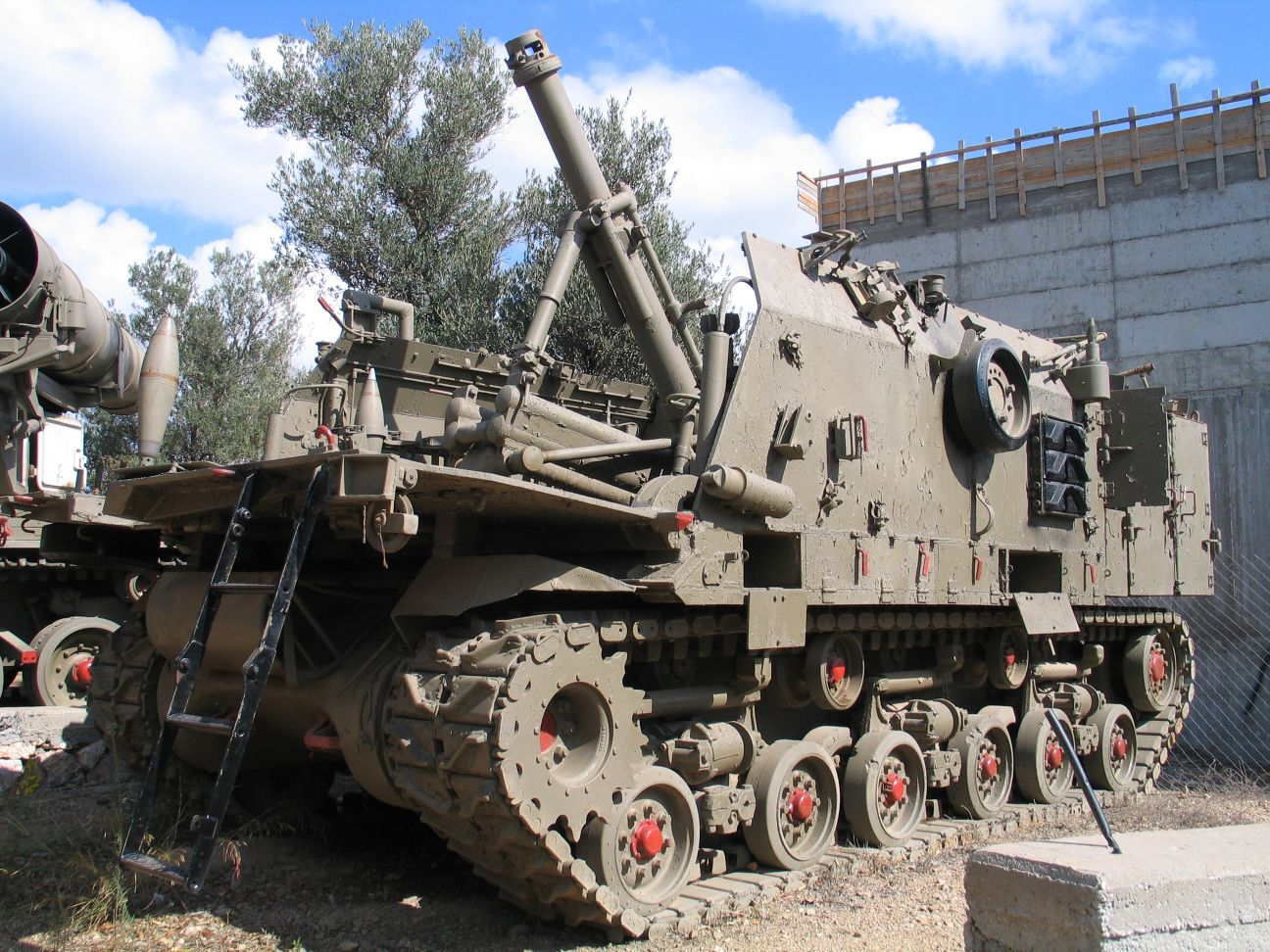
Makmat 160 mm at the Beyt ha-Totchan Museum, Israel

The M-66 is a 160 mm mortar manufactured by Soltam of Israel. The weapon was based on an earlier 160 mm design, the M-58 mortar by Vammas of Finland. It can fire a 38 kg (84 lb) HE bomb out to a maximum range of 9,600 m (10,500 yd) and requires a crew of 6-8 to operate.

In addition to the towed variant, the M-66 was mounted on a Sherman tank chassis, modified with an open-topped compartment with folding front plate, resulting in the Makmat 160 mm which was adopted in 1968.

== Operators ==
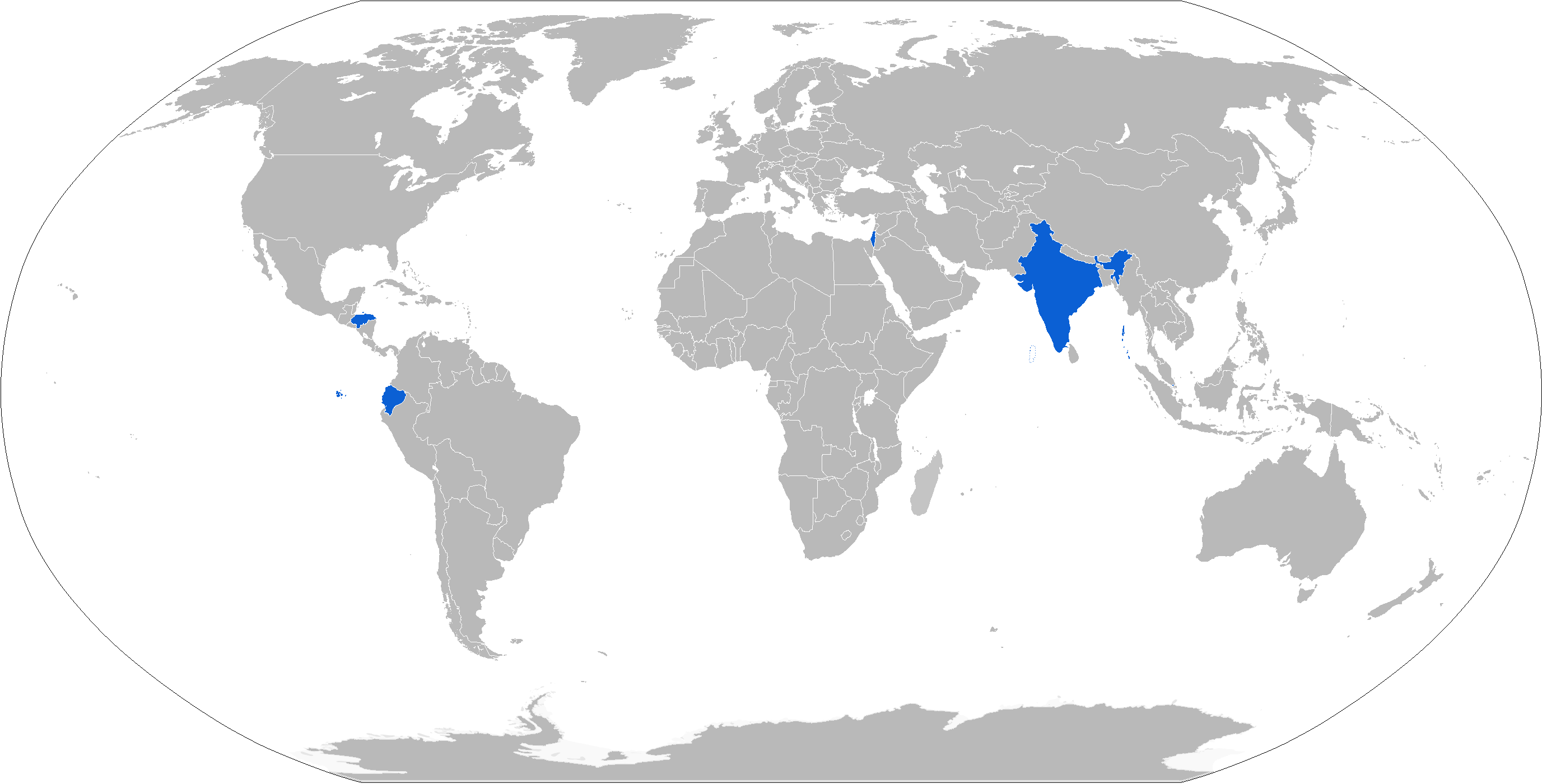
Map with M-66 operators in blue

=== Current operators ===
- (Ecuador) : Ecuadorian Army
- (Honduras) : Honduran Army
- (India) : Indian Army
- : Israel Defense Forces (primary user)

=== Former operators ===
- Lebanese Forces
- South Lebanon Army
- Singapore Army

== See also ==
- Makmat 160 mm - self-propelled artillery produced by mounting Soltam M-66 160 mm mortar on M4 Sherman tank chassis.
- Soltam M-65
- List of weapons of the Lebanese Civil War
