= D-56T =

D-56T tank gun
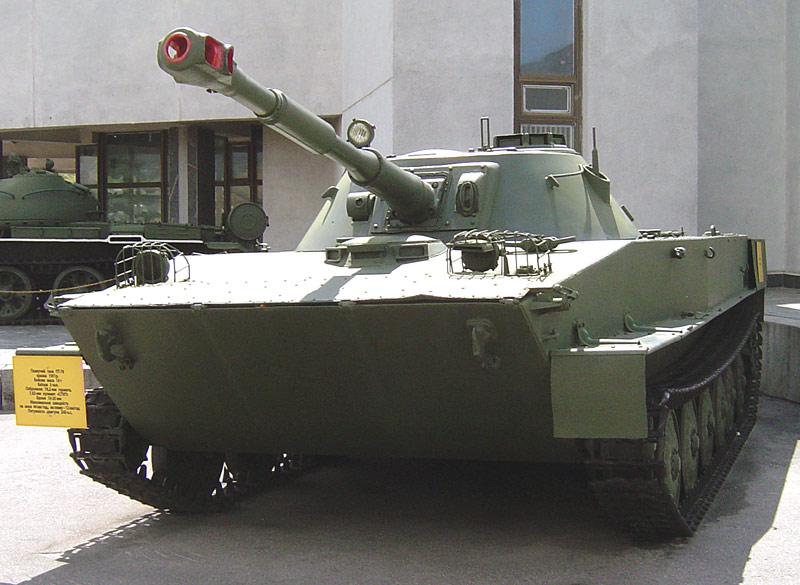
- D-56T gun on a PT-76 light tank
- Type: rifled antitank gun
- Place of origin: Soviet Union

Service history
- In service: 1952–present
- Wars: see PT-76#Combat service

Production history
- Designer: N. Shashmurin and Zh.Y. Kotin

Specifications
- Length: 42 calibers (3.2 metres)
- Calibre: 76.2 mm (3 in)
- Carriage: vehicle mount
- Rate of fire: 6-8 rounds per minute
- Maximum firing range: 1,500 metres (1,640 yards)

The 76.2 mm D-56T series rifled tank gun is the tank gun used on the PT-76, which is the only known armoured vehicle to carry it.

== Description ==
The D-56T is an anti-tank gun of 76.2mm calibre. It can fire five types of rounds, using a manual loader system, it has an effective fire rate of six to eight rounds per minute. It has a max effective range of approximately 1500 meters. This gun is 42 calibers long.

A typical combat ammunition load consists of 24 x OF-350 Frag-HE, 4 x sub-caliber AP-T, 4 x AP-T and 8 x BK-350M HEAT rounds.

The gun is usually mounted in an oval dish-type circular truncated cone turret with flat sloping sides which is mounted over the second, third, and fourth pair of road wheels. All PT-76s have a fume extractor for the main gun at the rear of the turret. Some were fitted with a multi-slotted muzzle brake. Most PT-76s typically feature this gun with a double-baffle muzzle brake, except for the PT-76B, which is typically fitted with the D-56T gun with a two-plane gun stabiliser, a double-baffle muzzle brake and a bore evacuator towards the muzzle.

== Ammunition ==
The D-56T usually saw itself firing five types of anti-tank rounds. Most rounds that were used on the D-56T were HE rounds, with usually a ready combat load having 24 pieces of OF-350 High Explosive Fragmentation ammunition, and 16 other pieces, with three other types of rounds. Common ammunition types were the OF-350 Frag-HE, BR-354P HVAP-T and the BK-354M HEAT-FS.

- BK-354M High Explosive Anti Tank, Fin Stabilised
  - Maximum aimed range: 1,000 m
  - Maximum effective range: 650 in the day, 600 at night
  - Penetration: 200mm at all distances
  - Explosive filler: 0.8kg(1.7lbs) of RDX/wax
- OF-350 Fragmentation, High Explosive
  - Maximum aimed range: 4,000 m
  - Maximum effective range: 600 at night
- BR-354P High-Velocity, Armor-Piercing Tracer
  - Maximum aimed range: 1,060 m
  - Maximum effective range: 650 in the day, 600 at night
  - Penetration: 127 mm point-blank, 50 mm at 1,000 metres

== See also ==
- PT-76
