= SA 50 =

75 SA 50
- Type: Rifled tank gun
- Place of origin: France

Service history
- In service: 1956-present

Production history
- Designer: Arsenal de Bourges (ABS)
- Designed: 1950
- Manufacturer: Arsenal de Bourges (ABS)
- Produced: 1952-1959
- No. built: 2200
- Variants: CN 90 F3 (D 960)

Specifications
- Length: 4.64 m (15 ft 3 in)
- Barrel length: 61.5 calibres
- Shell: 75×597mmR
- Shell weight: 6.4 kg (APC-T shot POT-51A)
- Calibre: 75 mm (2.95 in)
- Barrels: autofrettaged
- Action: semi-automatic horizontal sliding-wedge breech
- Breech: horizontal sliding-wedge
- Recoil: 330 mm
- Carriage: FL 10 or modified D50878 (Israeli Super Sherman) turret
- Elevation: -6° to +14° (FL 10)
- Traverse: 360°
- Rate of fire: up to 14 rounds per minute
- Muzzle velocity: 1000 m/s
- Maximum firing range: 8000 m (with HE shells)
- Sights: APX L 862

The 75 SA 50 (French: 75 mm Semi-Automatique Modèle 1950; English: 75 mm Semi-Automatic 1950 Model) also called 75 Mle 50 or CN 75-50 is a French 75 mm high-velocity rifled gun. Although originally designed for the AMX-13 light tank, the SA 50 has also been used on the EBR wheeled reconnaissance vehicle and foreign medium tanks such as the Israeli upgraded Super Sherman.

== History ==
By the end of 1944, the chief engineer Lafargue considered a more powerful alternative to the 75 mm SA 44 developed for the upcoming ARL-44 transitional tank destroyer. The new 75 mm gun should have ballistic performance similar to the German 7.5 cm KwK 42; which means firing a round weighing a little more than 6 kg at a muzzle velocity close to 1000 m/s. A longer gun barrel (L/70) and an increased chamber volume with a higher chamber pressure were thus required to achieve such performance. The new gun was made from existing components (breech block, gun tube, ...) developed clandestinely during the German occupation. Although not retained for the ARL-44, the gun was later selected for the AMX-13 prototype and was subsequently standardised as 75 mm SA 50.

=== Second life ===
In 1962, the decision was taken to rebore the SA 50 to the internal dimensions of the D 921A 90 mm low-pressure rifled gun (CN 90 F1) of the AML-90, allowing the retrofitted AMX-13 to also use the powerful OCC 90 EMP Mle 62 fin-stabilized HEAT shell but fired at a higher muzzle velocity of 950 m/s. A single baffle muzzle brake replaced the original double baffle muzzle brake.

The re-bored 75 SA 50 took the factory designation of D 960 and was later known as CN 90 F3 (French: CaNon de 90 millimètres modèle F3; English: 90 millimeters gun F3 Model). After a preliminary study and testing carried out between 1964 and 1966, 875 FL 10 turrets were transformed between 1966 and 1970 (860 for France and 10 for Morocco).

== Ammunition ==
- POT-51A : a 6.4 kg APBC-T with a muzzle velocity of 1000 m/s, it is able to penetrate 110 mm of RHA at an angle of 0° at 1000 m.
- PCOT-51P : a 6.7 kg APCBC-T with a muzzle velocity of 1000 m/s, it is able to penetrate 170 mm of RHA at an angle of 0° at 1000 m
- 75 OE : a 6.2 kg high-explosive shell with a muzzle velocity of 750 m/s.
- SC 75/54/40 : a 3.9 kg tungsten carbide APDS with a muzzle velocity of 1310 m/s. It is able to penetrate 300 mm of armour at an angle of 0° at 1000 m or 80 mm at 60° at the same range. Developed in 1956, it was never adopted by the French Army.
- 75 CC : a shaped-charge shell.
- 75 canister : a 6.4 kg canister round developed by Advanced Material Engineering for the Singapore Armed Forces (SAF). The steel-aluminium projectile contains 1200 steel spheres, each 9 mm in diameter and are projected in a 9°cone with a maximum range of at least 200 m.
- 75 APFSDS : a Singapore APFSDS developed in the late 1980s by Singapore Technologies Kinetics Ltd under the codename Project Spider for their upgraded AMX-13 SM1.

== See also ==
=== Weapons of comparable role, performance, and era ===
- British Ordnance QF 17-pounder
- Soviet 85 mm D-70
- United States 76 mm Gun M32A1
