= AMX-50 =

Char M4 / AMX-50 Char moyen A.M.X. de 50 t
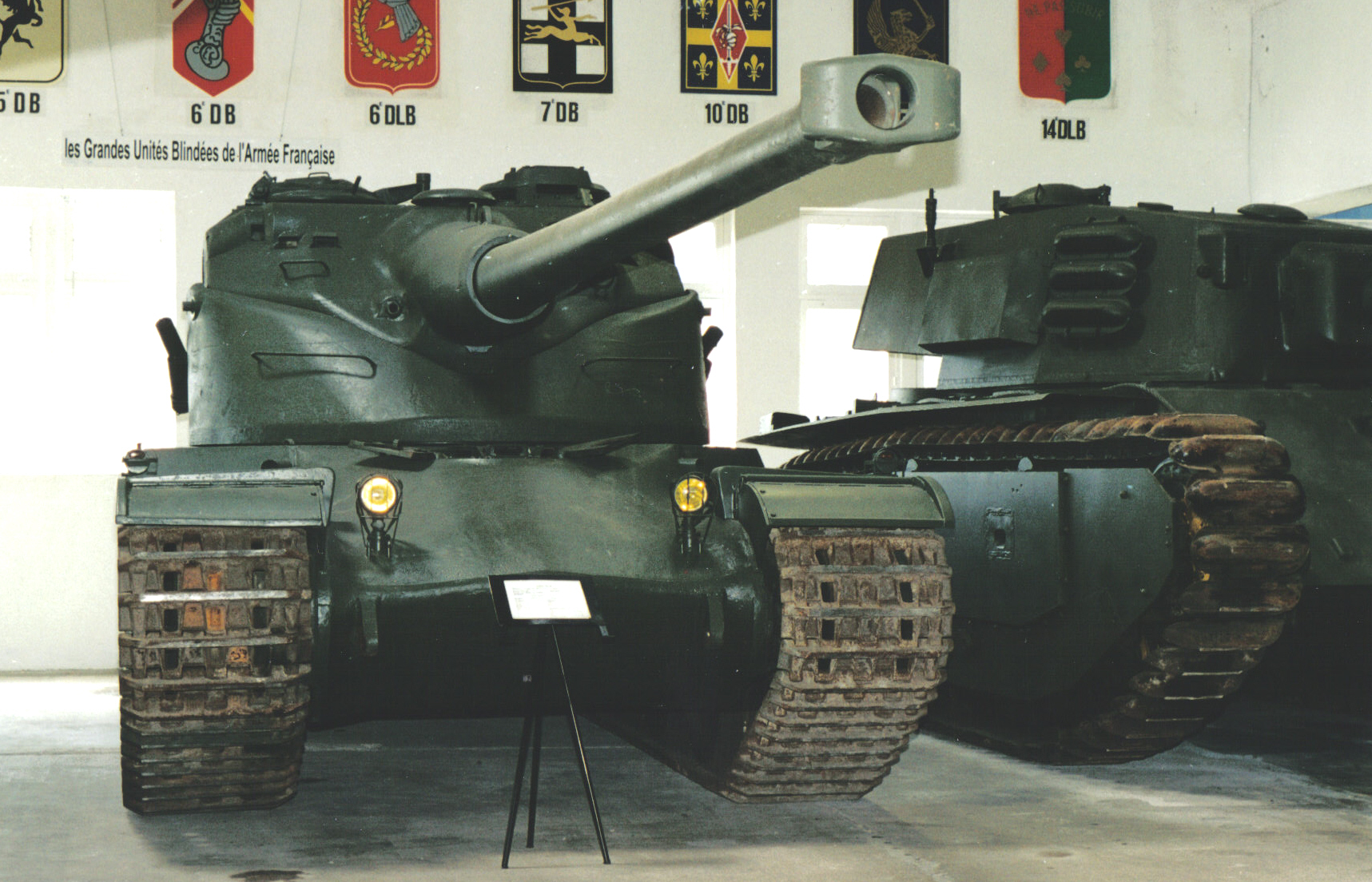
- The AMX 50 (lowered) cast hull with the Tourelle D, at Saumur
- Type: Medium Tank/heavy tank (lowered variant)
- Place of origin: France

Specifications
- Mass: 57.8 metric tonnes (lowered version with D turret)
- Length: 7.35 m (24 ft 1 in)
- Width: 3.4 m (11 ft 2 in)
- Height: 3.35 m (11 ft 0 in)
- Crew: 4
- Armour: 80–120 mm (3.1–4.7 in)
- Main armament: 120mm SA46
- Secondary armament: 2 x 7.5 mm machine guns
- Engine: Maybach HL 295 12VC; 850 HP (1200 HP planned)
- Power/weight: 15 hp/ton
- Suspension: Torsion bar
- Operational range: 250 km (160 mi)
- Maximum speed: 51 km/h (32 mph), 65km/h planned

The AMX-50 (historically stylized AMX 50) is a French heavy tank designed in the immediate post Second World War period. It was proposed as, in succession, the French medium, heavy, and main battle tank, incorporating many advanced features. It was cancelled in the late 1950s due to unfavourable economic and political circumstances after serious delays in development.

== AMX 50 development ==
=== Char M 4 (90 mm) ===
After the Second World War the French Army possessed no modern tanks with a heavy armament. The ARL 44 was being developed, but this vehicle, although ultimately to be armed with a powerful 90 mm anti-aircraft gun, could hardly be called modern, as its suspension system was obsolete. Therefore, already in March 1945 the French industry had been invited to design a more satisfactory vehicle. The same year the Ateliers de construction d'Issy-les-Moulineaux (AMX) company presented its projet 141, a project to build the so-called M 4 prototype, armed with a 90 mm Schneider gun with a 1000 m/s muzzle velocity and comparable in performance to the German 8.8 cm KwK 43.

The M 4 closely resembled the German Tiger II in general form, though the turret was to be made of welded sections; but to limit the weight to a desired thirty tonnes the proportions were rather smaller and the armour had a maximum thickness of just thirty millimetres. Like the later German tanks of the war it had, in this case eight, overlapping road wheels. Part of the project was to study whether a modern torsion bar suspension should be used or the height lowered by ten centimetres through a fitting of leaf or coil springs. Two prototypes of the M 4 were ordered. The Army soon indicated that a protection level offered by 30 mm of armour was unacceptably low. In response the armour was increased to 80 mm. To save weight it was decided to install a novel oscillating turret, designed by the Compagnie des forges et aciéries de la marine et d'Homécourt (FAMH). Nevertheless, when the first prototype, now named the AMX 50 (or French: Char moyen A.M.X. de 50t, "Medium tank, AMX, 50 ton") after its intended weight class, was delivered in 1949, it weighed 53.7 tonnes.

In the winter of 1950 instead of the 90 mm, a 100 mm gun designed by the Arsenal de Tarbes was fitted.

=== AMX 50 (100 mm) ===
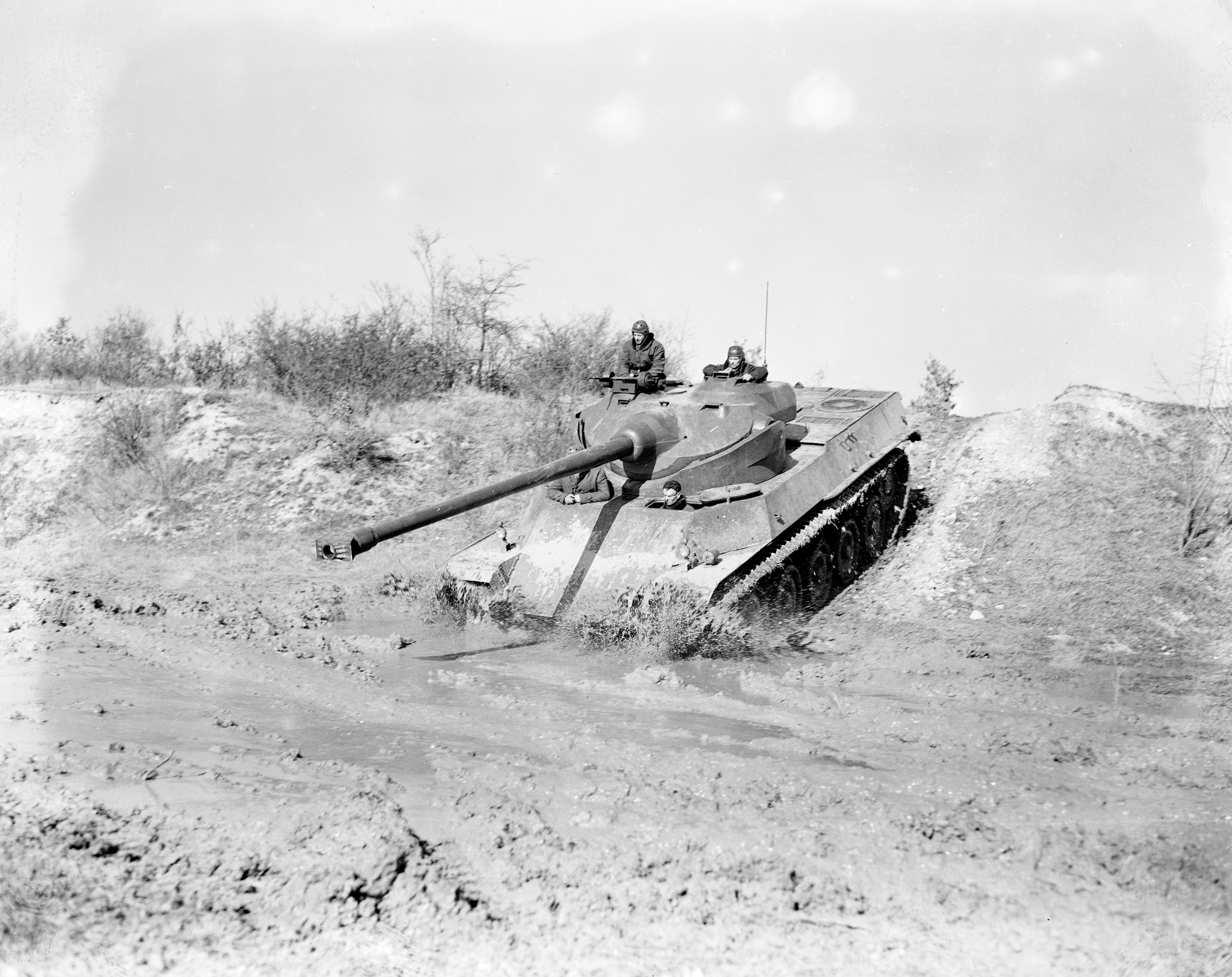
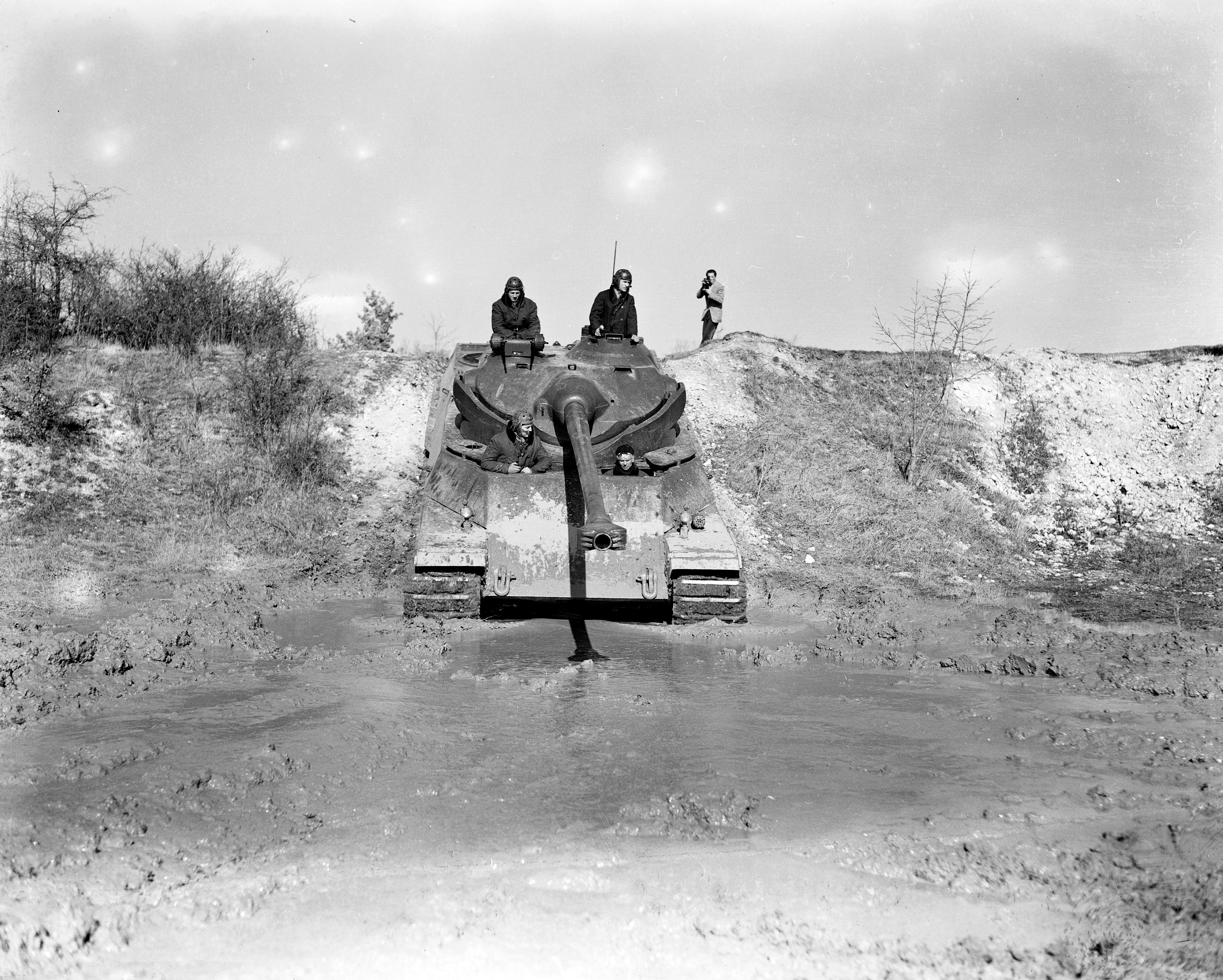
AMX-50 (2nd prototype, 100 mm) during testing

The second prototype (of the now called Char moyen A.M.X. de 50t, "Medium tank, AMX, 50 ton"), with a slightly different turret also with a 100 mm gun, was ready soon after. The prototypes had a length, with gun, of 10.43 m, a width of 3.40 m and a height of 3.41 m. It was intended to fit a 1,200 hp engine to attain a speed much superior to all existing medium tank types. The Maybach HL 295 (a redesigned German gas engine in 1945 captured at Friedrichshafen by Engineer-General Joseph Molinié) and a Saurer diesel engine were tested. Both failed to deliver the required output and maximum speed was no higher than 51 km/h, while the cross-country speed was 20 km/h. The prototypes were tested between 1950 and 1952.

The transmission for the AMX M 4 was developed for the French Army by the German Zahnradfabrik Friedrichshafen (ZF) in 1945. It was a modern five-speed manual gearbox with a two radii double differential steering (Überlagerungslenkgetriebe) integrated. The service brakes were fitted to both output sides of the transmission. They consisted of Argus disk brakes of the type developed by Hermann Klaue, similar to those previously used in the German Tiger and Panther tanks.

=== AMX 50 (120 mm) ===
A third AMX 50 project was begun in August 1951. Ten preseries vehicles were to be built by DEFA (Direction des Études et Fabrications d'Armement, the state weapon design bureau), the first being delivered in 1953. The type was armed with a 120 mm gun, also with a 1,000 m/s muzzle velocity, in response to the perceived threat posed by the Soviet heavy tanks, such as the IS-3 and the T-10. To accommodate the larger gun, an enormous turret was fitted; originally planned in a conventional form, eventually it was decided to also make it of the oscillating type. Armour was increased to a maximum of 90 mm. These changes caused a weight increase to 59.2 metric tonnes.

=== AMX 50 Surblindé (120 mm) ===
From 1954 to 1955, the AMX 50 (120) type was made even heavier, creating the surblindé ("uparmoured") version with a lower turret and a higher hull with a pike nose glacis like the IS-3, bringing weight to about 64 tonnes and the line-of-sight thickness of the armour to 200 mm. As this caused serious mechanical reliability concerns, despite a reinforced suspension, this design was cast aside in favour of a reduced weight design using more cast elements.

=== AMX 50 Surbaissé (120 mm) ===
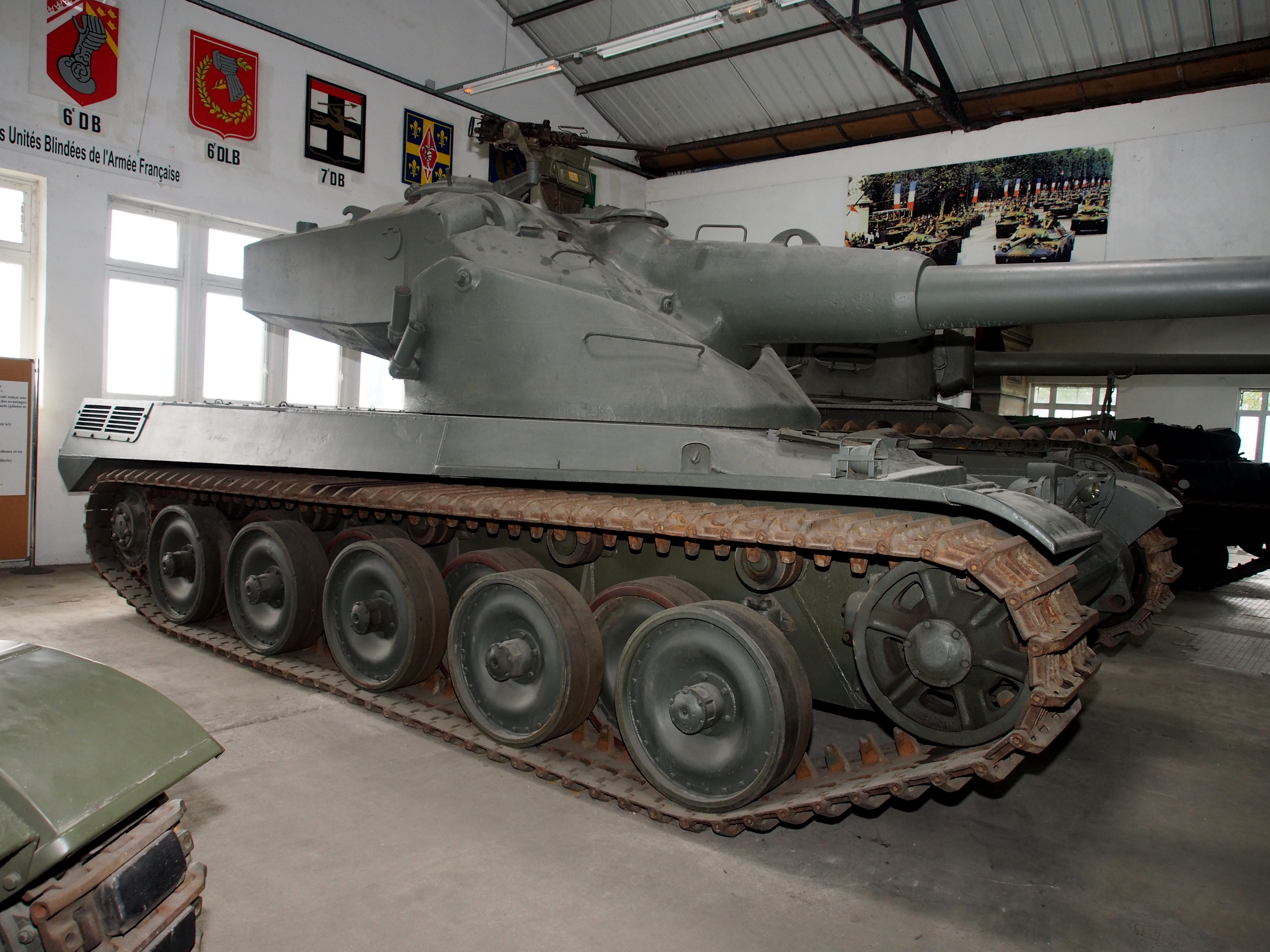
The AMX 50 Surbaissé in Musée des Blindés

From 1956 to 1958, a new design was made, reducing the weight to 57.8 metric tonnes by building a cast lower hull, creating the surbaissé ("lowered") version with a lighter but again taller turret, the Tourelle D (fourth type turret).

As problems with the preferred Maybach engine persisted, despite limiting the desired output to 1,000 hp, from 1955 onwards, a special design team, brought over from Germany, cooperated with the AMX factory to solve them. It was called Gruppe M, after professor Karl Maybach, who personally headed a mission of seventy German engineers. Optimistically, it was at that time projected that the maximum speed could eventually be increased to 65 km/h (40 mph).

In the end, only five complete AMX 50 prototypes were constructed, including the final hull.

== Related development ==
=== CDC AMX ===
Parallel to the M 4, from 1946, AMX designed the Chasseur de char A.M.X. (CDC AMX: "Tank destroyer, AMX"), a lightly armoured 34 tonne tank destroyer based on the M 4 chassis, but fitted with a modern rounded sleek turret for the 90 mm gun. No prototype was built.

=== CA Lorraine ===
The French Lorraine company was tasked with producing a light tank destroyer/assault gun derived from the AMX M4 project, becoming the Canon d'assaut Lorraine (CA Lorraine: "Assault gun, Lorraine"). It was equipped with the same 100 mm SA 47 L/58 gun as used on the AMX 50.

A prototype was under construction in 1950, but was not completed until 1952, and in 1953, the project was terminated, however, the chassis would later form the basis for the Lorraine 40t medium tank and Lorraine 155 mm self-propelled artillery.

=== CA AMX-50 ===
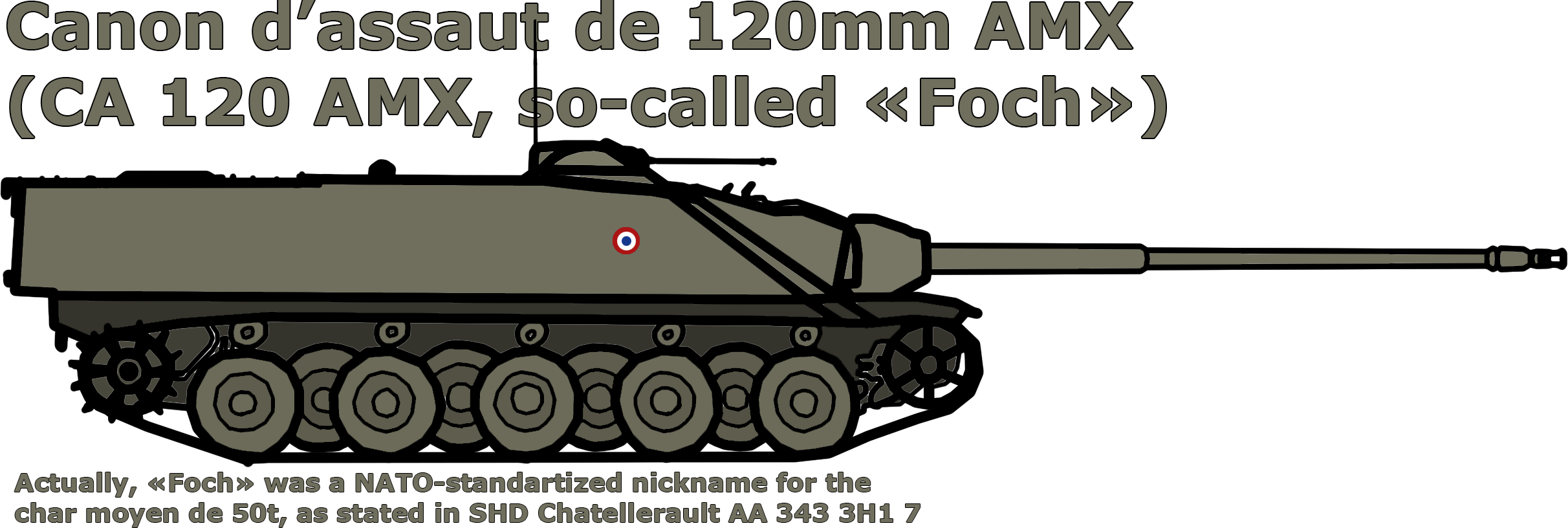
An illustration of the CA AMX-50

Based on the M 4 chassis, in 1950, a prototype was finished of a heavy tank destroyer in the form of a 120 mm self-propelled gun, the Canon d'assaut A.M.X. de 50t (CA AMX 50: "Assault gun, AMX, 50 ton"). It was intended to give long range fire support to the medium AMX 50 "100 mm".

After the tank version was planned to be armed with a 120 mm gun, the self-propelled gun project was abandoned. As it was already obvious in the early 1950s that the AMX 50 might well turn out to be too heavy — the eventual weight of 53.7 tonnes came as a shock — a parallel medium tank project was initiated in 1952: the Lorraine 40t.

=== SOMUA SM ===
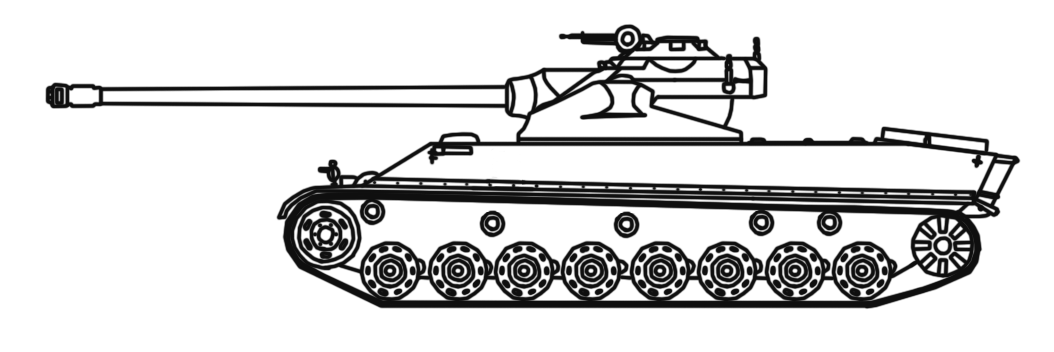
An illustration of the SOMUA SM

In competition with AMX, the SOMUA company also developed a tank to meet the demand for a heavily armed vehicle: the Char SOMUA SM, that however had been conceived as a Char Lourd ("heavy tank") in the sixty tonne weight class from the very beginning, like the M4 paralleling the German Tiger II. The order to build a prototype was given in 1946. The vehicle was delivered in October 1951, weighing 56 tonnes but still lacking an engine.

Both companies had ultimately been forced by the French army to work to identical detailed specifications. As a result, the SOMUA SM closely resembled the AMX 50. It too had an oscillating turret, first with a 90 mm, then with a 100 mm gun. The main external difference was that the nine road wheels were not overlapping. It was not tested until 1953, between January and July, as many parts had not been sufficiently developed; the delay ensured that the type was rejected.

== Description ==
In total, there were five prototypes produced, that considerably differed in the details of their construction. Weighing about fifty-five tonnes, the general AMX 50 project was the heaviest of a trio of French armoured fighting vehicle designs of the postwar period to feature an oscillating turret, the others being the AMX 13 and the Panhard EBR. The oscillating turret design, lacking a conventional gun-mantlet, is in two separate parts, with an upper and lower part connected by two hinge bolts or pivots, the gun being fixed within the upper section. The horizontal movement of the gun, traversing, is conventional, but the vertical movement, elevation, is achieved through the pivoting of the entire upper section with respect to the lower section, which holds the lower sides of the upper section within its trunnions. This method of elevation has two main advantages. Firstly it allows for a smaller turret volume, as no internal space is needed for the vertical movement of the gun breech. Secondly, it allows the use of a relatively simple semi-automatic auto-loader fed by multiround magazines, achieving a very high rate of fire for as long as the magazines were loaded, as the gun is also fixed with respect to the auto-loader located in the back of the upper turret, i.c. a protruding bustle. The automatic loading system worked satisfactorily when the calibre was 100 mm. After the larger 120 mm gun was introduced, reliability suffered, due to the increased weight of the rounds used. The oscillating turret was a very fashionable concept in the 1950s, and also applied in some American projects, such as the T57, T58 and T69. Only the French however, would produce operational systems, having pioneered the concept.

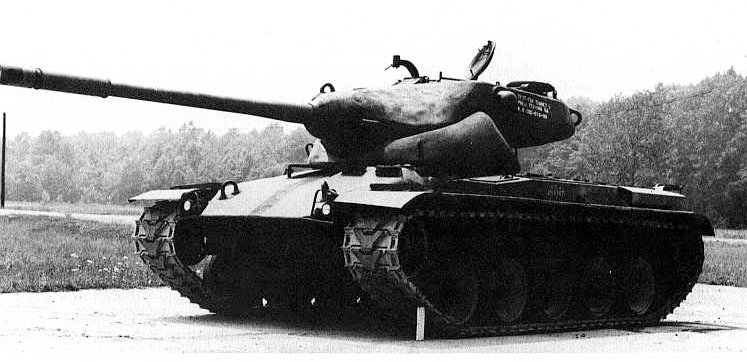
The American T69 resembled the AMX 50

The hull was equipped with a torsion bar suspension designed to ensure a vehicle with good cross-country mobility. The hull and suspension recalled both the German Tiger and the Panther tanks which, having entered French service after the war, were well known and deliberately imitated. Especially the engine deck, the sprockets and the tracks are strongly reminiscent of the German design style. The nine overlapping tyred road wheels each side, were however much smaller. The French engineers had not been aware at first that the much admired German overlapping design had been motivated by a shortage of high quality rubber, necessitating large road wheels to lower tyre tension, which then were made overlapping to better distribute the load pressure. As France would have no trouble obtaining rubber of the desired quality, this feature was superfluous. Therefore, the road wheels were made smaller, compared to the first design proposal, both to save weight and lower the profile of the tank, which was quite high due to a deep hull, a problem only changed in the fifth prototype. The track now had to be supported by five top rollers. The overlapping system as such was maintained in all prototypes; with smaller wheels it allowed for nine instead of the originally planned eight wheels, five forming the outer, four the inner row.

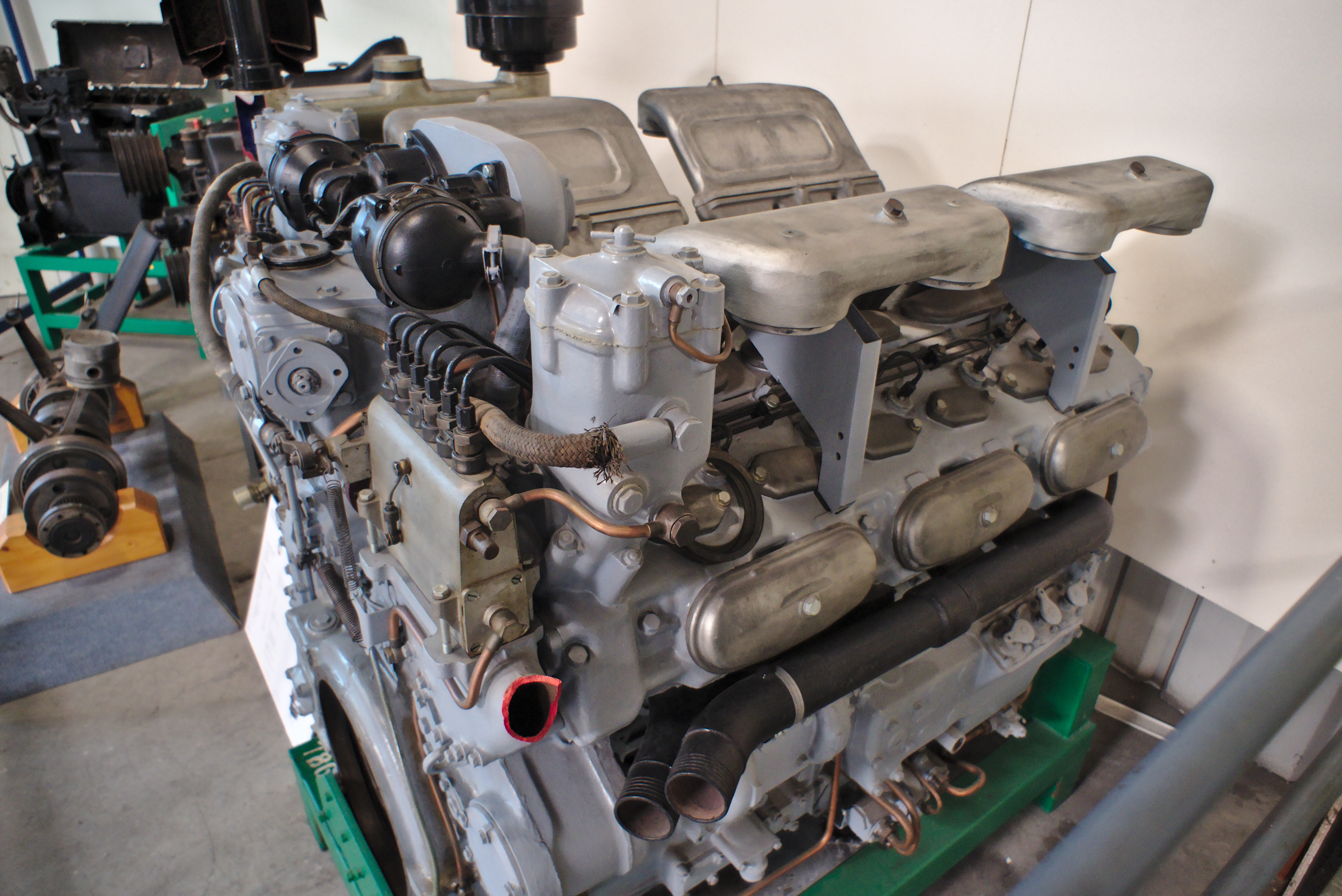
Maybach HL 295 V12 Engine for the AMX 50

The engine and transmission system was in the rear of the vehicle with rear drive sprockets. The transmission was derived from the ZF of the Panther. The functions of final drive and steering were combined in a single assembly; for each gear two turning radii could be selected. The engine was the Maybach HL295 12-cylinder of 29.5 litres, using fuel injection combined with spark ignition. The project goal was to bring the engine output to 1200 hp, implying a very favourable hp/litre ratio of over forty. This proved to be unrealistically ambitious, given the level of technological development at the time; in reality not even a ratio of thirty was reliably attained. The German mission considered this an embarrassing failure, best forgotten.

The hull sides were vertical, as in the case of the Tiger, while the front of the hull was in the first three prototypes evenly inclined at approximately 40 degrees from the horizontal, using sloped armour similar to that of the Panther and Tiger II. The corners between the glacis and the sides were truncated. The first two prototypes had a frontal protection level equivalent to about 120 mm "line-of-sight" thickness in the horizontal plane. The type was thus not particularly heavily armoured for its time. The armour was intended to provide protection against high-velocity guns in general use at the end of the Second World War. The weight increase with the third prototype was mainly caused by the larger turret and even in its fourth "uparmoured" form, doubling the frontal armour thickness, the AMX 50 was less well protected than its American and British competitors, themselves inferior in armour to the Soviet heavy tanks they had been created to fight. The fifth prototype used a lower cast hull, with a rounded frontal section for a better weight efficiency.

Above the massive hull, there was the oscillating turret, smaller, lighter and more compact than that of the Tiger; the sloped face of the upper part had a thickness of 85 mm. In the turret rear back there was the commander's cupola, well equipped with optical equipment. The turret had an optical rangefinder. The first two prototypes had twin 7.5 mm Reibel machine guns placed on top of the roof as an AA-weapon, a third was coaxial. In the first design proposal for a 120 mm version, the conventional turret had a high cupola armed with both a machine gun and a 20 mm MG 151 rapid fire cannon. However the third and fourth "120 mm" oscillating turret prototypes had a single 7.5 mm AA machine gun and a second 7.5 mm coaxial machine gun. For the production vehicles it was considered to install a coaxial 20 mm gun; lighter armoured targets could then be engaged without depleting the limited ammunition stock in the turret magazines. Despite the auto-loader, the crew was four: a second man was seated in the hull, functioning as radio-operator, but mainly needed to replenish the turret magazines, holding nine rounds each, from the hull ammunition stocks.

== Design policy ==
The AMX 50, as originally planned, would have been a medium rather than a heavy tank, France being the first of the tank-producing nations to abandon the heavy tank class. It was supposed to be light, well armed and above all mobile. When the first two prototypes were made, low weight had already been sacrificed in favour of a high protection level, but it was still supposed to be a quite agile vehicle, in the 45 - 50 tonne weight class, with a hp/tonne ratio of over twenty. Expectations were high: as General Molinié recounted to express his irony, it was hoped to create a tank with the protection of the Panther, the firepower of the Tiger, the mobility and abundance of the T-34, the reliability of the M4 Sherman and all that weighing less than the M26 Pershing. At that time France hoped to regain its position as a Great Power; rebuilding its armaments industry served this goal. To build a powerful indigenous tank was however not merely a question of national prestige. Europe as a whole was trying to recover from the devastations caused by the war and to assert a modicum of independence towards the two superpowers, the US and the USSR. To this end in 1948 the Treaty of Brussels was signed, which among other things was also a common defence agreement. The AMX 50, superior in armament and mobility to the existing American and British designs, was seen as the logical candidate for a common European tank, to equip the future armies of the Western European Union defence organisation. The prototypes were proudly displayed during the 1950 Bastille Day parade. The project was only an independent development in the technological sense: it was hoped that the Americans would fund such a tank, as the financial position of the European states would not allow them to rearm.

That same year, the situation changed suddenly and fundamentally due to the outbreak of the Korean War. Quickly the USA recommenced medium tank mass production, of the new M47 Patton. When this tank proved to be unsatisfactory, an even more advanced type was taken into production for the American forces, the M48 Patton. Thousands of superfluous M47s were leased for free to the European allies, France included. The AMX 50 was suddenly made redundant as a medium tank, despite a "100 mm" prototype being sent in 1952 to the Aberdeen Proving Grounds for testing, proving successful.

To save the project, a new role was found in the Soviet heavy tank threat. In the early 1950s, NATO tacticians were worried by the strong armour of the Soviet vehicles, that seemed to be immune to the guns of the existing Western types. In response Britain would develop the Conqueror and the USA the M103 heavy tank; abandoning the SOMUA SM, it was decided to let the AMX 50 evolve into a comparable type, even though other French heavy tank projects were in progress, such as the Char de 70 tonnes, a sort of "AMX 70". Already having a large chassis, the AMX 50 could in principle easily be adapted to carry the desired 120 mm gun — a derivation by the Atelier du Havre of the American gun, using the same ammunition — and had the advantage of a very powerful engine. In practice there were many obstacles. Room could in fact only be found by increasing the height of the lower turret half, negating the advantages of the oscillating concept and creating a dangerous shot trap. The "uparmoured" version, with its deeper hull and flatter turret, was specially designed to counter this and make the vehicle immune in long range fire engagements, but further increased weight. In 1955 the AMX 50 was nevertheless very close to being ordered by the French government, that expected to produce the type for the reconstituted German Army also. A production was planned of a hundred for 1956. This decision had to be delayed however, due to the fact the engine problems had not been solved: reliability could only be assured if the output was limited to 850 hp, causing a mediocre hp/tonne ratio of about 13:1.

The delay proved fatal to the project. In the late 1950s, swift advances in hollow charge technology made heavy tanks increasingly vulnerable. Mobility thus gained a priority over protection and the very concept of a heavy tank became obsolete. As a result, the project was changed again in intention, now trying to present itself as an agile main battle tank, with the same gun as the Conqueror but much lighter and more powerful. This failed as it was much too large and expensive; oscillating turrets also became unpopular as they were inherently difficult to protect against nuclear and chemical contamination. The engine problems with the Maybach were never overcome and lowering the hull to save weight, as was done for the final prototype, made it impossible to install a larger engine. Recognizing that the problem of combining excellent mobility with heavy armour was for the time being irresolvable, the AMX 50 project was terminated in 1959; the priority given to mobility demanded a new design concept, leading to the AMX 30, the lightest MBT of its time. Only in the early 1980s would France again attempt to combine heavy armour and armament in its tank designs, beginning with the later AMX 32 prototypes. The AMX 50 would for France not be a complete waste of time and effort however, as much technological knowledge had been gained from which the AMX 30 would profit. E.g. the range finder of the AMX 50 was also used by the AMX 30.

In the Musée des Blindés at Saumur an AMX 50 is shown, a combination of the last cast hull and the Tourelle D.
