= T57 heavy tank =

120 mm Gun Tank T57
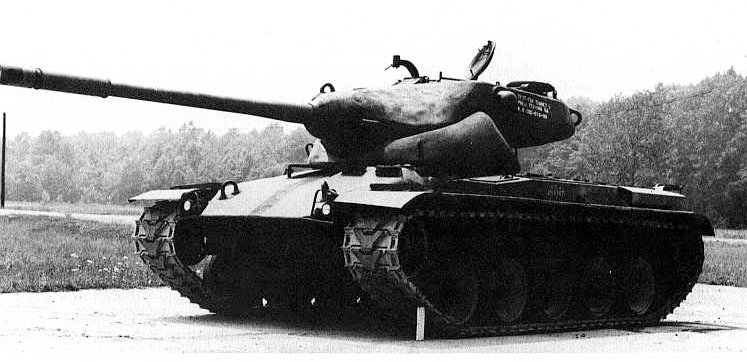
- The T69 tank, which the T57 bore extreme resemblance to, despite the latter having a larger calibre gun.
- Type: Heavy tank
- Place of origin: United States

Service history
- Used by: See Operators

Production history
- Designed: 1951
- No. built: 2 turrets built

Specifications
- Mass: 54.3 tonnes (59.9 short tons; 53.4 long tons)
- Length: 9.3 m (30 ft 6 in) (hull only)
- Width: 3.63 m (11 ft 11 in)
- Height: 3.08 m (10 ft 1 in)
- Crew: 4 (commander, gunner, loader, driver)
- Armor: Cast homogeneous armor Front upper glacis: 127 mm (5.0 in) @ 60° Front lower glacis 114.3 mm (4.50 in) @ 45° Sides:76.2 mm (3.00 in) @ 0° Rear: 38.1–25.4 mm (1.50–1.00 in) @ 30° - 60° Turret front: 127 mm (5.0 in) @ 60°
- Main armament: 120 mm T179 tank gun
- Secondary armament: 1 x coaxial 7.62 mm M37 light machine gun 1 x 12.7 mm M2 Browning heavy machine gun on a turret pintle mount
- Engine: Continental AV-1790-7 V12 gasoline 810 hp (600 kW) at 2300 rpm to 690 hp (510 kW) at 2100 rpm
- Power/weight: 14.9 hp/tonne
- Transmission: General Motors CD-850-3 5 gear transmission
- Suspension: Torsion bar suspension
- Operational range: 130 km (81 mi)
- Maximum speed: 35 km/h (22 mph) on road

The T57 heavy tank was an experimental heavy tank developed by the American military during the Cold War era as a further development of the M103 heavy tank. Featuring heavy armor and a long range 120 mm rifled gun, the T57 was supposed to serve as a replacement to the M103 in service with American heavy tank units in Europe. Armor on the hull front was to range between 5–8 in (130–200 mm) in thickness and the turret was to be 5.98 in (152 mm) at maximum on all sides. Like the French AMX 50 project, it was to feature an oscillating turret and was also to receive a 153 mm gun. Experiments were also conducted to investigate mounting a 203 mm gun, but this was soon found to be infeasible. When multiple problems were discovered in the turret oscillation system on account of the excess weight of the heavily armored turret and the gun, the project was dropped.

== Design ==
=== Armament ===
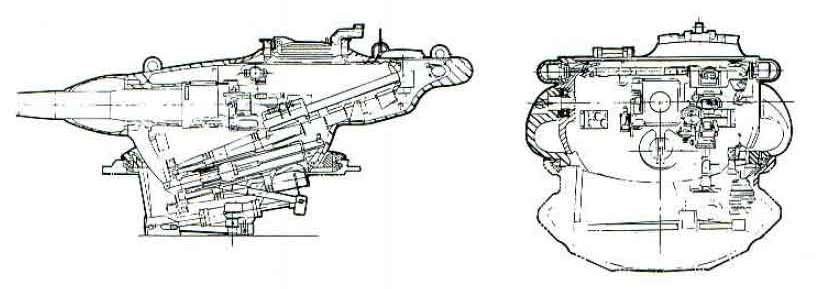
T57 cutaway turret schematic

The T57 was armed with the 120 mm T179 rifled tank gun, a derivative of the T123E1 gun found on the failed T43 tank. The gun was mounted to the T169 mount located inside the vehicle's oscillating turret, which allowed for a maximum of 15 degrees of gun elevation or -8 degrees of depression by shifting the turret structure up and down rather than the gun itself. The T169 featured a hydrospring gun recoil system. The T179 was able to fire a variety of ammunition, including T284 armor piercing (AP) shells, T308 HEP shells, T275 high explosive (HE) and T309 high-explosive anti-tank (HEAT) rounds. The AP rounds were tested to be able to penetrate 10.8 inches (270 mm) of homogeneous plate at 1,000 yards (910 m) or 9.8 inches (250 mm) at 2,000 yards (1,800 m), while the HEAT round was able to penetrate 16 inches (410 mm) of plate. The T179 was reloaded by an autoloader system that had an estimated firerate of 30 rounds per minute. Due to the large size of the one-piece ammunition, a maximum of 18 rounds were able to be carried.

=== Protection ===
The T57 was well protected for a tank at its time; it featured armor heavier than the M103 heavy tank despite using a hull based on its design. All of the armor of the tank was of cast homogeneous armor. The frontal upper glacis featured upwards of 5.0 in (130 mm) of armor sloped at 60 degrees while the lower glacis featured 4.5 in (110 mm) of armor at 45 degrees. The sides of the vehicles were 3.0 in (76 mm) thick while the rear was 1.0 to 1.5 in (25 to 38 mm) thick. The oscillating turret was the most armored section of the vehicle, with a 5.0 in (130 mm) plate angled at 60 degrees. The gun mantlet was 4.0 to 10.0 in (100 to 250 mm) thick at 45 degrees. The sides of the turret were 2.75 to 5.35 in (70 to 136 mm) thick at 20 to 40 degrees of angling while the rear of the turret was 1.5 in (38 mm) thick as was the roof of the tank. The belly of the vehicle was 0.5 to 1.5 in (13 to 38 mm) thick. The hull of the vehicle retained the iconic rounded cast steel "beak" design of the frontal hull seen on both the M103 and M48 tanks. The armor of the T57 was supposed to provide immunity for the vehicle against all existing Soviet anti-tank weapons at the intended engagement ranges of the vehicle. Heavy emphasis was placed on the turret armor due to the intention for the T57 and other NATO heavy tanks to provide long range fire in hull down positions.

=== Propulsion ===
The T57 was powered by a Continental AV1790 12 cylinder air-cooled gasoline engine that could propel the vehicle to a maximum of 35 mph (56 km/h), a comparable speed to the M103 tank which utilized the same engine. This was however far slower than medium tanks at the time such as the M48 and Soviet T-54/T-55, which could easily reach 40–50 mph (64–80 km/h). A significant downside of the T57 was its very low range of 80 mi (130 km) due to its very inefficient engine, a similar issue that had also befallen the M103.

	T57	T58
Length (gun forward)	449.3 in (11.4 m)	425.8 in (10.8 m)
Width	143.0 in (3.6 m)	
Height	104.5 in (2.7 m) (over turret roof)	125.0 in (3.2 m) (over turret hatch)
Ground clearance	18.0 in (45.7 cm)	15.0 in (38.1 cm)
Top speed	22 mph (35 km/h)	
Fording	48 in (1.2 m)	
Max. grade	60%	
Max. trench	7.5 ft (2.3 m)	
Max. wall	27 in (0.7 m)	
Range	80 mi (130 km)	
Power	810 hp (600 kW) at 2800 rpm	
Power-to-weight ratio	13.5 hp/ST (11.1 kW/t)	12.3 hp/ST (10.1 kW/t)
Torque	1,575 lb⋅ft (2,140 N⋅m) at 2200 rpm	
Weight, combat loaded	119,800 lb (54,340 kg)	132,000 lb (59,870 kg)
Ground pressure	12.4 psi (85 kPa)	13.6 psi (94 kPa)
Main armament	T179 120 mm gun	T180 155 mm gun
Elevation, main gun	+15° / −8°	+12° / −8°
Traverse rate	15 seconds/360°	20 seconds/360°
Elevation rate	4°/second	
Main gun ammo	18 rounds (8-round magazines)	32 rounds (6-round magazines)
Firing rate	30 rounds/minute	23 rounds/minute

== History ==
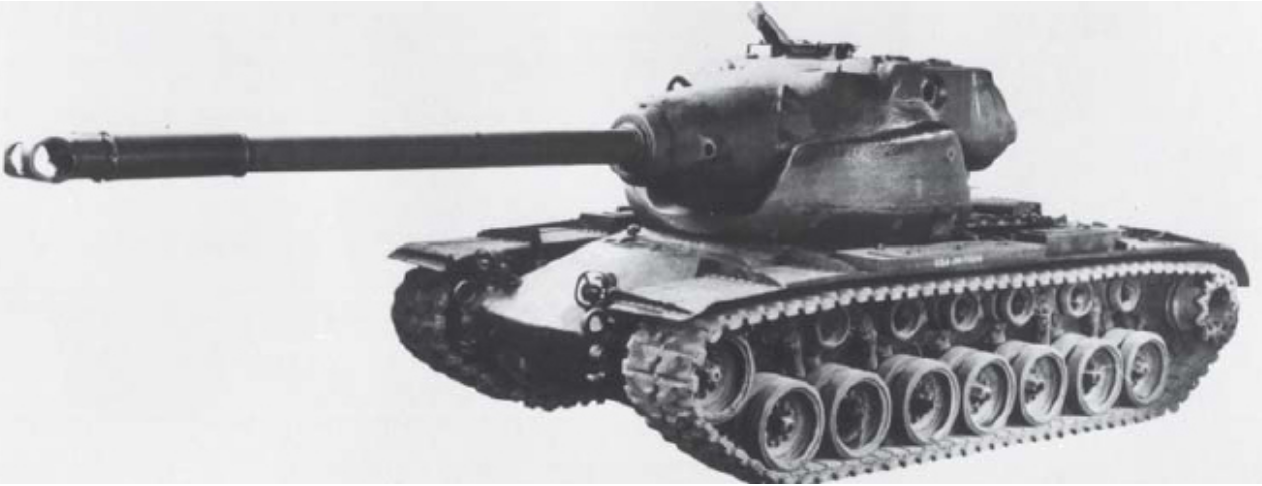
T58 without a rangefinder installed

The T57 project was commenced on 12 October 1951 to design a 120 mm armed tank with an oscillating turret and autoloader. The initial design of the autoloader was cylindrical, however this was rejected by the Army Field Forces because such a design would take up an enormous space inside the turret bustle and limit round capacity to a maximum of 11. The Rheem Manufacturing Company was contracted to design and produce two pilot vehicles. However, the T57 was never completed and only two turrets were constructed, with both being mounted on T43 hulls for trials. On January 17 the US Ordinance Committee cancelled the project with both turrets scrapped and the hulls returned to a supply depot for future usage. Another project arose with the T77 120mm Gun Tank, which planned to mount the T57 turret to a M48 Patton tank hull, which was never completed. The failure of the T57 has been attributed to shifting doctrines in tank design at the time, with American designers progressing to the modern concept of main battle tanks that combined the mobility of medium tank, armor and firepower of a heavy tank in a lighter package, rendering heavy tanks obsolete.

== See also ==
- T110 heavy tank, a later American heavy tank design
- T69 tank, a later American medium tank design with an oscillating turret

== Sources ==
- Hunnicutt, Richard Pearce (1988). Firepower: A History of the American Heavy Tank. Novato, California: Presidio Press. ISBN 0-89141-304-9.
