= T71 =

T71 may refer to:

== Military vehicles ==
- 90 mm Gun Motor Carriage T71, an American prototype self-propelled gun
- HMS Cicala (T71), a gunboat of the Royal Navy
- INS Kora Divh (T71), a patrol vessel of the Indian Navy
- T71 Light Tank, an American American proposed light tank

== Other uses ==
- Cooper T71, a British racing car
- Cuero Municipal Airport, in Cuero, Texas, United States
- T71 Dudelange, a Luxembourger basketball club
