= T69 =

T69 may refer to:

- T69 (tank), an American tank
- AnsaldoBreda T-69, a tram of the West Midlands Metro
- Arizona State Route T-69
- Hunter T 69, a British-built trainer aircraft
- INS Car Nicobar (T69), a patrol vessel of the Indian Navy
- Type 69 Chinese tank
