= Oscillating turret =

Two-part gun turret with elevation hinge

Animation showcasing the basic elevation function of an oscillating turret

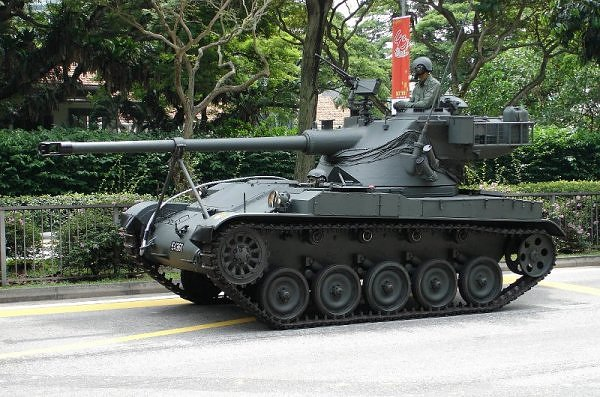
The French AMX-13, known for its oscillating turret

An oscillating turret is a form of turret for armoured fighting vehicles, both tanks and armoured cars. The turret is unusual in being made of two hinged parts. Elevation of the gun relies on the upper part of the turret moving relative to the lower part.

Oscillating turrets have rarely been used. Their only widespread use was on two French designs (the AMX-13 light tank and the Panhard EBR armoured car), the Swedish 15,5 cm Bandkanon-1 self-propelled artillery system, and the Austrian SK-105 Kürassier, which uses an AMX-13 derived turret.

== Design ==
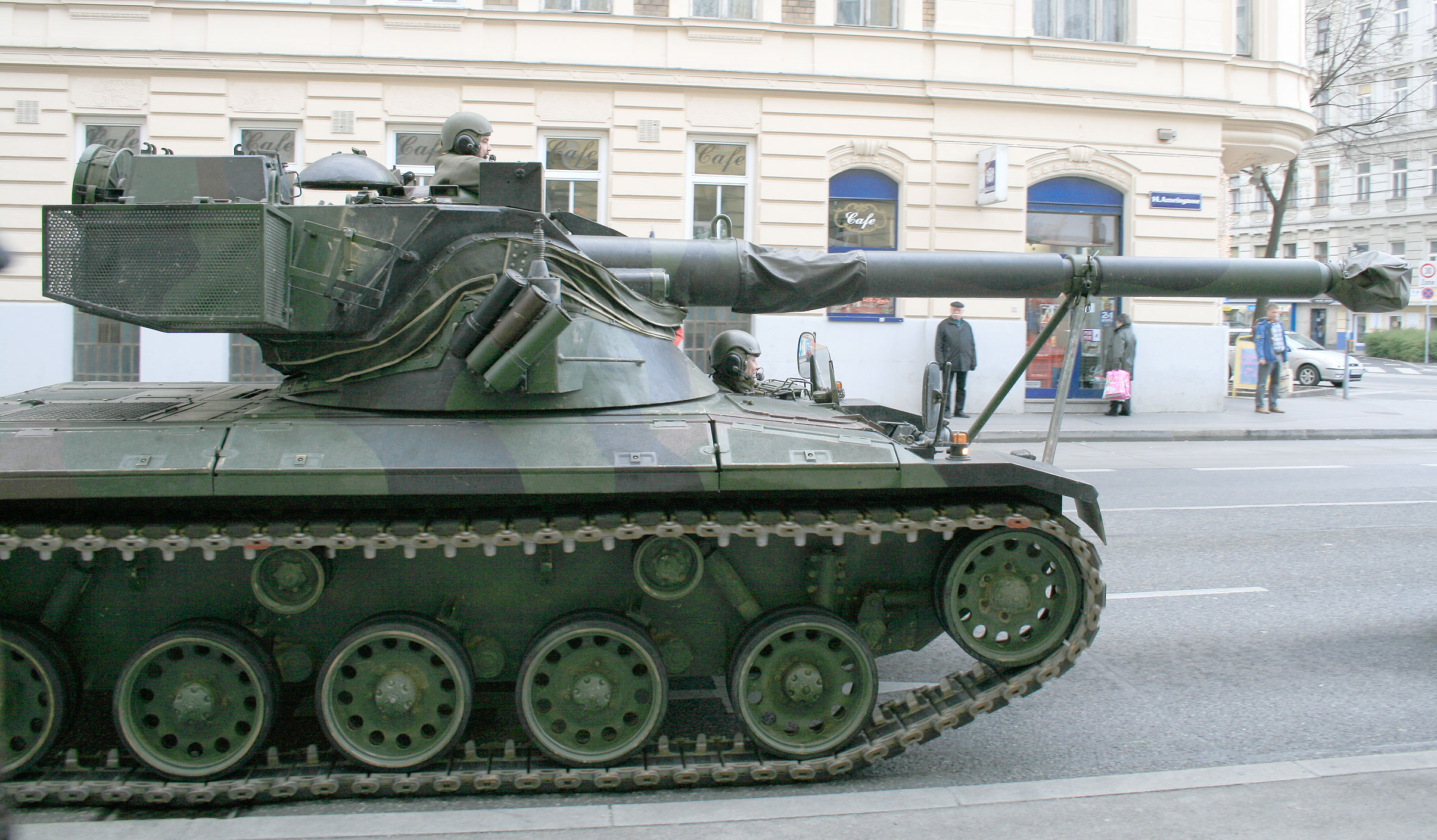
SK-105 Kürassier, showing the low height of the turret above the gun barrel

The turret consists of upper and lower parts, joined by a trunnion. The gap between these two parts is often covered by a visible rubber or canvas bellows.

The gun itself is fixed to the upper part of the turret. Elevation of the gun is achieved by tilting the entire upper part of the turret. In conventional designs, the gun is mounted inside the one-piece turret by a trunnion, and its elevation is changed by tilting on that trunnion while the turret remains in fixed position relative to the hull. Traverse in both designs is achieved by rotating the turret.

In oscillating turrets where the oscillating part of the turret is enclosed gives the advantage that the gunner and loader are always in line with the gun allowing easier aiming and loading.

== Pros and cons ==
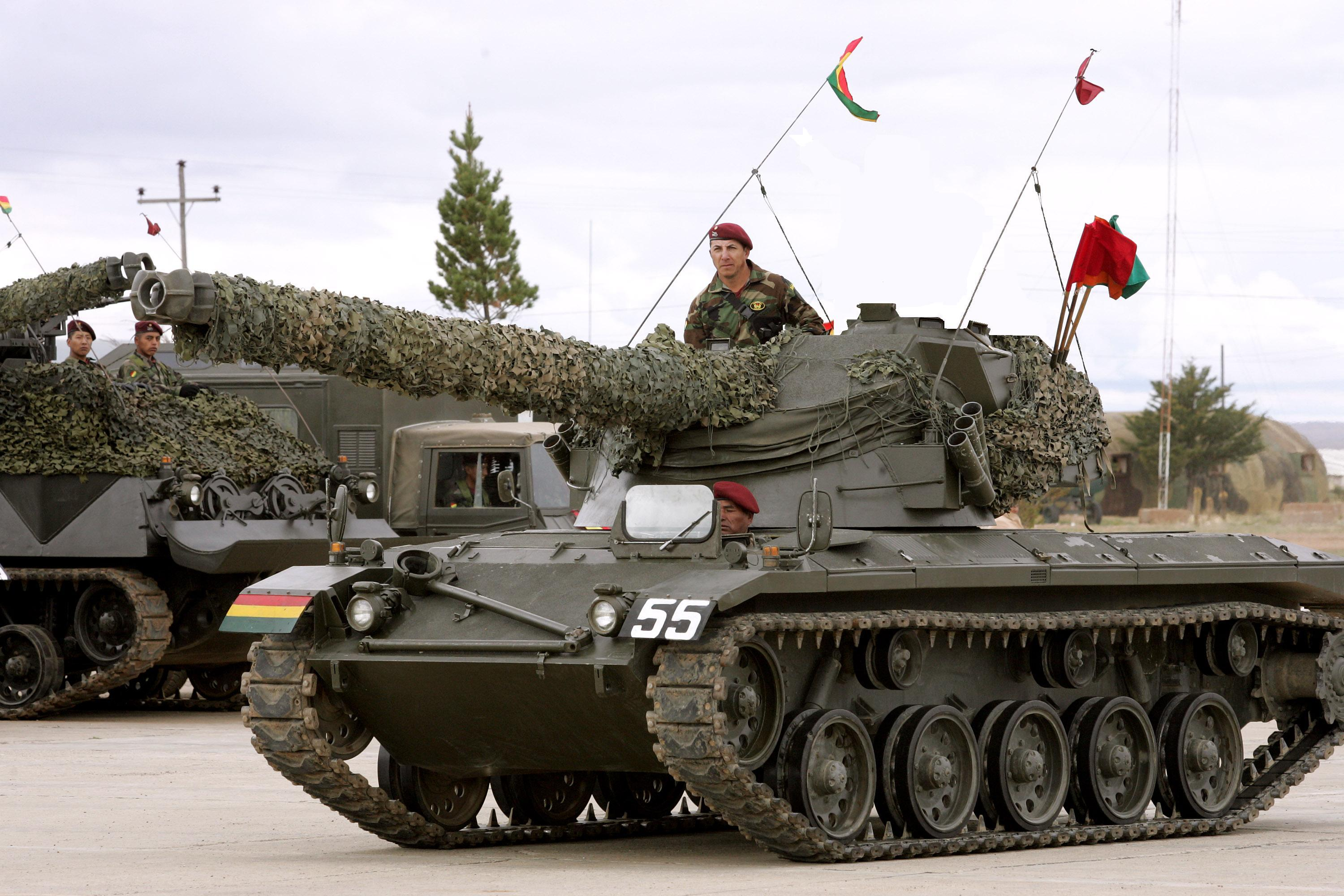
SK-105 Kürassier 19 ton light tank of the Bolivian Army with 105mm gun in oscillating turret, 2007

There are three primary advantages: higher placement of the gun in the turret, smaller turret size, and ease of fitting an autoloader.

In a conventional design, the clearance between the breech of the gun and the ceiling inside the turret determines how far the gun can be depressed. In an oscillating design, the gun and the upper part of the turret move as a unit, so no extra room is needed. The gun can therefore be mounted at the top of the turret, which may allow the turret to be smaller and lighter. The design may also increase the maximum angle of depression.

Additionally, in a conventional design elevating the barrel of the gun pivots the breech into the tank hull, which requires the turret ring to be large enough to allow this. In an oscillating design, the breech may remain above the turret ring, in which case the ring can be smaller, potentially allowing the hull to be smaller as well.

Note, however, that the maximum gun elevation angle with an oscillating turret is determined by the clearance between the rear of the turret and the deck of the hull. This may result in lower maximum elevation and range than that possible in a conventional design. For this reason, oscillating designs often have the gun mounted higher above the deck. An oscillating turret's overall height is likely to be similar to that of a conventional design, but with the gun mounted higher within the turret. The lower hull position relative to the gun may allow better protection in the hull-down position.

Another advantage is that, since the breech is fixed relative to the upper turret, it may be easier to fit an autoloader. Doing so would enable decreasing the vehicle's crew by one and decreasing the volume of the turret.

One disadvantage of the oscillating turret design is that the turret and its armor is split into two pieces. This is necessarily weaker than a one-piece design, and so is less optimal for main battle tanks and other large armored vehicles. On top of that the gap between upper and lower parts of the turret is rather hard to seal which results in problem with protection from elements, fording and making the vehicle NBC proof.

=== Compact turrets ===
==== Heavy tanks and the AMX-50 ====
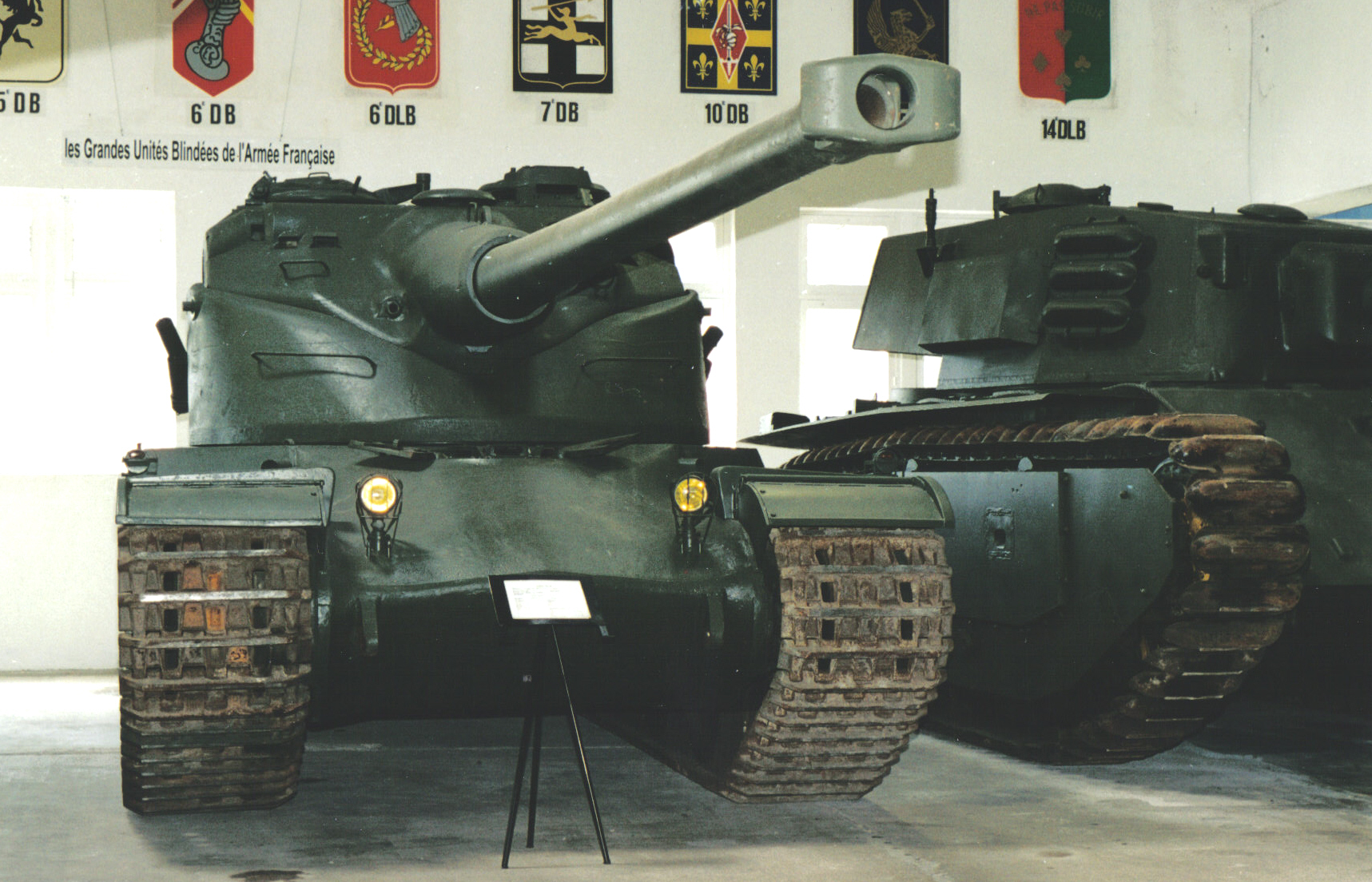
AMX-50 with 120 mm Tourelle D

The initial claimed advantage of oscillating turrets was that of reducing the turret size for a large main battle tank gun. In the 1950s, tanks were rapidly growing more heavily armed, larger and heavier. Western armed forces were trying to catch up with the increasingly formidable Soviet tanks, such as the T-55. Weight was the main problem, particularly where this then required extra engine power and stronger transmission. As the thickest armour is generally on the turret, reducing turret size appeared to be a worthwhile goal.

Size may be reduced because the non-elevating gun breech does not need to move up and down inside the upper turret. Working space thus does not need to be allowed for it above or below the breech, space that is normally wasted in conventional turret designs. In particular, the oscillating turret design is particularly shallow above the breech, allowing for a low turret silhouette, a considerable advantage.

This was the justification for the first oscillating turret, that of the French AMX-50 medium or heavy tank in the 50 tonnes class. This used first a 90 mm, then 100 mm, gun in an oscillating turret, primarily to save weight. The final 120 mm version first reverted to a conventional turret, but then used another oscillating design, the Tourelle D. However the need to elevate the gun still requires room for the breech to be lowered into the lower turret. This has tended to produce oscillating turret designs with a high gun axis relative to a conventional turret, even where the turret height is otherwise shallow.

One problem was that the armour of a turret is primarily in the front face of the turret and this was not made any smaller in the AMX-50 design, the turret of the 120 mm version being so tall as to be reminiscent of the WW2 Challenger, the turret being a whole foot taller than the contemporary and comparably armoured Conqueror. The AMX-50 grew progressively heavier and although it might have proved a capable heavy tank by 1950s standards, this whole class of slow-moving AFV was becoming outdated by the development of lightweight anti-tank guided missiles in the 1960s and so the project was abandoned.

==== Light tanks ====
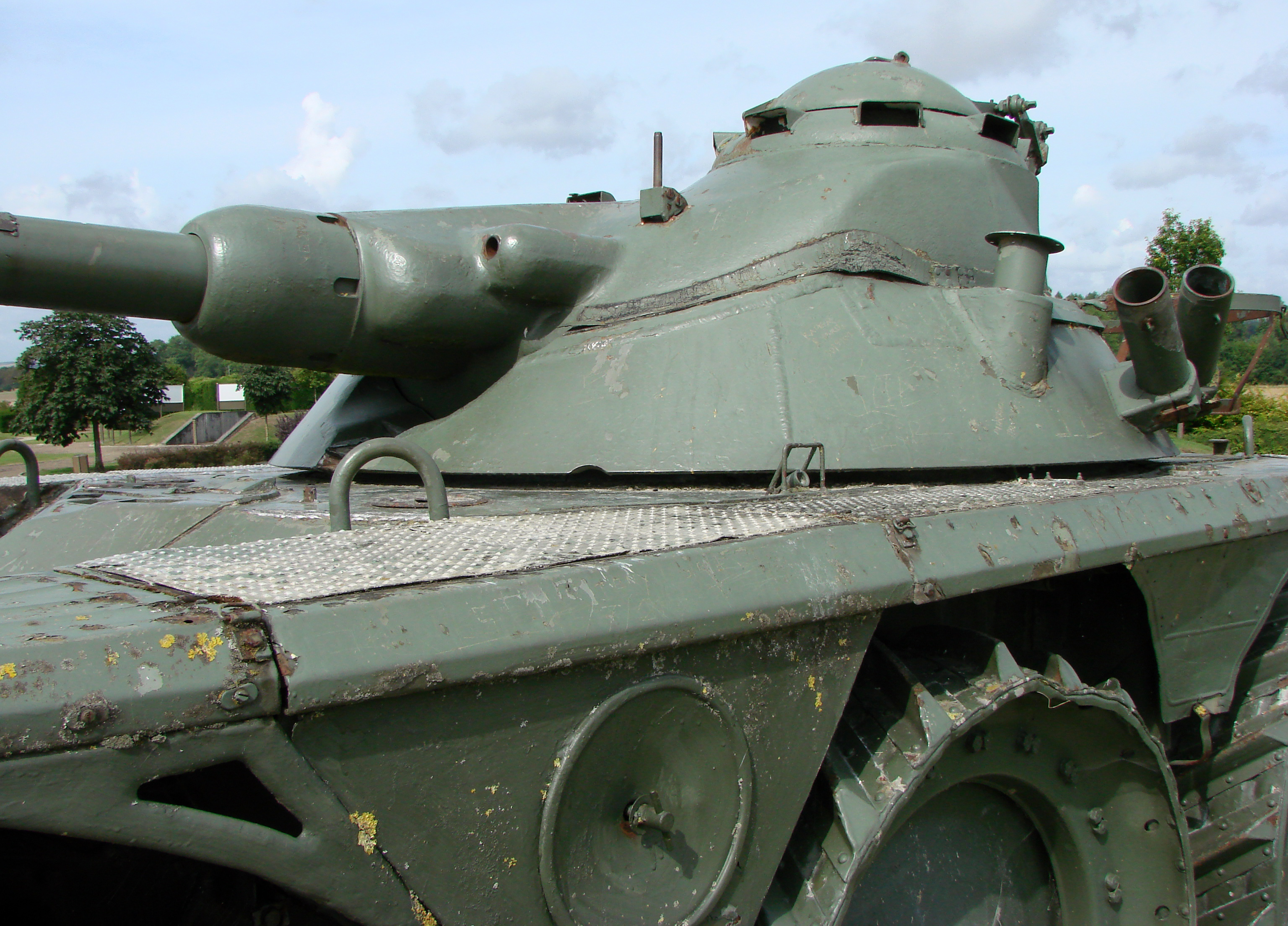
Turret of Panhard EBR

Whilst the oscillating turret was unsuccessful for the heavy tank, it proved more successful in allowing light tanks and armored cars to carry an unusually heavy main gun of 90 mm. In French doctrine, light reconnaissance vehicles were heavily armed and expected to also fulfill a role in defending the flanks of a main force. They were not expected to act as tank destroyers though, and so a high-caliber but relatively low velocity gun with high-explosive shells was effective in their role.

=== Auto-loading ===
As the gun remains fixed relative to the upper turret, it is easier to install an autoloader than for a conventional turret, where the gun must return to a fixed elevation for reloading. The French design used two six-round rotating magazines, allowing a high rate of fire and also a selection of two ammunition types. The disadvantage was that once the magazine ready capacity was used, reloading of the magazines was a slow process requiring the vehicle to rest and crew to operate outside the vehicle, which could not be carried out under fire.

As was so often the case with the early autoloaders though, their complexity was their downfall. The 120mm for the AMX-50 was simply unreliable, due to the weight of the ammunition round.

== AFVs fitted with oscillating turrets ==
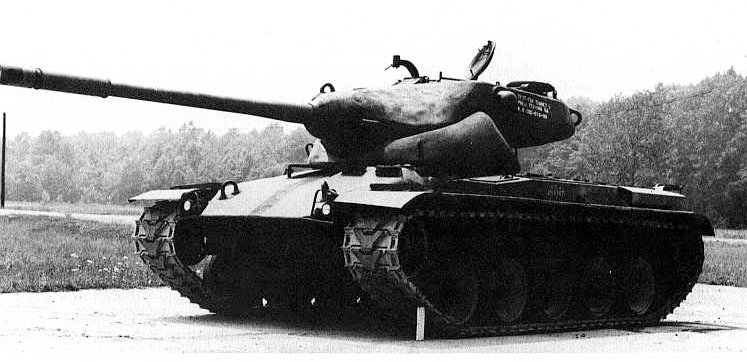
T69

French

- AMX-13 – Widely used light tank
- AMX-50 – Heavy tank, prototypes only
- Panhard AM 40 P – Armoured car, prototype only, first vehicle to mount an oscillating turret
- Panhard EBR – Armoured car

Austrian

- SK-105 Kürassier – Used the 105 mm FL-12 turret of the AMX-13

German

- Kugelblitz – Mounted dual 30mm MK 103 cannon in a novel oscillating ball mount.
- Begleitpanzer 57 AIFSV – 57 mm gun mounted in an external cradle on the turret.

Egyptian

- M4A4 with FL-10 Turret

Sweden

- Projekt Emil

United States

- T71 – One wooden prototype built
- T69
- T54E1 Tank, Heavy, 105mm Gun – Two prototype vehicles with 105 mm guns and autoloaders were constructed on the M48 tank chassis. They were constructed around 1952 by United Shoe Manufacturing. One T54 had a conventional turret, the other T54E1 an oscillating turret.
- T57 Tank, Heavy, 120mm Gun – A single prototype was constructed in the 1950s on a M103 heavy tank chassis, with a 120 mm gun in an oscillating turret.
- M1128 mobile gun system

Argentina

- Patagón – Light tank, prototypes only

South Korea

- KW 2 Jupiter

North Korea

- M1128 mobile gun system copy
