= T42 medium tank =

T42
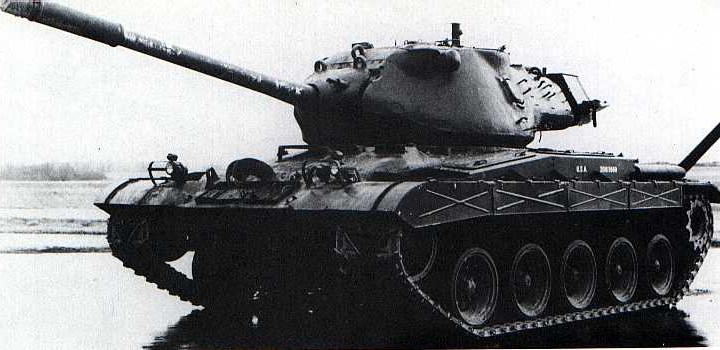
- T42 at Aberdeen Proving Ground, 1951
- Type: Medium tank
- Place of origin: United States

Production history
- Designed: 1948–1953
- No. built: 6 prototypes
- Variants: T69, T87

Specifications
- Mass: Combat loaded: 74,500 lb (33.8 t); Unstowed: 68,080 lb (30.88 t)
- Length: Gun forward: 314.7 in (7.99 m); Gun in Travel Position: 273.4 in (6.94 m); Without Gun: 232.1 in (5.90 m)
- Width: Over fenders: 140.8 in (3.58 m)
- Height: Over AA MG: 126.3 in (3.21 m)
- Crew: 4: Commander, Gunner; Driver, Loader
- Armor: Upper glacis: 102 mm (4.0 in) at 60° = 204 mm (8.0 in) LoS
- Main armament: T42: 90mm Gun T119; T69: 90mm Gun T178
- Secondary armament: Flexible AA mount: .50 cal HB M2; Coaxial: .50 cal HB M2E1
- Engine: Continental AOS-895-3; 500 gross hp 370 net hp
- Power/weight: T42: 13.4 gross hp/ton T69: 13.2 gross hp/ton
- Suspension: Torsion bar
- Operational range: 70 mi (110 km)
- Maximum speed: 32 mph (51 km/h)

The 90mm gun tank T42 was a medium tank powered by the AOS-895-3, a 6-cylinder, air cooled, opposed cylinder, supercharged engine displacing 895.9 cubic inches. It was intended to fulfill OTCM 32529's, dated December 2, 1948, call for a tank weighing 36 tons and equivalently armed as the M46 while having superior armour. With an engine producing only 500 hp, concern about the T42's performance was expressed. Testing, with a T40 loaded to the weight of T42 and powered by the AOS-895 through a CD-500 transmission, revealed it to be only equivalent in performance to the late model M4A3, which was below the design estimates.

== Development ==
The prototype vehicles were sent to testing fitted with an upgraded AOS-895-3 engine and CD-500-3 transmission. Some of the steel parts were replaced with aluminum making the T42 lighter by 500 pounds (227 kg). With the improved performance it was able to pass the original specifications but the Army Field Forces refused its adoption as still underpowered development shifted to the M47 and T48 (later M48) programs.

== Variants ==
- T69: armed with a 90mm T178 in an oscillating turret with an autoloader
- T87: proposed improvement of the T42 including features such as a cast steel elliptical hull and a flat track suspension

== Bibliography ==
- Hunnicutt, R.P. (1984). Patton: A History of the American MBT. Presidio. ISBN 0891412301.
