= Panhard AM 40 P =

- Type: Armoured Car
- Place of origin: France

Production history
- Designer: Louis Delagarde
- Designed: 1938-1940
- Manufacturer: Panhard
- Produced: 1939
- No. built: 1

Specifications
- Mass: 9.00 t (19,840 lb)
- Length: 4.34 m (14 ft 3 in)
- Width: 2.00 m (6 ft 7 in)
- Height: 1.80 m (5 ft 11 in)
- Crew: 2 (Commander/Gunner, Driver)
- Armor: 60 mm hull front
- Main armament: 1x 25mm SA 35 gun
- Secondary armament: 1x 7.5mm Reibel machine gun
- Engine: Panhard; 85 hp
- Power/weight: 9.4 hp/t
- Operational range: 100 km
- Maximum speed: 80 km/h

The Panhard AM 40 P, also known as Model 201, was a prototype French armoured car.

== History ==
In 1938, the French Army was concerned by the lack of heavily armoured vehicles in their arsenal. In the same year, the French High Command initiated a competition for a "powerful armored car" (Automitrailleuse Puissante). Panhard took part in this competition and designed the Panhard AM 40 P under the leadership of Louis Delagarde.

== Description ==
The Panhard AM 40 P was a groundbreaking armoured car for its time. The prototype had a low profile which made it harder to detect and was perfect for reconnaissance missions. It was manned by a crew of two.

It has an uncommon 8x8 wheel configuration. A pair of bulletproof pneumatic steering wheels was located in the front while another pair of bulletproof pneumatic wheels was placed at the rear axle. Two pairs of metal wheels with grousers were attached in the center of the hull to improve cross country performance. They could be raised when driving on roads.

The hull was elongated. The front upper glacis of the hull was very sloped while the front lower glacis showed a minor slope. The front of the hull had 60 mm of armour which offered the Panhard AM 40 P good protection. The driver was seated in the front and the engine was in the rear.

The commander/gunner was seated in a small turret located in the middle of the hull. The unusual turret pioneered the oscillating turret concept. It consisted of two half-cylinders inserted one into the other, while the lower cylinder was slanted obliquely, its elevated sides holding in its trunnions the upper half. Turret traverse was achieved by rotating the two half cylinders at the same time. Elevation of the gun was achieved through the vertical movement of the upper half cylinder pivoting relative to the lower side of the turret.

The main armament of the Panhard AM 40 P was the 25mm SA 35 gun. It was placed in the right side of the turret to make space for the commander in the small turret. Secondary armament was a 7.5mm Reibel machine gun.

The Panhard AM 40 P was installed with a gasoline engine that had an output of 85 hp allowing it to reach speeds of up to 80 km/h. The operational range of the Panhard AM 40 P was 100 km.

== Development ==
The prototype was completed in 1939. The outstanding characteristics of the vehicle greatly impressed the French Army. On 1 May 1940, an order for 600 Panhard AM 40 P was placed by the French Army. The Panhard AM 40 P was also planned to replace the Panhard 178. However, due to the Fall of France, no vehicle was built except the prototype. The prototype was shipped to Morocco and its fate remains unknown.

After the end of World War II, elements of the Panhard AM 40 P would be used in the design of the Panhard EBR. The oscillating turret concept pioneered by the AM 40 P was also used on the highly successful AMX-13 light tank.
