= Gun mantlet =

Armour around the main gun of an armoured vehicle

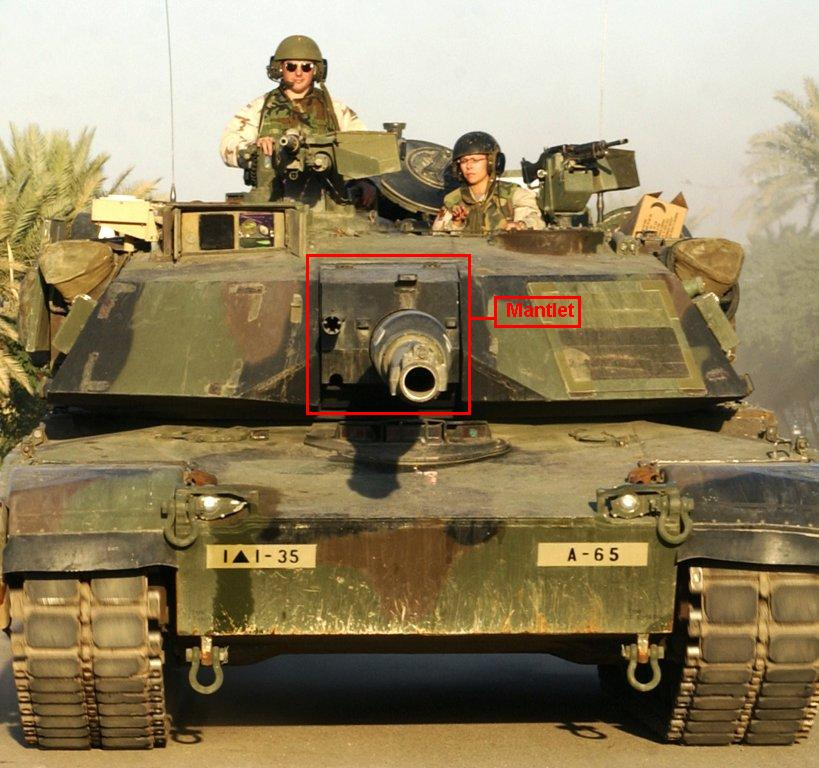
Gun mantlet, highlighted in red, on an American M1A1 Abrams

A gun mantlet is a movable section of armour fitted around the main gun of a tank or other armoured fighting vehicle. Because the gun must pivot vertically, the front of the turret requires a sizeable opening, which would otherwise leave the interior exposed to enemy fire. The mantlet closes off this gap: it moves with the elevating mass of the gun mounting (though it is not fixed to the gun tube itself), so the opening stays covered at any angle of elevation, and it reinforces the protection over the turret face.

Some modern tanks do not have a heavy armor mantlet at all. For British Chieftain, the element was dropped mostly to reduce the overall weight.

== Design ==
On many tanks of the Second World War the mantlet carried the thickest armour on the vehicle; the German Tiger I, for example, had 100 mm of armour on the hull front but 120 mm on the gun mantlet. The mantlet often also shielded the mounting of the coaxial armament and the gunner's sight apertures. It has additionally served as a mounting point for other equipment: the American M48 Patton usually carried its one-million-candlepower infrared/white-light searchlight atop the mantlet.

A mantlet may be external, standing proud of the turret face, as on most tanks of the Second World War, or internal, set behind the opening in the turret front. Internal mantlets were used on most British tanks from the 1930s onwards. They were adopted on Soviet tanks with the T-54, whose original turret, found to deflect incoming rounds downward into the turret ring, was replaced by a more hemispherical design with an internal mantlet.

In several late Cold War and post-Cold War designs, such as the M1 Abrams and Leopard 2, the mantlet was reduced in both size and thickness relative to the rest of the turret. Because the mantlet forms part of the elevating mass, heavy mantlet armour increases the load that the elevation gear and gun stabilizer must move, degrading stabilisation performance, so designers instead minimised the frontal area occupied by the mantlet.

== Shapes ==
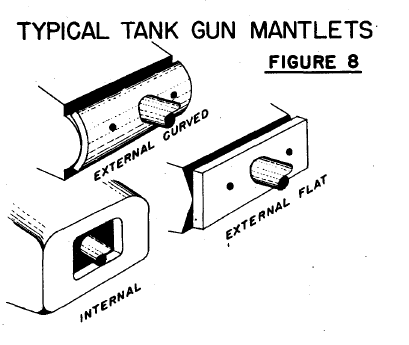
Mantlet shapes

Gun mantlets can have multiple shapes. They can be located behind the turret armor ("internal") or outside ("external") and have flat or curved shapes.

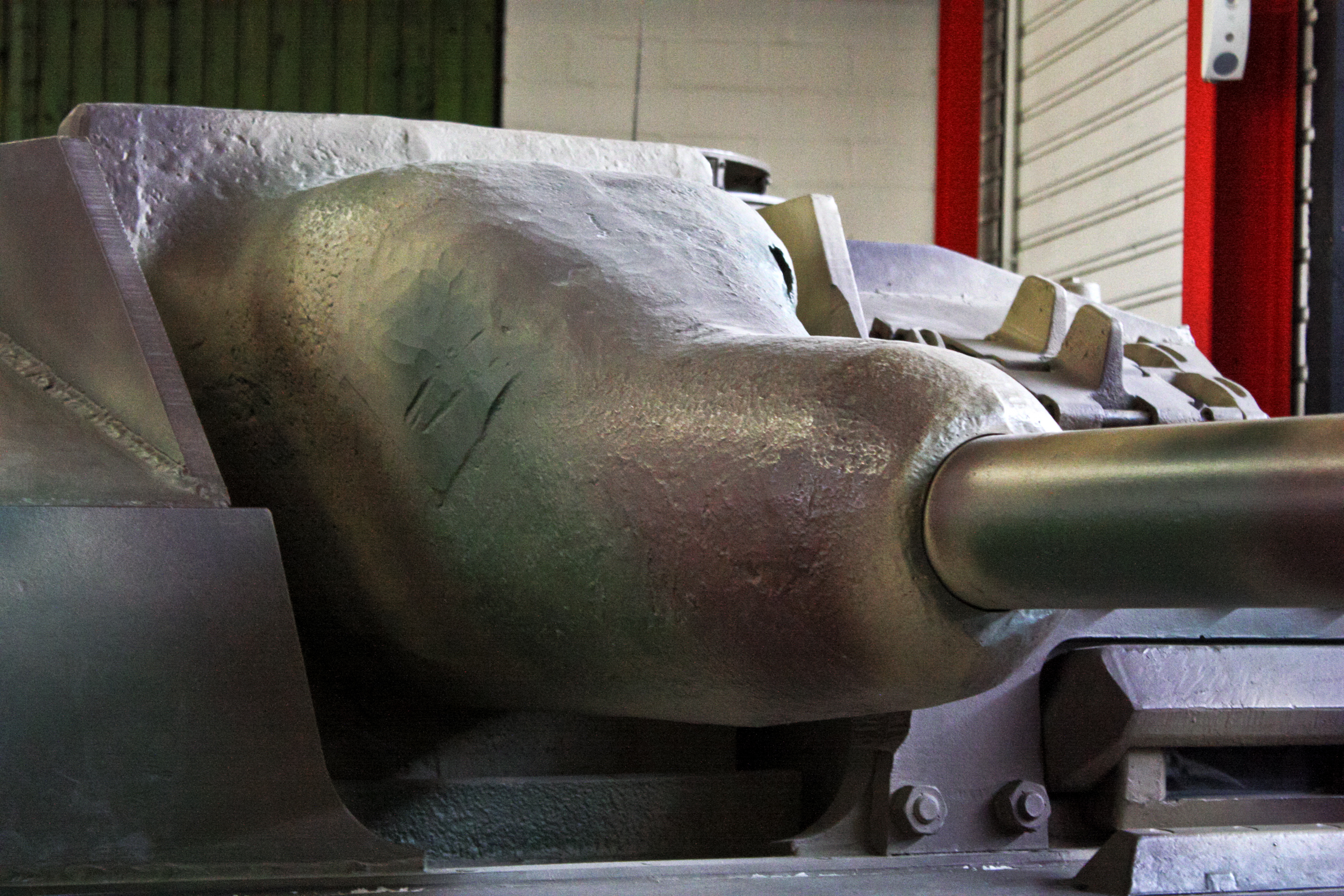
"Pig head" mantlet on Stug III

A German: Saukopf ("pig head") mantlet reduced probability of gun jamming on impact. This narrow mantlet was used, for example, on the German WWII King Tiger.

== Shot traps ==
A curved or angled mantlet can act as a shot trap: an incoming round striking its lower face may ricochet downward through the thin hull roof above the driver's compartment. The rounded mantlet of the German Panther exhibited this weakness, which was remedied on later production vehicles by adding a "chin" to the lower edge of the mantlet.

== Gallery ==
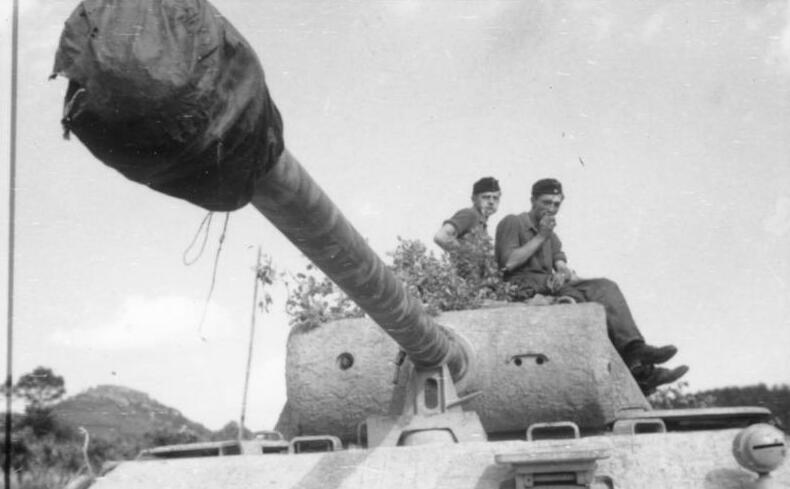
Panther tank mantlet

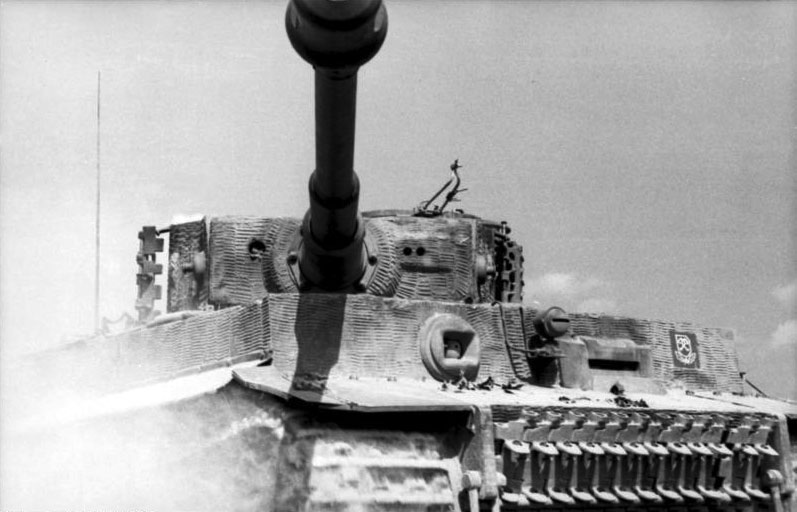
Tiger I mantlet

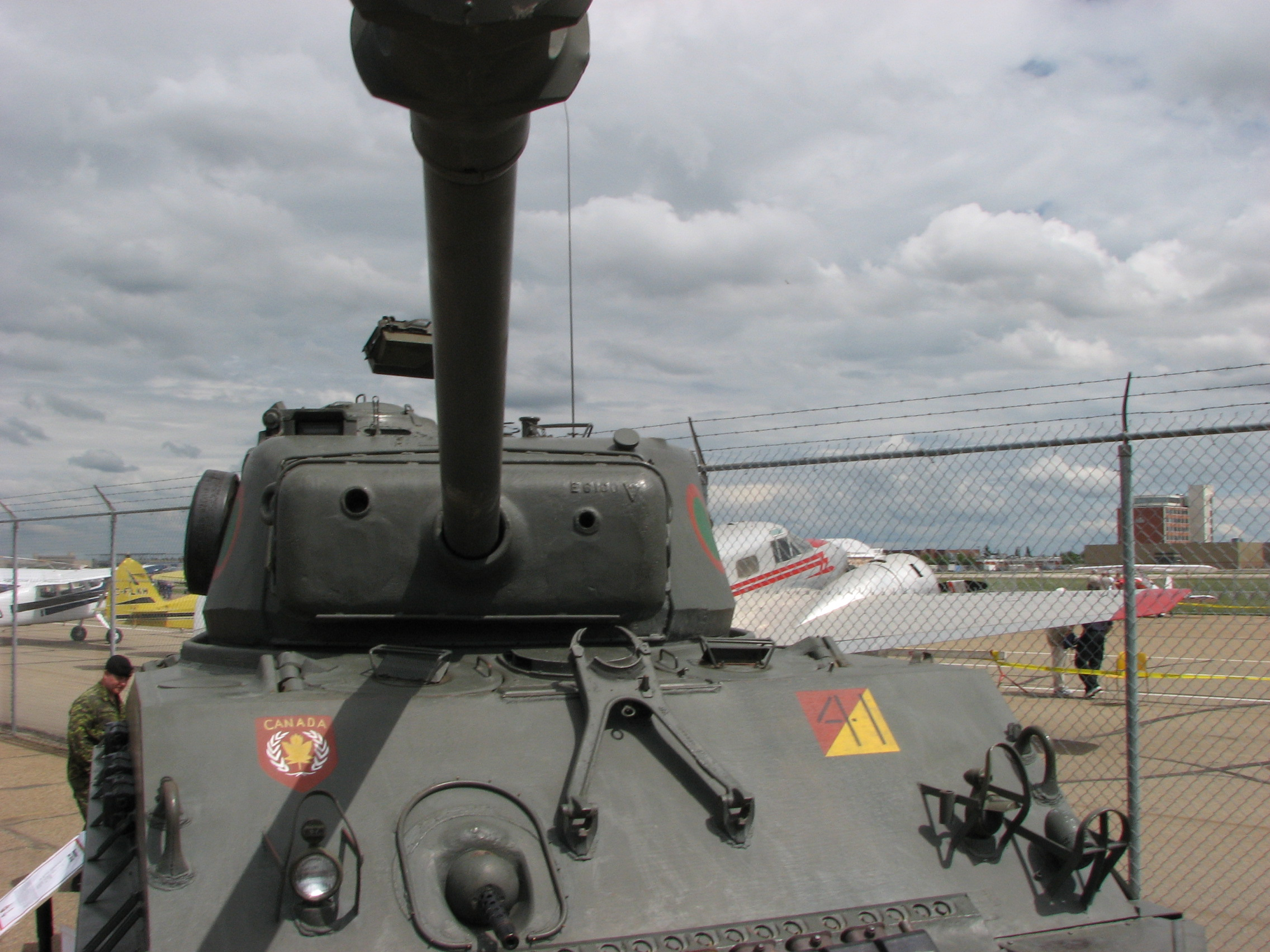
M4 Sherman mantlet

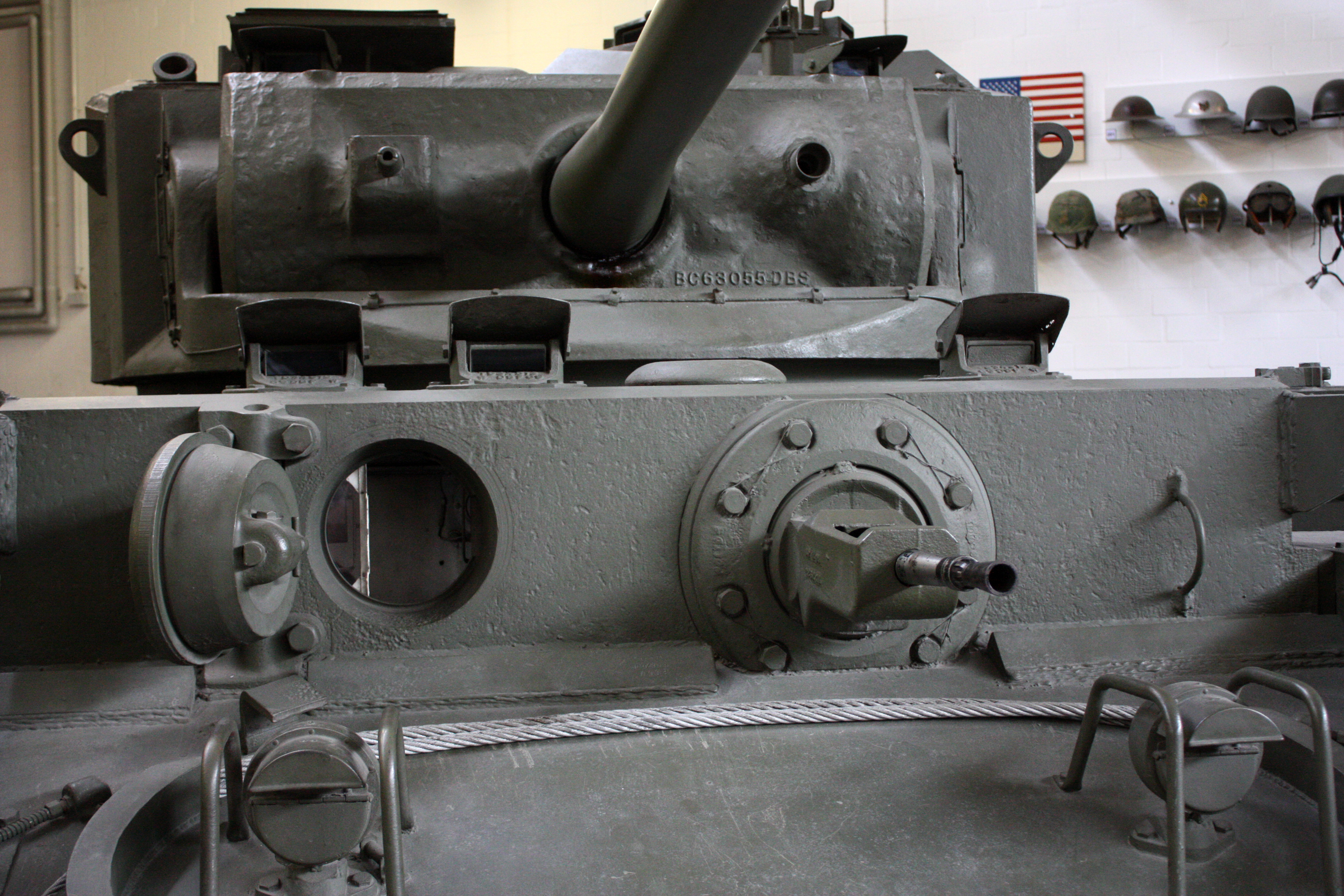
Comet tank mantlet

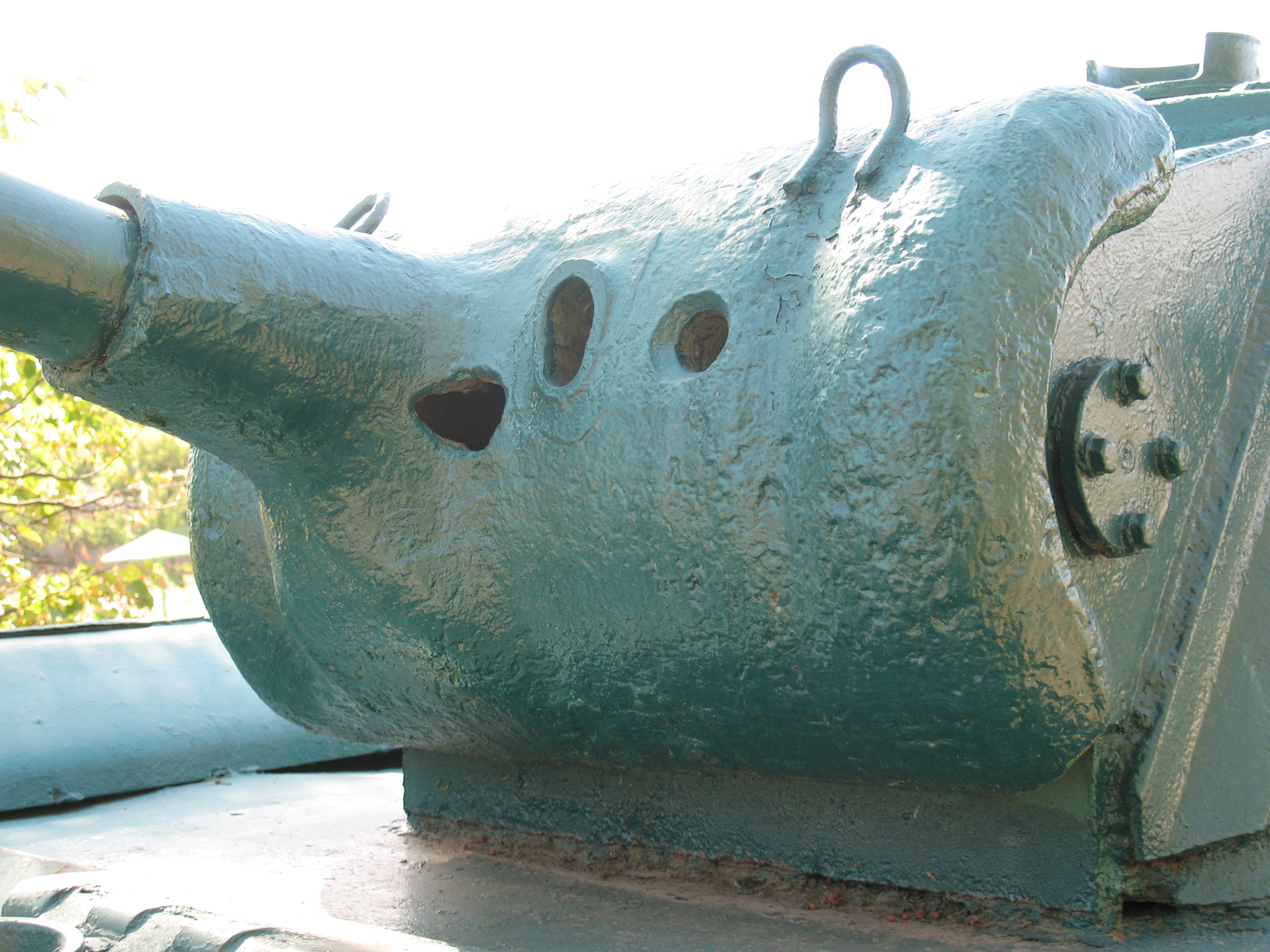
T-70 cast mantlet

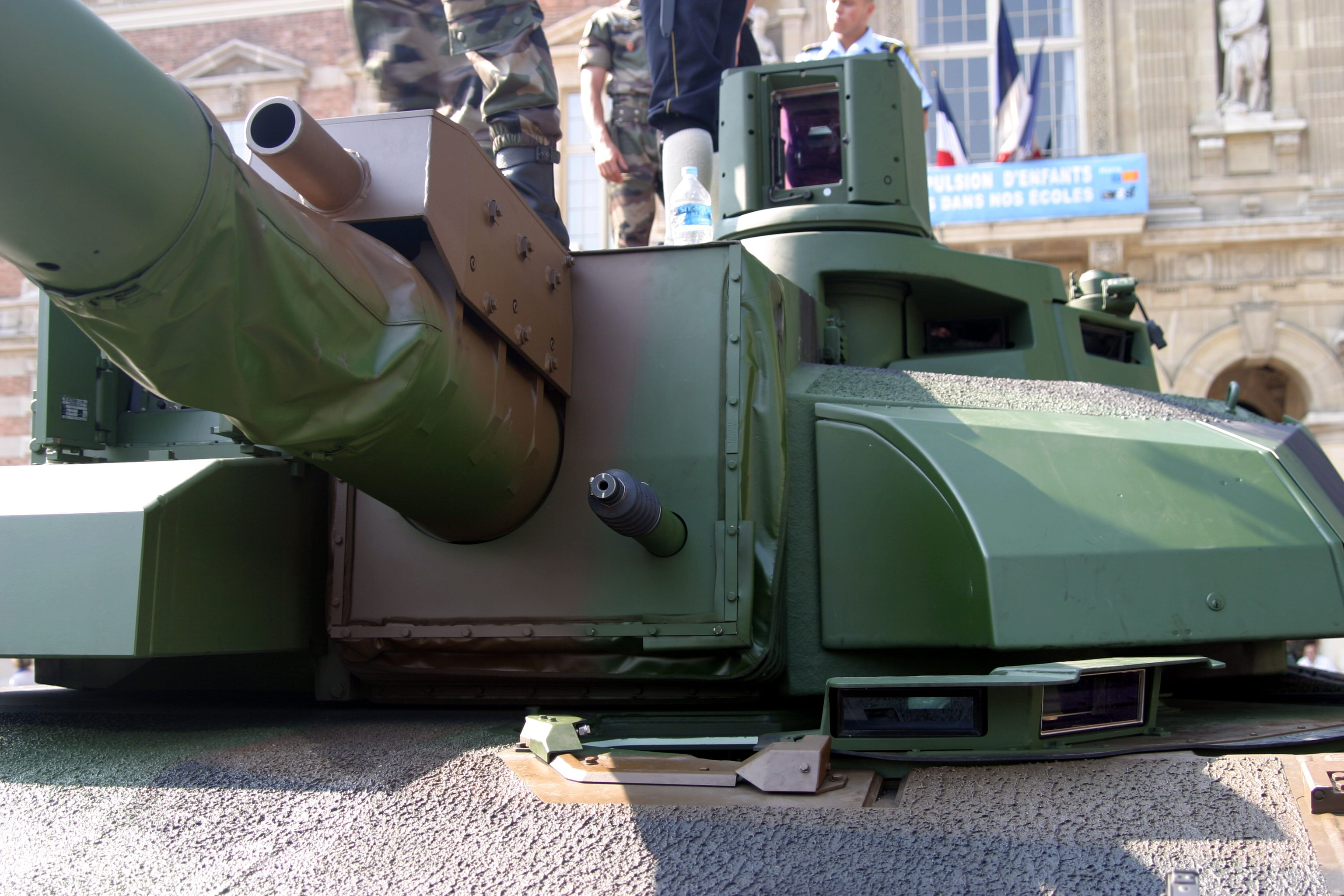
Leclerc mantlet

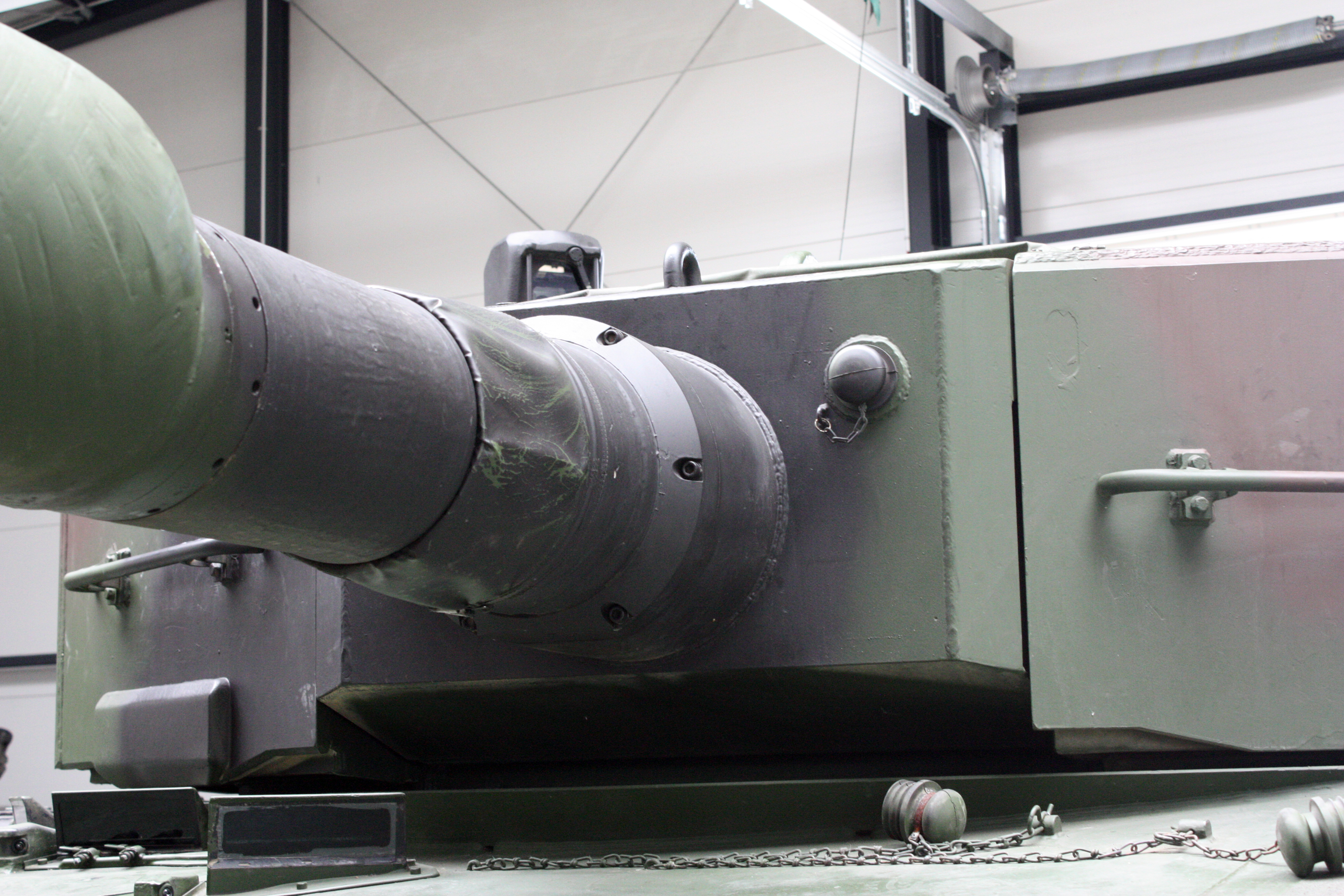
Leopard 2A4 mantlet

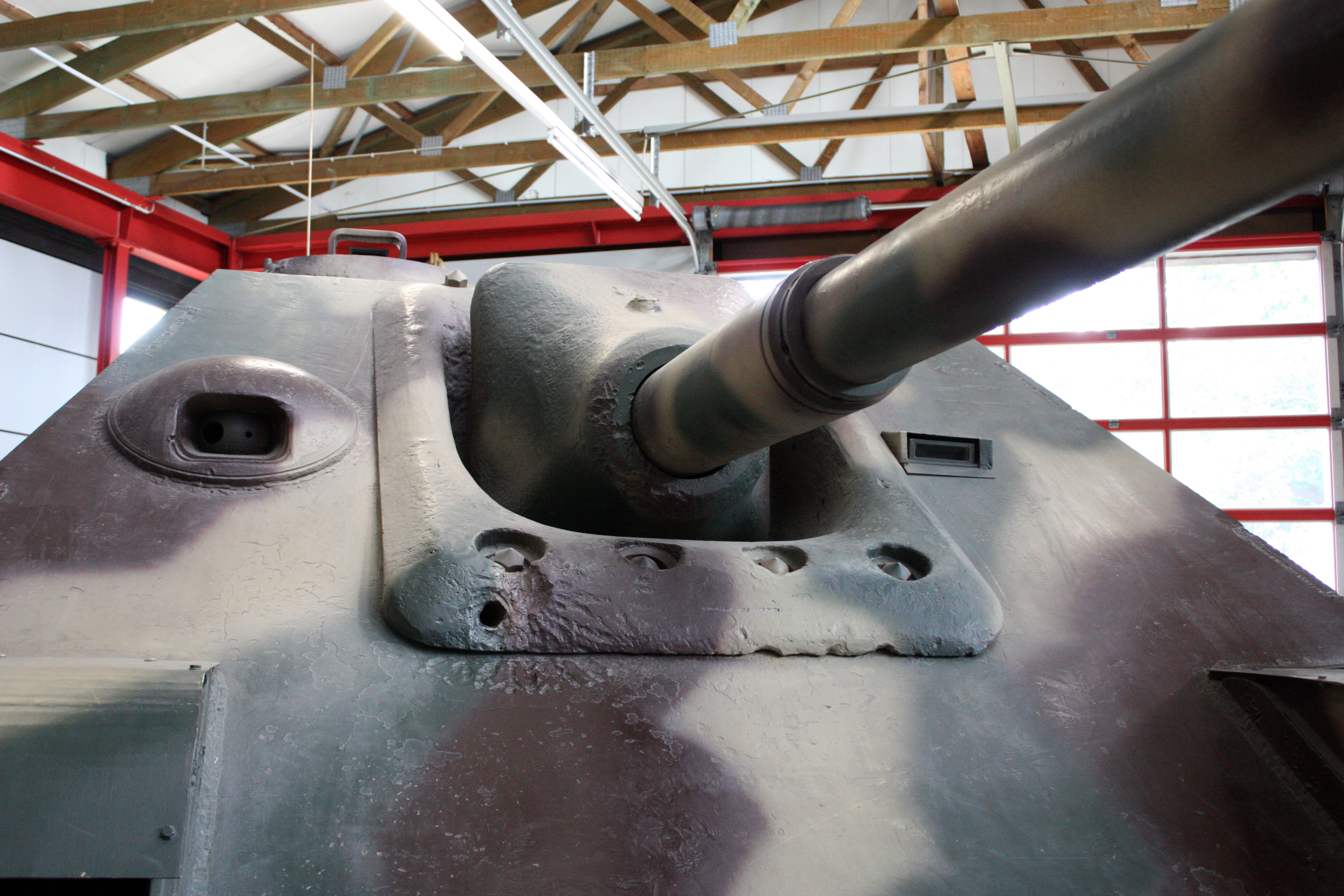
A Jagdpanther mantlet

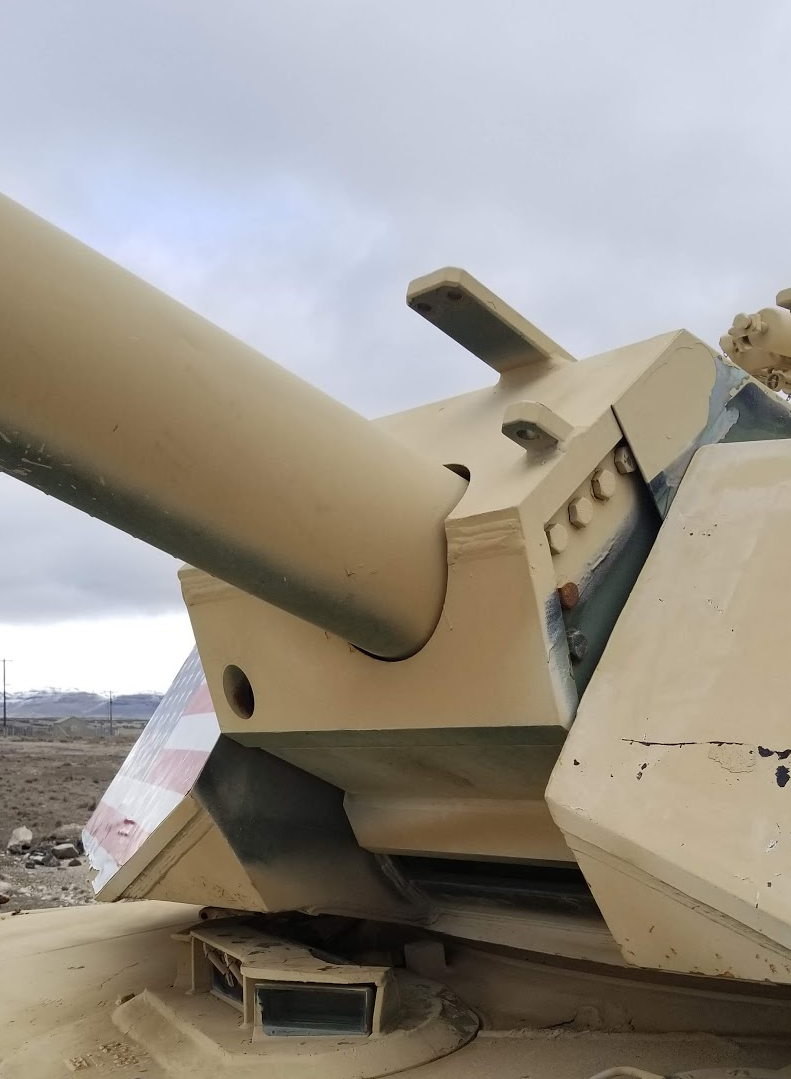
M1A1 Abrams mantlet

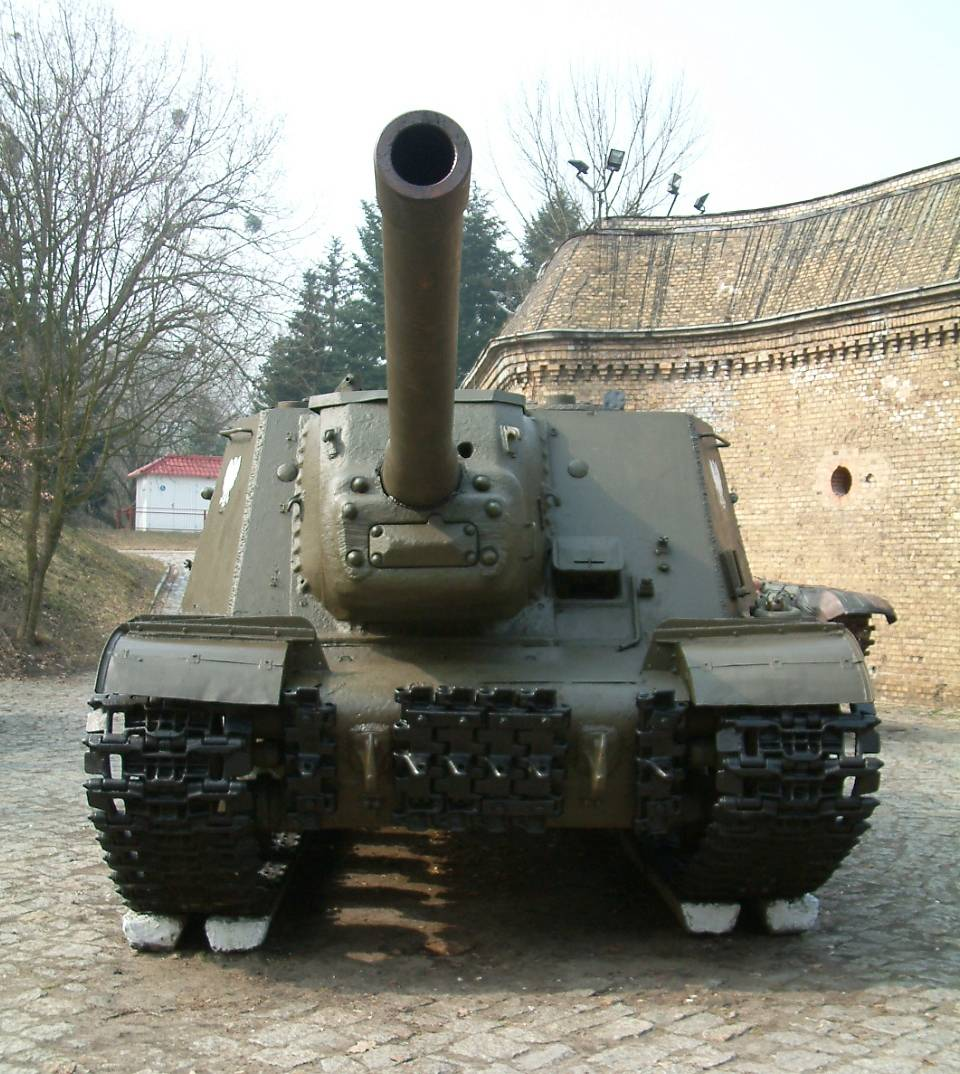
ISU-122 mantlet

== See also ==
- Gun shield
- Mantlet

== Sources ==
- Griffin, Rob (2001). Chieftain. Marlborough: Crowood Press. ISBN 9781861264381.
- Higgins, David R. (2011). King Tiger vs IS-2: Operation Solstice 1945. Duel. Vol. 37. Oxford: Osprey Publishing. ISBN 9781849084048.
- Tucker, Spencer C. (2004). Tanks: An Illustrated History of Their Impact. Bloomsbury Publishing. ISBN 9781576079966.
