= T69 tank =

T69
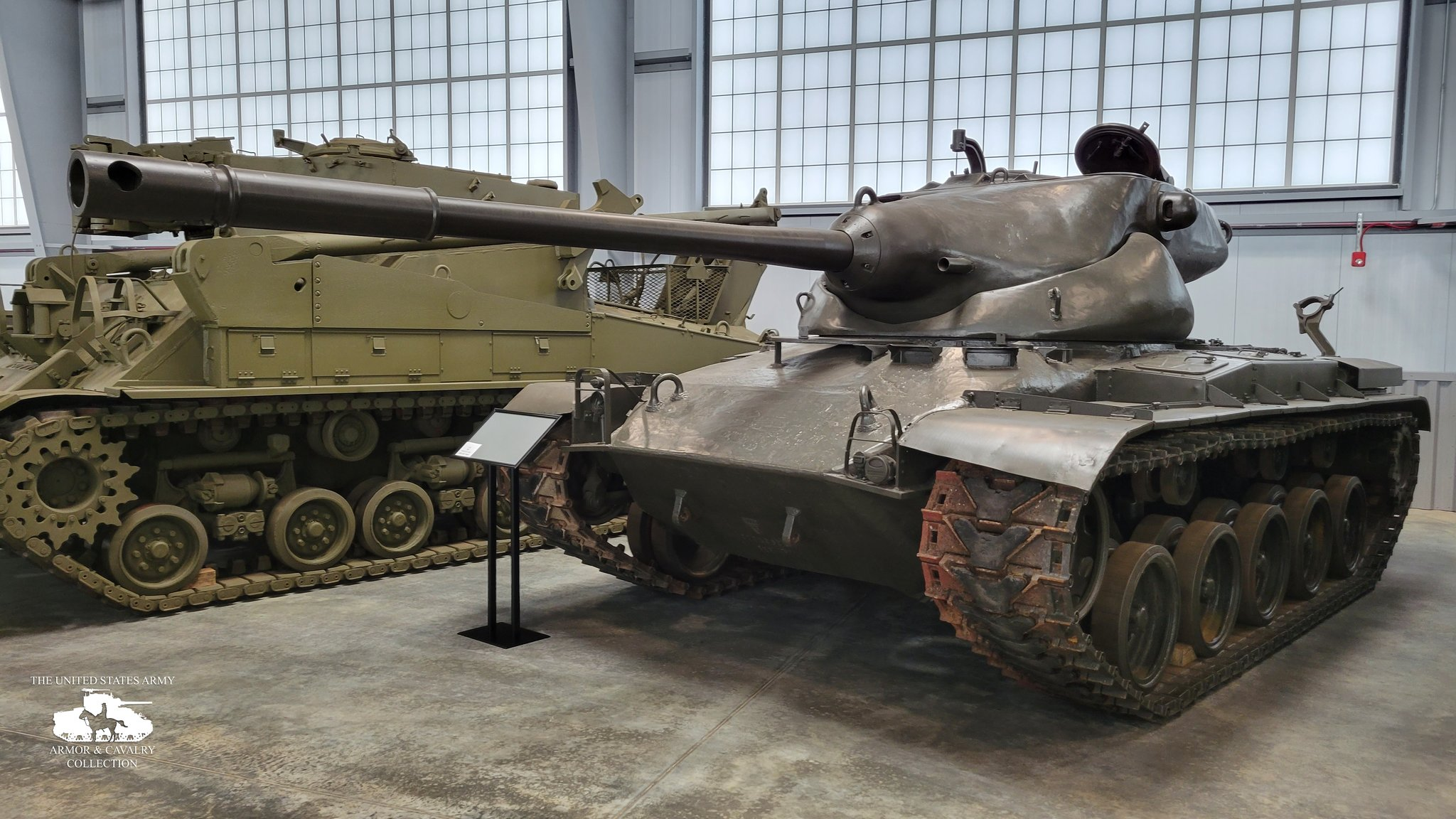
- A T69 at the U.S. Army Armor & Cavalry Collection, Fort Benning
- Type: Medium tank
- Place of origin: United States

Production history
- No. built: 1

Specifications
- Mass: 38 t (37.4 long tons; 41.9 short tons)
- Length: 8.1 m (27 ft)
- Width: 3.5 m (11 ft)
- Height: 2.8 m (9.2 ft)
- Crew: 4 (commander, driver, loader, gunner)
- Armor: 4 in (101.6 mm)
- Main armament: 90mm Tank Gun T178 (30 rounds per minute)
- Secondary armament: 1× Browning M2HB .50 Cal. (12.7 mm) Heavy Machine Gun + 1 Browning M1919 .30 Cal. (7.62 mm) Machine Gun
- Engine: Continental AOS-895-3 6-cylinder, gasoline 500 hp (370 kW)
- Power/weight: 13.15 hp (8.9 kW) /tonne
- Suspension: torsion bar, Shock absorbers
- Maximum speed: 30 mph (48 km/h) (road); 5.25 mph (8.45 km/h)(off-road)

The T69 was a prototype American medium tank with an oscillating turret mounting a 90mm cannon with an eight-round drum autoloader. It held a crew of three. Developed on the basis of the T42 experimental medium tank in the mid-50s, the vehicle never entered mass production.

== Development ==
In the early 1950s, the United States Military began a design program to develop tanks that would replace those currently in service. The M4 Sherman was becoming obsolete and was in the process of being replaced by the M26 Pershing and the upgraded M46 Patton.

These tanks, however, were still very similar to vehicles of World War II era and did not make use of newer technologies that had begun to appear. One of the tanks to spring from the design program was the Medium Tank T42. This tank would form the basis of the T69 project.

The unique feature of the T69 among other medium tanks then in development was its oscillating turret and autoloading system. The T69 project followed on from the T71 light tank project, which featured a 76mm autoloading gun in an oscillating turret. It also ran parallel to the 120mm armed T57 and the 155 mm armed T58 Heavy Tank projects, both of which also featured autoloading systems and oscillating turrets. These two were based on the hull of the M103 Heavy Tank.

=== T42 ===
The T42 medium tank was originally designed to replace the M46 Patton. The T42 was based on the T37 light tank prototype, but had increased armor protection and carried a T139 90mm gun (which would later be serialized as the 90mm Tank Gun M41) in a brand new turret. It did, however, retain the same basic dimensions and the five road-wheel running gear.

However, the T42 was still halfway through development when the Korean War started in June 1950. This gave rise to the infamous "Korean Tank Panic". As a quick solution to this problem, it was decided to take the turret of the T42 and mount it on the M46 hull. This spawned the Medium Tank M47 Patton II.

The T42 itself would never make it to full-scale production, having never met all of the Military's needs and expectations. A few of the tanks would be kept for experimentation and further development. This led to its use as the base hull for the T69.

=== T69 ===
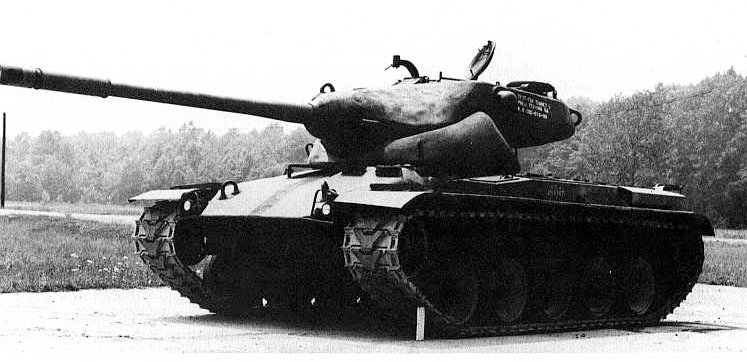
T69 at Aberdeen Proving Ground

Further studies by the Rheem Manufacturing Company found that it would be possible to pair the T139 90mm gun with an autoloader if the equipment was mounted in an oscillating turret. Oscillating turrets, made famous by the French AMX-13, were a new feature at this time. These turrets have a fixed gun in a two-part turret. The lower half, or 'collar', is connected to the turret ring and provides horizontal rotation. The upper part, or 'body', carries the gun moving up and down on a set of trunnions providing vertical traverse. Turrets of this design allowed the use of autoloader mechanisms as the gun was fixed in place, meaning the loader did not have to be re-aligned with the breach after every shot.

== Equipment ==
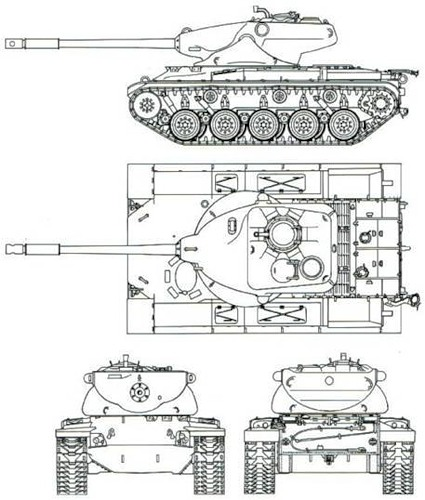
Schematic drawing of a T69 tank

=== Hull ===
The hull of the tank was made up of two parts: The front half was a long rounded casting of steel homogeneous armor, it was 4 inches (101.6 mm) thick and angled at 60 degrees, while the rear was welded steel armor plate. The two halves were welded together in the center.

==== Turret ====
The body of the turret was a single cast piece with the 90mm gun protruding from a long 'nose'. The angles of the casting provided numerous deflective surfaces against incoming rounds. This body was attached to a fully cast collar by trunnions, forming the fulcrum point of elevation and depression. The maximum elevation was 15 degrees and the maximum depression was 9 degrees. This motion was actuated by a hydraulically powered mechanism, though manual operation was possible in a case of mechanical failure. The collar was then attached to the 73-inch turret ring.

The turret crew consisted of the Gunner, Loader, and Commander. The Loader sat to the left of the gun, with the gunner on its right. The Commander was situated at the right rear of the turret underneath a rotating vision cupola.

Access into the turret either by way of the hatch on the left of the turret roof for the loader or another atop the Commander's cupola at the rear right. The traditional hatches in the turret roof were not the only point of entry, however. If needed, the entire turret roof had the ability to raise up via hydraulic systems and could rise to almost a full 90 degrees. This allowed full access to the interior of the turret, easy removal of the gun and loading system, and quick ammunition resupply. In case of emergency, it also allowed for a quick exit of the turret. This was operated by a control in the Loader's position.

Other features on the turret consist of an AA mount for a Browning M2HB .50 Cal. (12.7mm) Heavy Machine gun on the commander's cupola and a ventilator in the left rear. On each side of the turret, positioned just above the fulcrum point were the 'Frog's Eyes', the armored housings for the lenses of the stereoscopic rangefinder, as in other tanks of its day.

=== Armament ===
The T69 was armed with the T178 90mm gun. The gun was mostly the same as the T139 but was mounted upside-down. This meant that the vertically sliding breach slid up towards the turret roof instead of down towards the floor, avoiding collision with the loading mechanism. The mounting lugs were also modified so that the gun's concentric recoil mechanism could be mounted in the forward part of the turret, in the nose. There was a fume extractor towards the muzzle of the gun, just behind the muzzle brake. This was a relatively new feature on tanks at the time. Firing an AP (Armor Piercing) shell, the gun could penetrate 6.2 inches (157.48 mm) of armor at 1,000 yards. A coaxial Browning M1919 .30 Cal. (7.62mm) Machine Gun was mounted on the left of the main armament. When not in action, the turret would be traversed almost fully to the rear. The gun would then be placed in a travel lock mounted on the left rear of the engine deck.

==== Autoloader ====
The T178 gun was fed by an 8-round autoloader mechanism. The system was mounted longitudinally on the centerline of the turret. It consisted of a magazine with an integral ramming system. The magazine took the form of a conical 8-tube revolving cylinder, like a scaled-up version of something found on a Smith & Wesson Revolver. The chambers of the cylinder were reloaded manually by the Loader and could be loaded with up to three different types of ammunition: AP (Armor Piercing), HEAT (High-Explosive Anti-Tank) or HE (High-Explosive) shells. The gunner could select which ammunition type he needs to fire via a control panel in his position

When engaged, the cylinder was lifted into line with the breach, the hydraulic rammer then pushed the round forward into the breach. Upon withdrawal of the rammer, the cylinder indexed (rotated) forwards one chamber. The cylinder assembly then dropped back down to its stationary ready position low in the turret. Once fired, the empty shell was then passed along a chute to an ejection port in the turret bustle that automatically opened upon recoil of the gun. Once the shell was clear, the port automatically closed when the gun returns to battery (recovers from recoil). The rate of fire could be as fast as 33 rounds per minute. This was when firing just one ammunition type: when interchanging between various types, the rate of fire was reduced to 18 rounds per minute.

As well as the eight rounds in the cylinder, 32 rounds were held in the bow to the right of the driver. In the T42, this rack held 36 rounds. It was found, however, there was little clearance between the autoloading assembly and the turret ring for the loader to have access to this row of four extra rounds. It was the responsibility of the Loader to replenish the Cylinder when all rounds were spent.

== Fate ==
The T69 was tested at Aberdeen Proving Grounds from June 1955 to April 1956. The tests were dogged by a high rate of component failure which prevented in-depth study of the automatic loading system and operation of the oscillating turret. The tank was deemed unsatisfactory for service, but various tests on the vehicle would continue. Lessons learned would pave the way for future technologies and developments. The T69 Project was finally officially terminated February 11, 1958. The one prototype produced is now preserved in the U.S. Army Armor & Cavalry Collection, Fort Benning, Georgia.

The T69 was not the last experiment with oscillating turrets and autoloaders by the US Military. The project would be followed by the T54. They were intended as a means to develop a turret for the M48 that could carry the 105mm Tank Gun T140. A variant of this project, the T54E1, carried the gun in an oscillating turret and used an autoloading system.

== See also ==
- T57 heavy tank, an American heavy tank with an oscillating turret
