= Shot trap =

Tank armor deficiency

A shot trap is a deficiency in an armored vehicle's design. It is a location where a shell that fails to penetrate may ricochet in such a manner as to "trap" the round, guiding it to weak spots or imperfections. A trap usually forces rounds towards the hull roof or turret ring.

== Examples ==
The initial turret designs of the Panther, Tiger II, M26 Pershing and KV-1 tanks had shot traps. In these examples, the lower edge of the curved mantlet deflected incoming shots downwards. This does not always create shot traps, as the curved Russian turret designs such as the T-34 and T-44 had a similar shape, but their lower turrets were instead penetrated directly.

== Prevention ==
In an attempt to minimize the shot trap potential, some late production Panther Gs and the M26 Pershing T26E5 prototype modified the lower edge of the mantlet. The final Tiger II production turret did not feature the curved front of the early turret, instead using a flat design sloped back 10 degrees.

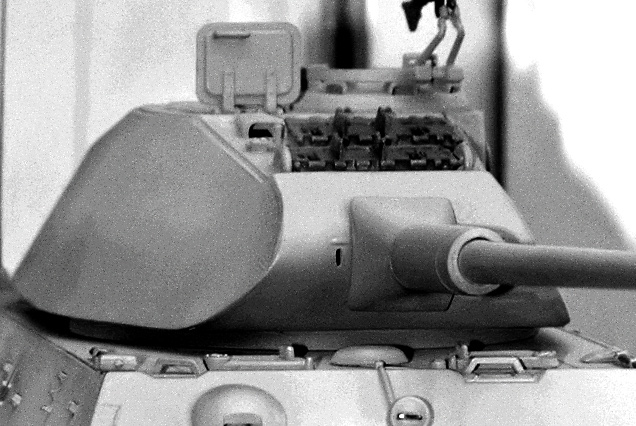
A model depicting the curved front of the early Tiger II turret

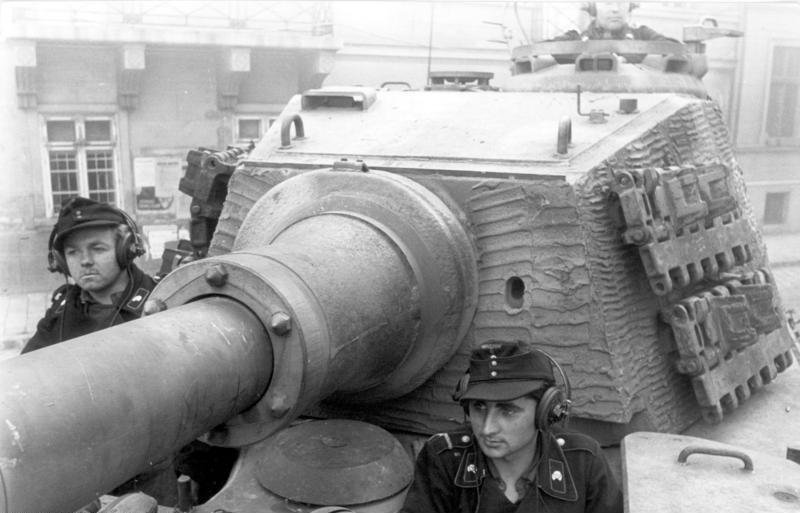
The flat front of the later Tiger II production turret
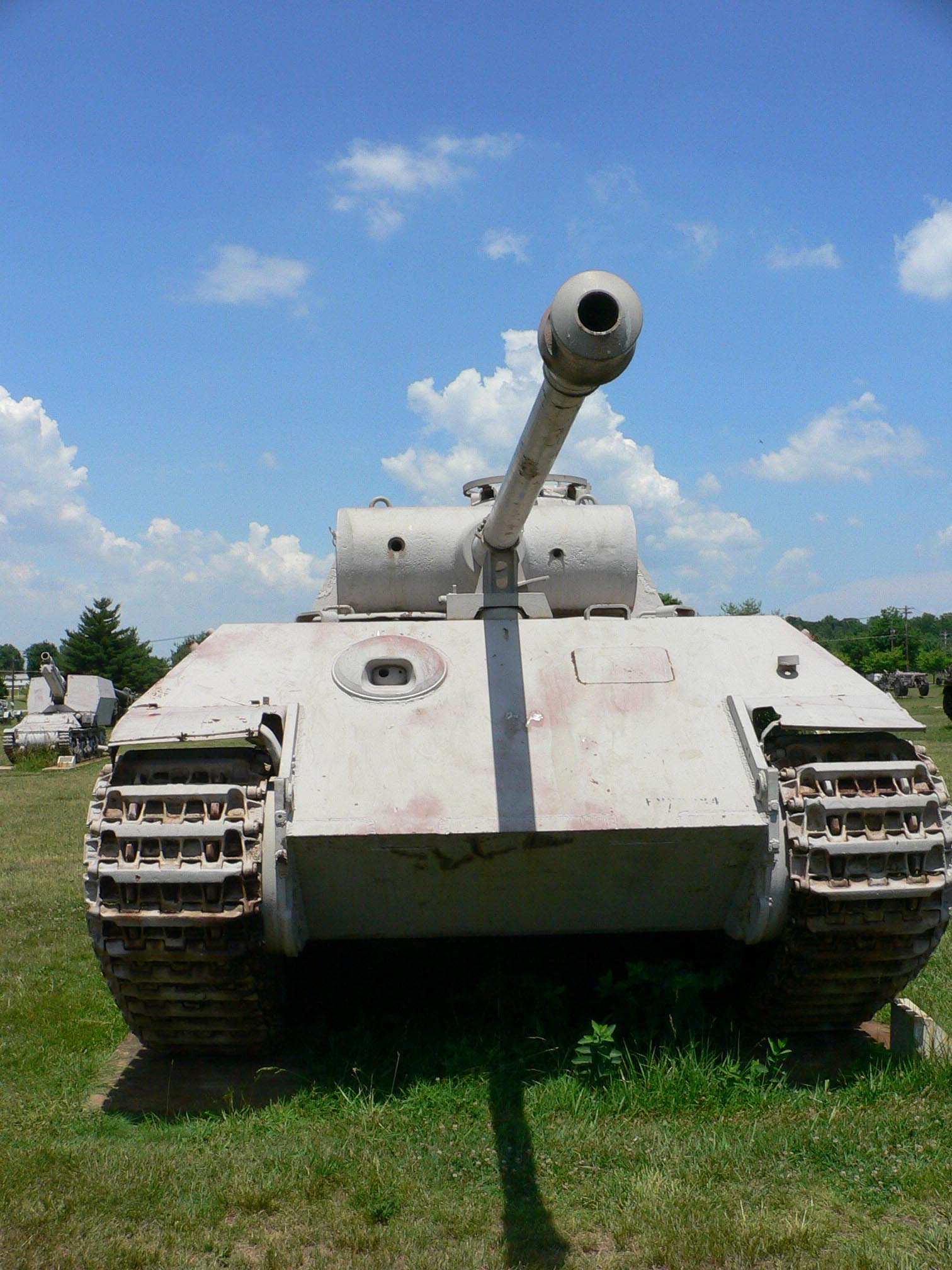
Panther with regular rounded mantlet

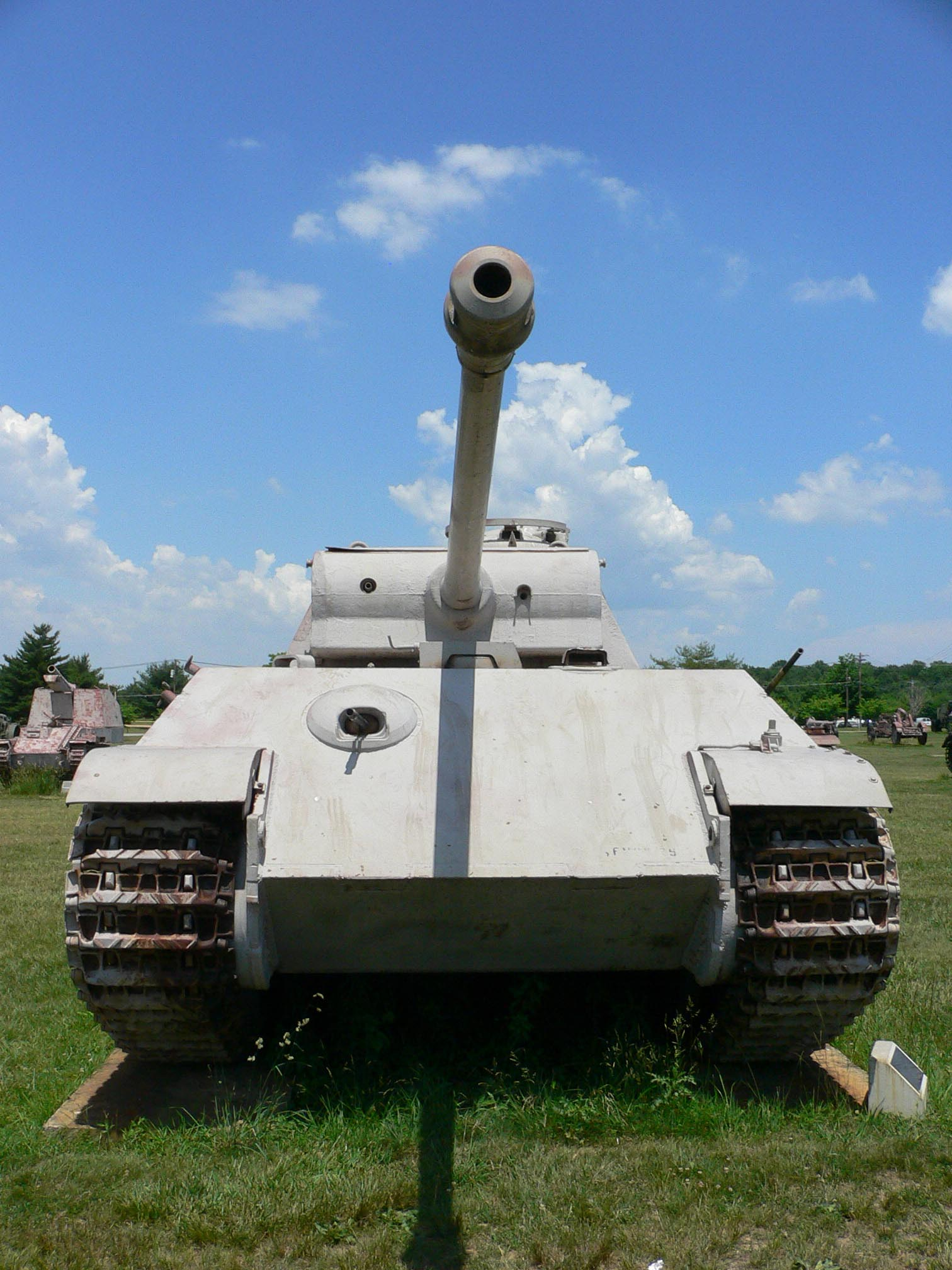
Panther with flattened lower 'chin' mantlet
