= T71 light tank =

T71, T71E1 Experimental Airborne Light Tank
- Type: Light tank
- Place of origin: United States

Service history
- In service: Unaccepted prototype

Production history
- Designer: Aircraft Armaments; Cadillac; Detroit Arsenal
- Designed: 1953
- Manufacturer: Prototype
- Unit cost: Classified
- No. built: 0

Specifications
- Mass: 17.91 t (17.63 long tons)
- Crew: 3 crew: (Commander/loader/radio operator/gunner, driver/radio operator, gunner/loader)
- Armor: 25–19 mm (0.98–0.75 in)
- Main armament: 76 mm gun M1A2 or 76 mm gun T185 (close relative of the M32 gun on the M41 tank)
- Secondary armament: 1 x GPMG
- Engine: Continental AOI-628-1/2; 340/400 hp
- Power/weight: 18.98 or 22.33 hp/tonne
- Suspension: hydropneumatic
- Fuel capacity: 150 US gal (570 L)
- Maximum speed: 64.4 km/h (40.0 mph)

The T71 Experimental Airborne Light Tank was part of a 1952 plan by the US to replace the M41 Walker Bulldog in service. It was equipped with a primary oscillating turret. It was similar to the AMX-13 and the T92 Light Tank. By 1953, there were 3 designs that were suggested as a replacement. Those 3 designs were drawn by Detroit Arsenal, Cadillac, and Aircraft Armaments.

== History ==
In 1952, the Army Ordnance Committee gave general required characteristics for a replacement of the M41 Walker Bulldog. Originally, there was a 20 ton maximum weight and a requirement for a 90 mm gun. This requirement was later changed to an 18-ton weight limit and a 76 millimeter gun which would have allowed a quicker replacement of the barrel.

== Design ==
It had an oscillating turret and a second turret mounted on the previous turret; the first turret had the primary armament of a 76mm M1A2 or a 76mm T185; the second "mini turret" had a secondary armament of an American GPMG. Separated suspension wheels made it easier to cross difficult terrain. It was proposed to serve as an armed reconnaissance vehicle, only aided in its endeavours by the tank's light weight and therefore faster speeds.

== Main armament ==
The T71 had a choice between two guns, the 76mm M1A2 or a 76mm T185. Both guns used an auto-loading system, which benefit from light-weighted, low-profile, higher rate of fire, and fewer crew members. However, that meant that the commander and the gunner would have had to manually load the magazine after expending the shells in the magazine, leaving the vehicle very vulnerable while reloading. The relatively small caliber of the gun also was rather ineffective against thick armor, such as the Russian heavy tank series "IS".

	T71
Length	271.0 in (6.9 m)
Width	109.75 in (2.8 m)
Height	98.75 in (2.5 m) (over cupola)
Ground clearance	17.5 in (44.5 cm)
Top speed	35 mph (56 km/h)
Fording	48 in (1.2 m)
Max grade	60 percent
Max trench	6 ft (1.8 m)
Max wall	36 in (0.9 m)
Range	165 mi (266 km)
Power	340 hp (250 kW) at 3200 rpm
Power-to-weight ratio	18.2 hp/ST (15.0 kW/t))
Torque	587 lb⋅ft (800 N⋅m) at 2500 rpm
Weight, combat loaded	3,740 lb (1,700 kg)
Ground pressure	11.7 psi (81 kPa)
Main armament	T185E1 76 mm
Elevation	+20° / -10°
Traverse rate	15 seconds/360°
Main gun ammo	60 rounds
Firing rate	12 rounds per minute

== Sources ==
- Hunnicutt, Richard Pearce (1995). Sheridan: A History of the American Light Tank Volume 2. Presidio Press. ISBN 978-1-62654-154-2.
