= Batignolles Chatillon 155 mm =

Batignolles-Châtillon 155mm
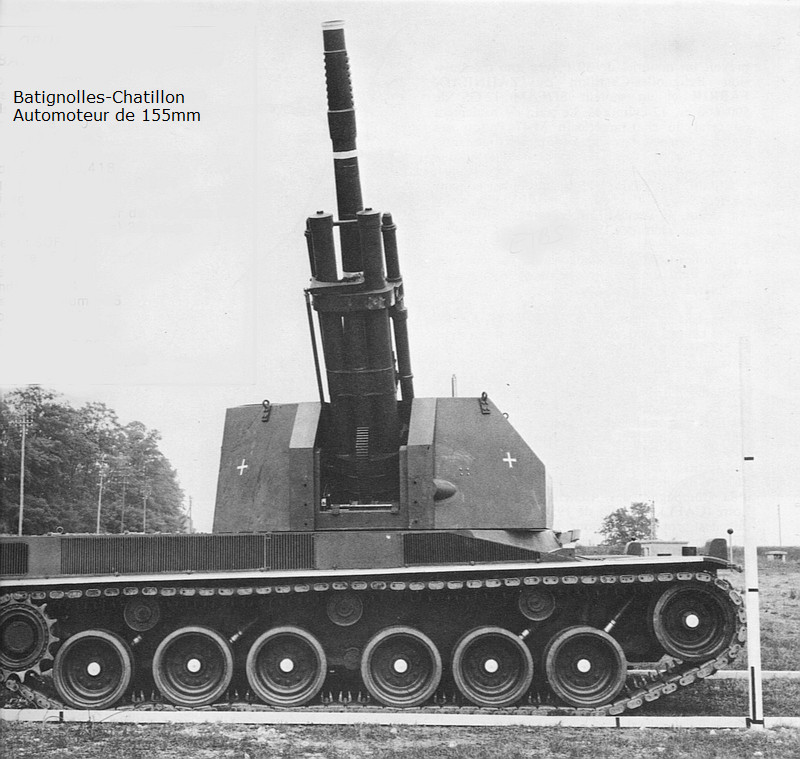
- Automoteur Batignolles-Châtillon 155mm with turret facing hull right with gun at full elevation
- Type: Self-propelled artillery
- Place of origin: France

Specifications
- Mass: 34.33 metric tonnes
- Length: 8.20 m (26 ft 11 in)
- Width: 3.28 m (10 ft 9 in)
- Height: 3.23 m (10 ft 7 in)
- Crew: 6
- Main armament: 155 mm gun
- Suspension: torsion bar
- Maximum speed: 62 km/h (39 mph)

The Batignolles-Châtillon 155 mm is a self-propelled artillery developed in France by the Batignolles-Châtillon company in the post-war years.

== History ==
The Batignolles-Châtillon 155 mm self-propelled artillery project was started after the cancellation of the Lorraine 155 mm project.

=== Turret ===
The Batignolles-Châtillon 155 mm had a turret installed for rotation of the gun. This make the vehicle unique as other contemporary self-propelled artillery of that period did not have a rotating turret.

=== Armament ===
The vehicle was planned to inherit the 155 mm gun from the Lorraine 155 mm. It was also designed to equip an autoloader. The vehicle can carry a maximum of 36 shells.

=== Chassis ===
The chassis of the vehicle is based on the Batignolles-Châtillon Char 25T with improved suspension. the track was taken from the M47 patton along with the sprockets

== Development ==
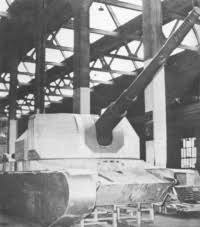
Automoteur Batignolles-Châtillon 155mm wooden mockup with mock gun raised

The prototype was built in 1955. The program was abandoned in December 1959 with only one prototype, and a wooden mockup built.
