= AMX-30 =

1966 French main battle tank

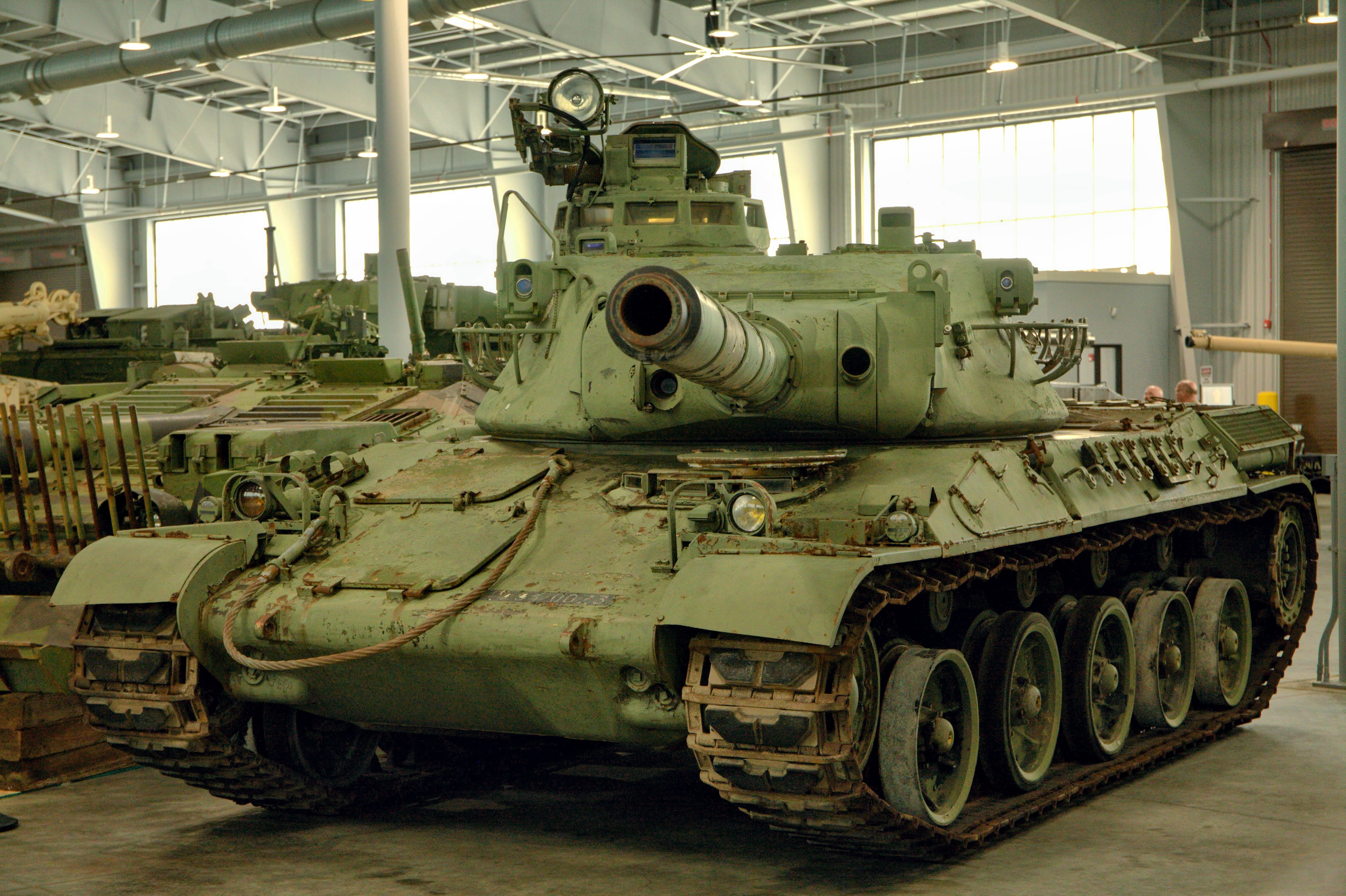
- A former French AMX-30B at the U.S. Army Armor & Cavalry Collection
- Type: Main battle tank
- Place of origin: France

Service history
- In service: since 1966
- Used by: See Operators
- Wars: Iran–Iraq War; Persian Gulf War; Saudi Arabian–Yemeni border conflict

Production history
- Designed: 1959; 67 years ago
- Manufacturer: AMX (later GIAT)
- Produced: 1966-1994
- No. built: 3,571

Specifications
- Mass: 36 tonnes (40 short tons; 35 long tons)
- Length: 9.48 m (31 ft 1 in) (gun forward)
- Width: 3.1 m (10 ft 2 in)
- Height: 2.28 m (7 ft 6 in)
- Crew: 4 (commander, gunner, loader, driver)
- Armor: 80 mm (3.1 in) maximum
- Main armament: 105 mm Modèle F1 tank gun
- Secondary armament: 1× 20 mm modèle F2 gun 1× 7.62 mm NF1 machine gun
- Engine: Hispano-Suiza HS-110 multi-fuel 680 hp (510 kW)-720 hp (540 kW)
- Power/weight: 18.9 hp/tonne
- Transmission: Manual on AMX30B; Semi-automatic SESM ENC200 on AMX-30B2
- Suspension: Torsion bar with shock absorbers
- Operational range: 600 km (370 mi)
- Maximum speed: 65 km/h (40 mph)

The AMX-30 is a French main battle tank designed by Ateliers de construction d'Issy-les-Moulineaux (AMX, then GIAT) and first delivered to the French Army in August 1966. The first five tanks were issued to the 501st Régiment de Chars de Combat (Tank Regiment) in August of that year. The production version of the AMX-30B weighed 36 metric tons (40 short tons), and sacrificed protection for increased mobility. The French believed that it would have required too much armour to protect against the latest anti-tank threats, thereby reducing the tank's maneuverability. Protection, instead, was provided by the speed and the compact dimensions of the vehicle, including a height of 2.28 metres. It had a 105 mm gun, firing a then advanced high-explosive anti-tank (HEAT) warhead known as the Obus G. The Obus G used an outer shell, separated from the main charge by ball bearings, to allow the round to be spin-stabilized by the gun without spinning the warhead inside which would disrupt jet formation. Mobility was provided by the 720 horsepower (540 kW) HS-110 diesel engine, although the troublesome transmission adversely affected the tank's performance.

In 1979, due to issues caused by the transmission, the French Army began to modernize its fleet of tanks to AMX-30B2 standards, which included a new transmission, an improved engine and the introduction of a new OFL 105 F1 fin-stabilized kinetic energy penetrator. Production of the AMX-30 also extended to a number of variants, including the AMX-30D armoured recovery vehicle, the AMX-30R anti-aircraft gun system, a bridge-layer, the Pluton tactical nuclear missile launcher and a surface-to-air missile launcher.

It was preceded by two post-war French medium tank designs. The first, the ARL 44, was an interim tank. Its replacement, the AMX 50, was cancelled in the mid-1950s in favour of adopting the M47 Patton tank. In 1956, the French government entered a cooperative development program with West Germany and Italy in an effort to design a standardized tank. Although the three nations agreed to a series of specific characteristics that the new tank should have, and both France and Germany began work on distinctive prototypes with the intent of testing them and combining the best of both, the program failed as Germany decided not to adopt the new French 105-millimetre (4.1 in) tank gun and France declared that it would postpone production until 1965. As a result, both nations decided to adopt tanks based on their own prototypes. The German tank became the Leopard 1, while the French prototype became the AMX-30.

As early as 1969, the AMX-30 and variants were ordered by Greece, soon followed by Spain (AMX-30E). In the coming years, the AMX-30 would be exported to Saudi Arabia, Venezuela, Qatar, the United Arab Emirates, Cyprus and Chile. By the end of production, 3,571 units of AMX-30s and its variants had been manufactured. Both Spain and Venezuela later began extensive modernization programs to extend the life of their vehicles and to bring their tanks up to more modern standards. In the 1991 Gulf War, AMX-30s were deployed by both the French and Qatari armies. Qatari AMX-30s saw action against Iraqi forces at the Battle of Khafji. France and most other nations had replaced their AMX-30s with more up-to-date equipment by the end of the 20th century; in French service, the AMX-30 was replaced by the Leclerc. The tank remained in service in a few countries as of 2024.

== Background ==
Although the occupation of France during World War II temporarily interrupted French development of armoured fighting vehicles, clandestine research allowed the French to quickly recover lost ground after its liberation in mid-1944. During the occupation, the French had secretly worked on an armour program that was, in 1944, taken over by the state workshop Atelier de Construction de Rueil (ARL), resulting in the design and production of the ARL 44, which began production in 1946. The tank was powered by a Maybach HL-230 575 horsepower (429 kW) engine, and armed with a 90-millimetre (3.5 in) tank gun. Although the 48-metric-ton (53-short-ton) vehicle was comparable to contemporary battle tanks in firepower and engine power, it suffered from distinct disadvantages, including an antiquated track design. While 600 were planned, only 60 were ultimately produced by 1950. That year, these were issued to the French Army's 503rd Tank Regiment. Given that the ARL 44 had been considered only a stop-gap vehicle for the French Army's armoured forces since inception, work on a new tank had begun as early as March 1945.

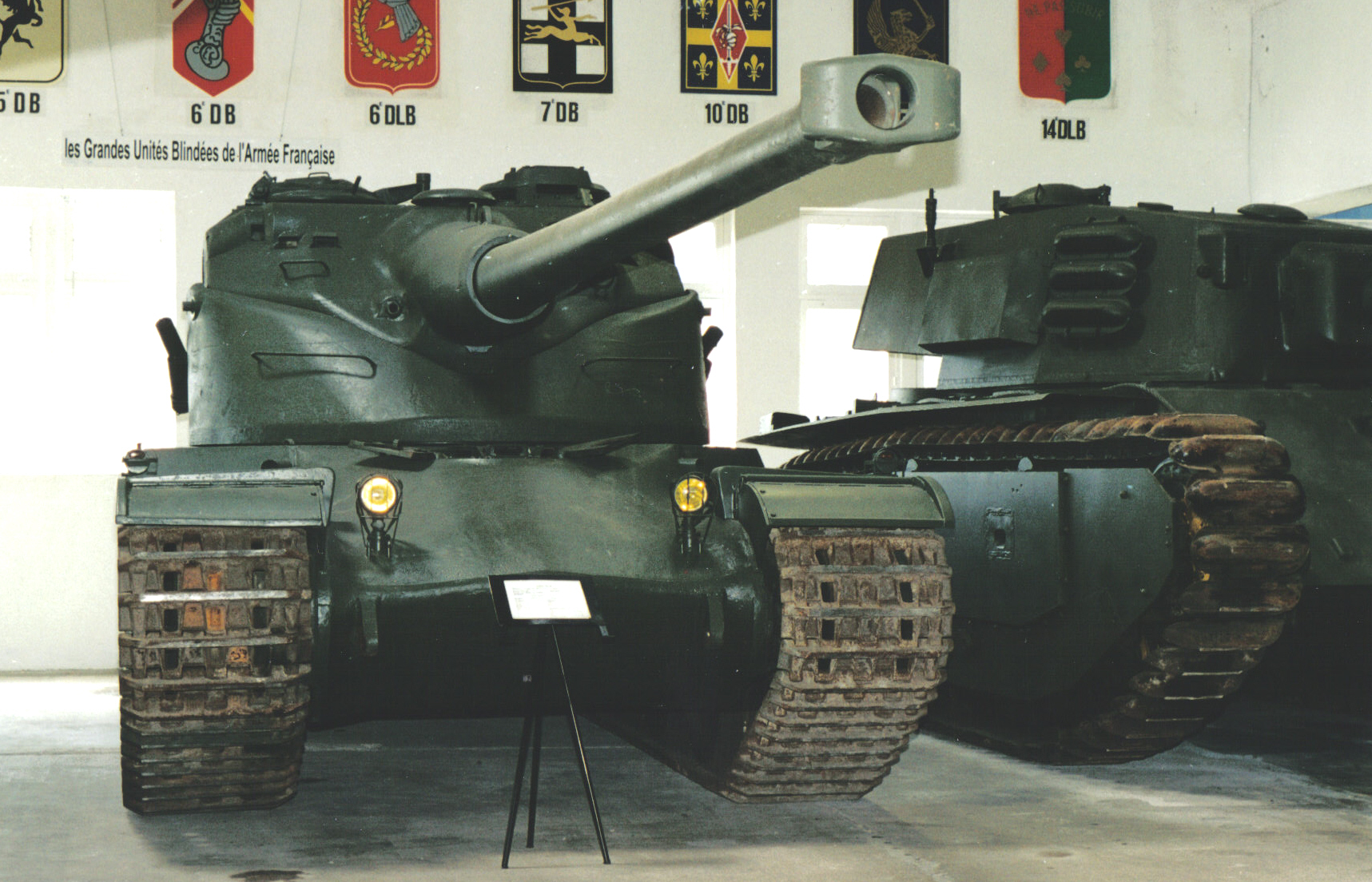
AMX 50 at the tank museum in Saumur

Development of the new tank, nicknamed char de 50 tonnes ('50-ton tank') was offered to five separate manufacturers: Atelier de Construction d'Issy-les-Moulineaux (AMX), Forges et Chantiers de la Méditerranée (FCM), Renault and Societé d'Outillage Mécanique et d'Usinage d'Artillerie (SOMUA). Manufacturer Societe Lorraine de Dietrich (SLD-Lorraine) was requested to design a lighter medium tank, resulting in char 40 tonnes prototype. The new vehicle was based on the new post-war requirement for a single battle tank. Depending on the prototype, it's hull and suspension were either similar to that of the German Panther tank, which had been used by the French Army in the immediate post-war (AMX), or the armor, crew and transmission layout had followed the Tiger II tank design (SOMUA). The French government's specifications for the new tank were strongly influenced by both the Panther tank and the heavier Tiger I; specifically, the French Army was looking for a tank with the protection of the former and the firepower of the latter. Although the design borrowed from German tanks, including the Maybach HL295 1,000 horsepower (750 kW) engine, based on an earlier HL234 model, and the torsion bar sprung road wheels, the char 50 tonnes also included a number of unique features. For example, it included an oscillating turret, mounted on trunnions, which was the first of its kind. The oscillating turret consisted of two parts, one of which was mounted on the trunnions of the lower part, attached to the turret ring. The main gun was attached to the upper part, facilitating gun elevation and depression, as well as simplifying the fire control equipment and the installation of the automatic loading system. Of the three contractors, Renault withdrew from the program, while in early 1946 the French government selected AMX and SOMUA to continue the development. The prototypes were designated M4 (designed by AMX) and SM (by SOMUA), and AMX completed its prototype in 1949, while SOMUA would not be finished until 1956 due to the delays with engine delivery. AMX's first prototype was armed with a 90-millimeter (3.5 in) cannon, although a second prototype was fitted with a larger 100-millimetre (3.9 in) gun in July 1950 Although it was intended to put the AMX 50 into production as the standard medium tank of the Western European Union, financial reasons and the arrival of military aid from the United States in the form of 856 M47 Patton tanks caused the original program to be abandoned. In 1951 it was decided to turn the program into a heavy tank project with an even larger 120-millimetre (4.7 in) tank gun; though three prototypes were built, this too was abandoned in 1956, mainly due to a failure to design a powerful enough engine.

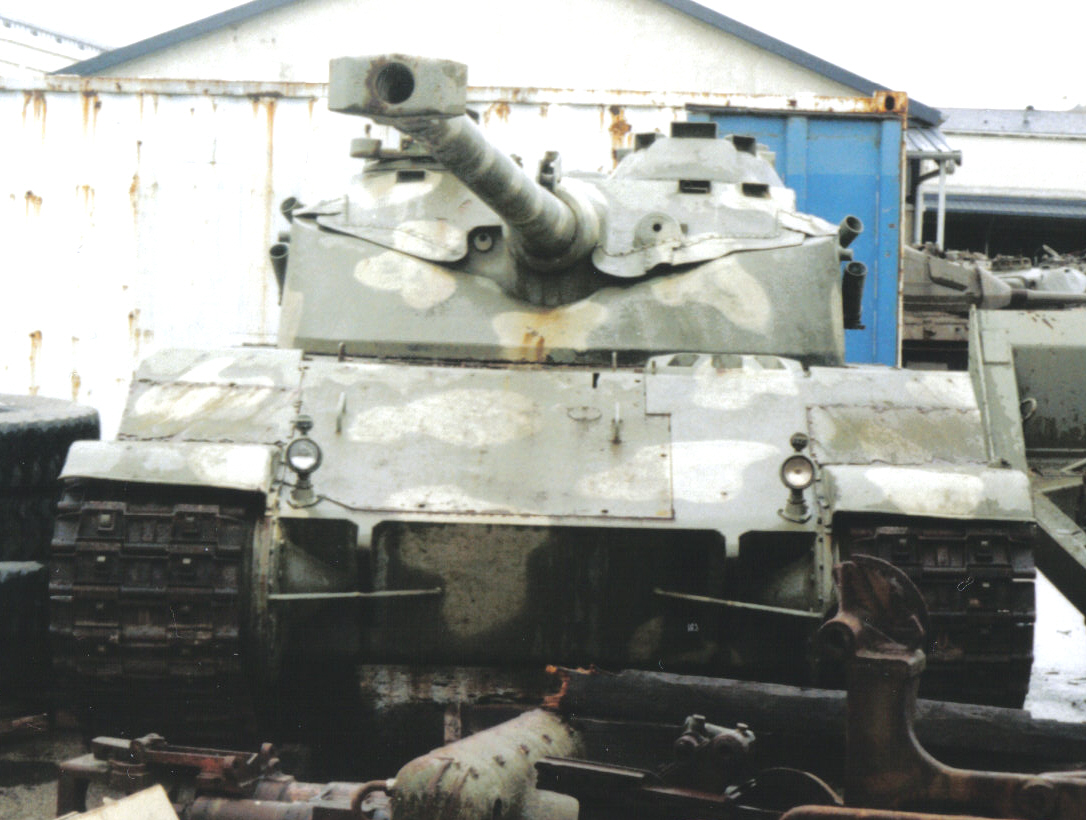
The 1955 Char Batignolles-Châtillon

With the demise of the 100-millimeter (3.9 in) AMX 50 program in 1951, France temporarily officially abandoned the thought of producing a medium tank. It was expected that West Germany would soon be allowed to rearm, and the Germans had appeared to entertain the concept of equipping their forces with a host of low-cost light, but relatively powerfully armed tanks, their quantity compensating for a lack of full armament parity with the latest medium tanks. The prospect of delivering many thousands of these to the Germans induced the French to adopt the idea and plan to create light tank "Type 67" armoured divisions, for which the AMX-13/105 was specially designed. A private enterprise design aimed at fulfilling the same requirement was the somewhat larger Char Batignolles-Châtillon. A derived medium tank prototype of the latter, made in 1955, proved that it was possible to produce a tank with a first-rate gun and frontally protected with 80-millimeter (3.1 in) steel equivalence within a weight constraint of 30 metric tons (33 short tons). This revived interest in the medium tank concept.

In 1956, the WEU defence workgroup FINBEL (named after France, Italy, Netherlands, Belgium and Luxembourg), founded in 1953 and consisting of representatives of the various General Staffs, drafted a set of specifications for a new medium tank to eventually replace their American and British tanks. That same year, Germany joined the workgroup, turning it into FINABEL (the added "A" standing for Allemagne, "Germany" in French) and on 27 October 1956 at Colomb-Béchar a bilateral agreement was concluded between France and Germany to collaborate in building a tank. Though the other FINABEL nations did not formally participate, the type was called Europa-Panzer to indicate its common European nature, and experts from all countries were involved in the design process. The specifications (FINABEL 3A5) for the new tank called for a lightweight and mobile battle tank, setting the weight limit to 30 metric tons (33 short tons) and compromising the ability to heavily armour the vehicle. French and German engineers, during a conference in Bonn on 12 February 1957, defined the requirements for the future tank. This included a maximum width of 3.15 metres (10.3 ft), a height of 2.15 metres (7.1 ft) and a 105-millimetre (4.1 in) tank gun, to be developed by the Franco-German military research institute at Saint Louis. The new tank would have an air-cooled, petrol engine, a torsion bar suspension with hydraulic shocks, a power-to-weight ratio of at least 30 horsepower (22 kW)/metric ton and a road range of at least 350 kilometres (220 mi). In May, Italy joined the project, though only nominally, without any material contribution, because after the war it had no tank design bureaus. That same year, on 28 November, the French and German ministries of defence in Paris agreed upon a contract which would allow both countries to produce two prototypes separately. The next year, however, the project suffered a first setback when Charles de Gaulle took power in France, creating the Fifth Republic: the Paris treaty had as its main point developing a common nuclear weapon and on 17 June 1958 de Gaulle decided to refuse Germany and Italy the atomic bomb, to avoid antagonizing the US and United Kingdom. This made Germany lose much interest in a common tank project also.

The French prototypes were developed and produced by the Atelier de Construction d'Issy-les-Moulineaux, under the direction of General Joseph Molinié of the Direction des Études et Fabrications d'Armements (DEFA, the later Direction Technique des Armements Terrestres) and AMX head engineer Heissler, The first prototype was completed in September 1960 and tested from February 1961; the second, with an improved range finder and track was tested in July 1961. These first vehicles had a very rounded turret, in a deliberate imitation of the Soviet T-54, and Sofam petrol engines. Another seven, with an improved sleeker turret cast, were manufactured between 1961 and 1963. Work on the German prototypes was carried out by two teams, including Team A composed of Porsche, Maschinenbau Kiel, Luther & Jordan and Jung-Jungenthal . Team B was made up by Ruhrstahl, Rheinstahl-HANOMAG and Henschel. Wood mock-ups were completed in 1959, while the first two prototypes were finished by 1961 (completed by Team A).

== Development history ==
De Gaulle decided that France, though formally remaining a member, would no longer participate in the NATO military organization. This caused a rift between France and West Germany, which then started to emphasize standardization with American equipment, especially in armament, and to follow the new NATO policy to use multifuel diesel engines. German defence minister Franz Josef Strauss began to oppose the common tank project. In July 1963, the defence committee of the German Bundesrat decided to procure a purely national tank. In response, the same month the French government decided likewise.

Comparative trials were nevertheless held at Mailly-le-Camp, Meppen, Bourges and Satory between five French and five German prototypes between August and October 1963, under Italian, Dutch, Belgian and American supervision. The French type had received a separate national designation: AMX 30. The trials indicated that the German type, on 1 October also getting its own name Leopard, had a better mobility and acceleration. The French government decided that it could not procure a new tank until 1965, while the Germans refused to adopt the Franco-German 105-millimeter (4.1 in) tank gun, in lieu of the British Royal Ordnance L7, of which they had already ordered 1,500 in the autumn of 1962, their plan having failed for Rheinmetall to produce in Germany a common type of munition of sufficient quality. Suggestions to save the project by combining the French turret with the German chassis failed. As a result, the program was cancelled and the French and Germans definitely decided to adopt their two separate tanks.

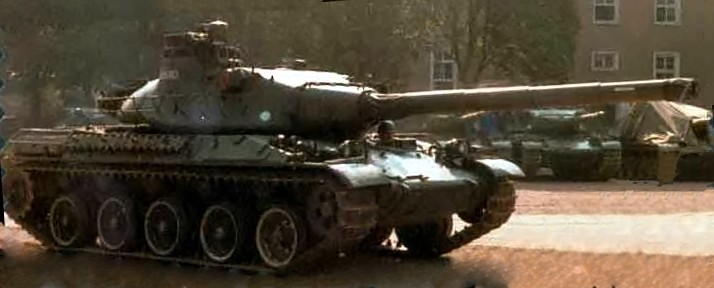
One of the two 1965 pre-production vehicles

The prototypes of the AMX-30 weighed 32.5 metric tons (35.8 short tons), and were compact, with a width of 3.1 metres (10 ft), comparable only to the Swiss Panzer 61, and a height of 2.28 meters (7.5 ft), comparable only to the Soviet T-55. In contrast to the AMX-50, the AMX-30 was issued a conventional turret, because it was found that it was more difficult to seal oscillating turrets from radioactive dust and against water when the tank was submerged. Oscillating turrets also had a large ballistic weakness in the area of the skirt and turret ring. Originally, the first two prototypes were powered by a 720 horsepower (540 kW) spark ignition engine, named the SOFAM 12 GSds. Later, a multi-fuel diesel engine was adopted, developed by Hispano-Suiza. The seven 1963 prototypes of the AMX-30 were later rebuilt with the new diesel engine. Two further prototypes, meant to be direct preproduction vehicles, were delivered in November 1965. Besides the diesel engines, they had changed hull and turret casts and different gun mantlets; the latter would again be changed in the production vehicles.

The first production versions of the AMX-30, named AMX 30B to distinguish them from the AMX 30A prototypes, were completed in June 1966, manufactured with a welded and cast hull and a fully cast turret. The production version of the tank had a combat weight of 36 metric tons (40 short tons). The AMX-30's survivability was based on its mobility; French engineers believed that the tank's mobility would have been compromised had they added enough steel plating to protect against modern anti-tank threats, including high-explosive anti-tank (HEAT) warheads. As a result, the type had the thinnest armour of any main battle tank produced at the time. The turret has a maximum armour thickness of 50 millimetres (2.0 in), the armour sloped at 70 degrees on the front plate and 23 degrees on the side, offering protection against 20-millimetre (0.79 in) armour piercing projectiles. The Line-of-Sight armour values are: 79-millimeter (3.1 in) for the front of the hull; 59-millimetre (2.3 in) for the forward sides of the hull; 30-millimetre (1.2 in) for the rear sides and rear of the hull; 15-millimetre (0.59 in) for the hull top and bottom; 80.8-millimeter (3.18 in) for the turret front; 41.5-millimeter (1.63 in) for the turret sides; 50-millimetre (2.0 in) for the turret rear and 20-millimetre (0.79 in) for the turret top. Further protection is offered by a nuclear, biological and chemical protection suit, including a ventilation system.

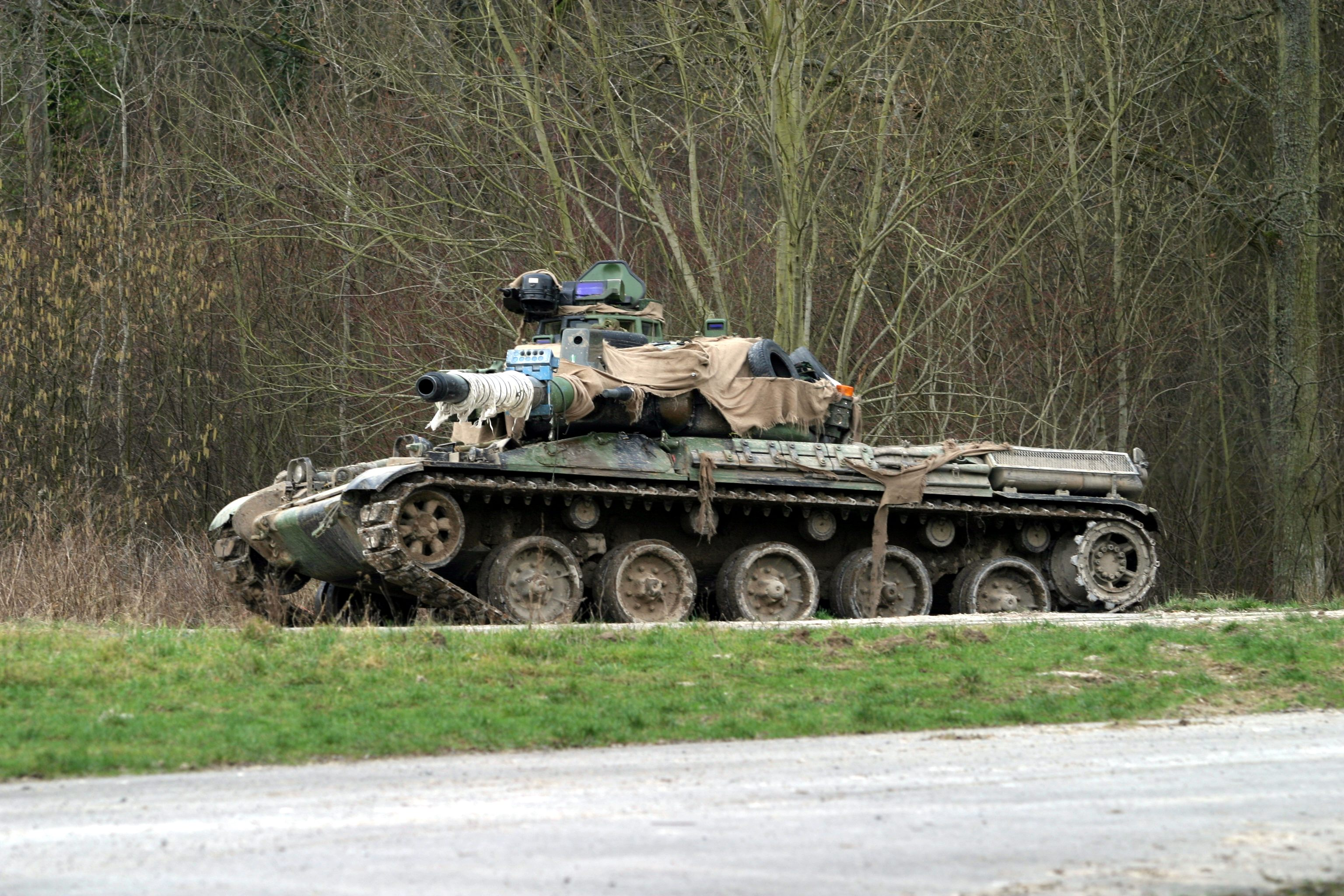
AMX-30 FORAD (Force Adverse), representing a T-72, on maneuver

One of the unique features of the AMX-30 was the Obus à Charge Creuse de 105 mm Modèle F1 (Obus G) HEAT projectile and its main gun, the Modèle F1, a monoblock steel 105-millimeter (4.1 in) cannon. HEAT warheads suffer when spin stabilized, a product of rifled barrels, causing the French to develop the Obus G, (Gresse). This projectile was composed of two major parts, including the outer shell and a suspended inner shell, separated by ball bearings. This allowed the projectile to be spin-stabilized, and therefore more accurate than a normal fin-stabilized HEAT round, while the inner shell did not spin, allowing the warhead to work at maximum efficiency. The warhead, containing 780 gram hexolite, could penetrate up to 400 millimeters (16 in) of steel armour and was effective against tanks at up to 3,000 meters (3,300 yd). As it combined a good accuracy with a penetration that was independent of range, it has been considered an "ideal round" for its day The AMX-30 was also designed to fire the OE F1 Mle.60 high explosive projectile, the SCC F1 training warhead and the OFUM PH-105 F1 smoke round. The main gun was coupled with a 380-millimeter (15 in) recoil brake, which had a maximum extension of 400 millimeters (16 in), and could depress to −8 degrees or elevate to 20 degrees. The turret's firepower was augmented by a coaxial 12.7-millimeter (0.50 in) M2 Browning machine gun. The tank commander also made use of a 7.62-millimeter (0.300 in) anti-aircraft machine gun on the turret roof. The vehicle carried 50 105-millimeter (4.1 in) projectiles, 748 12.7-millimeter (0.50 in) rounds and 2,050 7.62-millimeter (0.300 in) bullets. The tank commander was issued a cupola which offered ten all-around direct-vision episcopes, and a binocular telescope with 10x magnification. The commander was also given an optical full-field coincidence range finder. The gunner was given a telescoping gun sight and two observation periscopes.

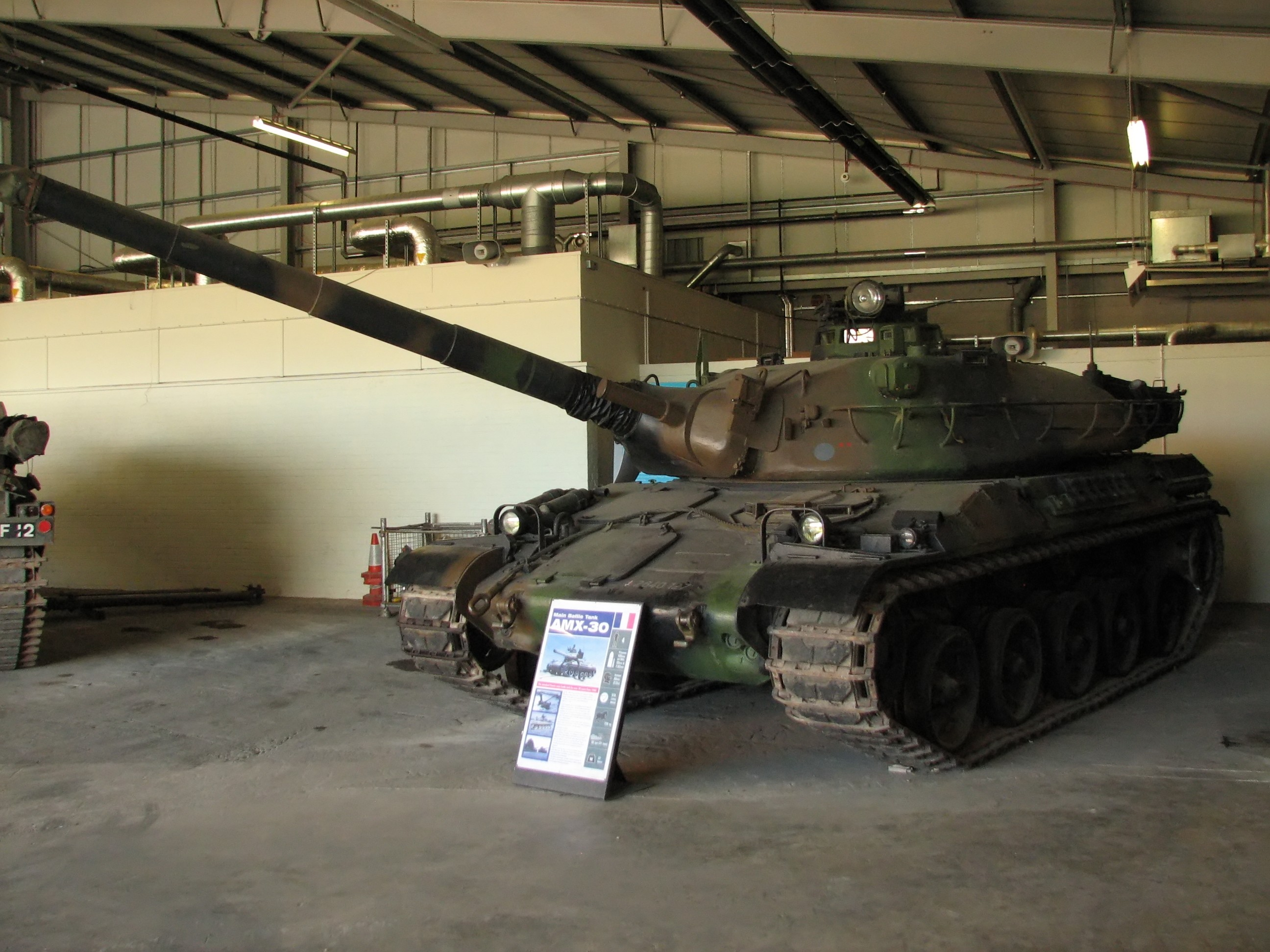
AMX-30B at the Bovington Tank Museum

The production version of the AMX-30 was fitted with Hispano-Suiza's HS-110 diesel engine, located in the rear of the hull. The 28.8 liters (1,760 cu in) engine could be replaced on the field in 45 minutes, and produced 720 horsepower (540 kW), offering the tank a maximum velocity of 65 kilometers per hour (40 mph) on roads. The fuel efficient engine, in conjunction with a total fuel capacity of 970 liters (260 U.S. gal), gave the AMX-30 a maximum road range of up to 600 kilometers (370 mi). The engine's drive is taken through a Gravina G.H.B.200C twin-plate centrifugal clutch. The gearbox was an AMX 5-SD-200D, with five forward gears and five reverse gears. This transmission was heavily influenced by that of the German Panther tank and was based on a project which had begun in 1938. The transmission was one of the AMX-30's major faults and caused a variety of mechanical problems, including that the driver would have to manually change gears at specific times, even if the tank was moving over rough terrain. The tank's weight is distributed over five double, aluminum-alloy, rubber-tyred road wheels on either side, propelled on 570-millimeter (22 in) wide tracks. The tank could ford 1.3-meter (1.4 yd) deep water obstacles without preparation, up to 2 meters (2.2 yd) with minor preparation, and up to 4 meters (4.4 yd) with full preparation. Full preparation for water operations consisted of the addition of a snorkel tube, the installation of blanking plates, carried on the front of the hull, over the engine compartment's air intake louvers, and the installation of infrared driving equipment, including a searchlight. In 1969, a special diving and evacuation training vehicle, without engine or tracks, was created and nicknamed the AMX 30 Gloutte (from the French faire glouglou, "gurgle"); it could be quickly be lowered by winch into a reservoir and was equipped with an escape tube.

=== Modernization ===
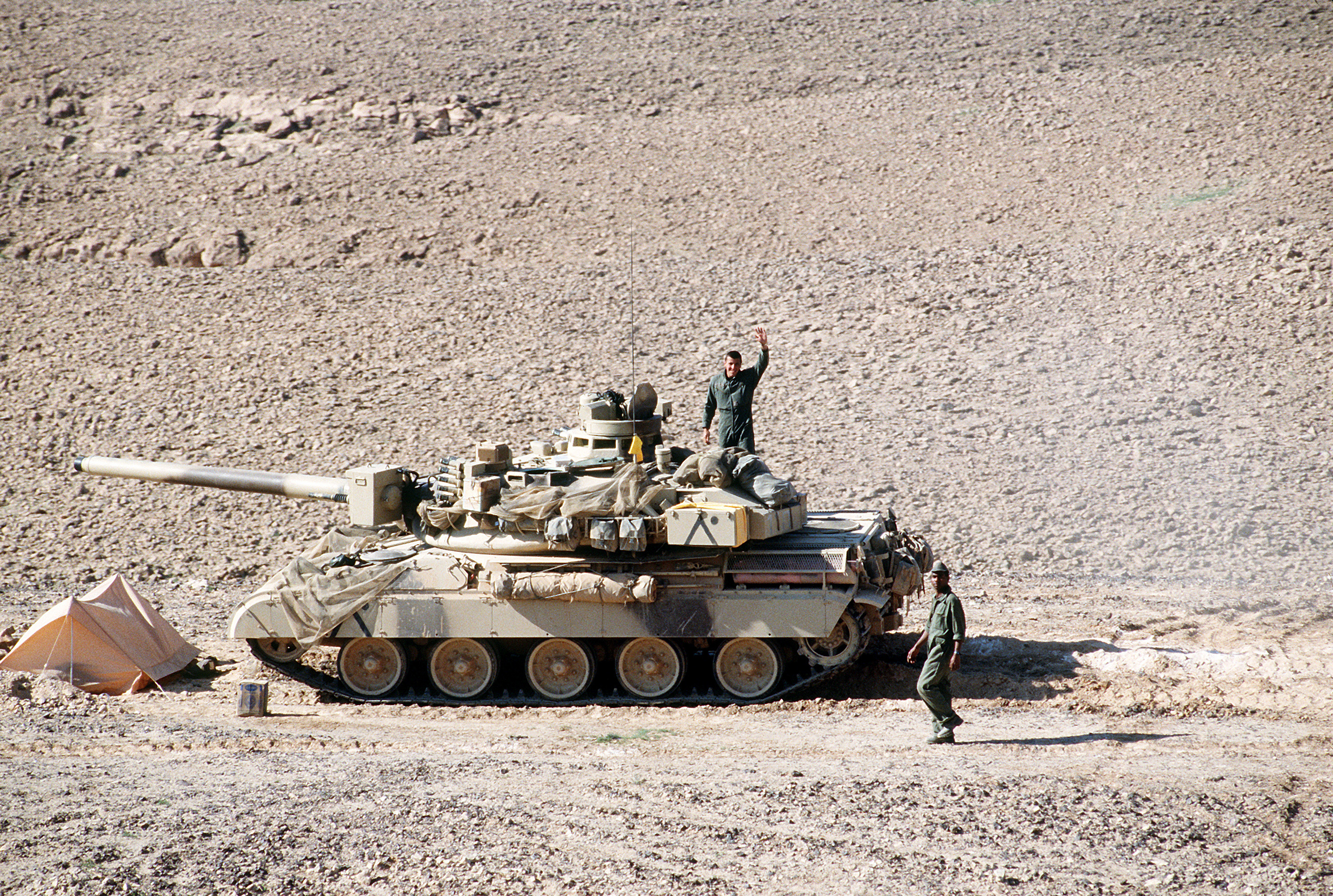
French AMX-30B2 deployed in Saudi Arabia, during military operations before the Gulf War

During the production run, many improvements were implemented. These did not include gun stabilization from 1971, and from 1972 replacing the original coaxial heavy machine gun with a dual purpose 20-millimeter (0.79 in) autocannon against light armour and helicopters, with the ability to depress to −8 degrees and elevate to 40 degrees. All French army vehicles were eventually brought to this newer standard; the designation remained AMX 30B.

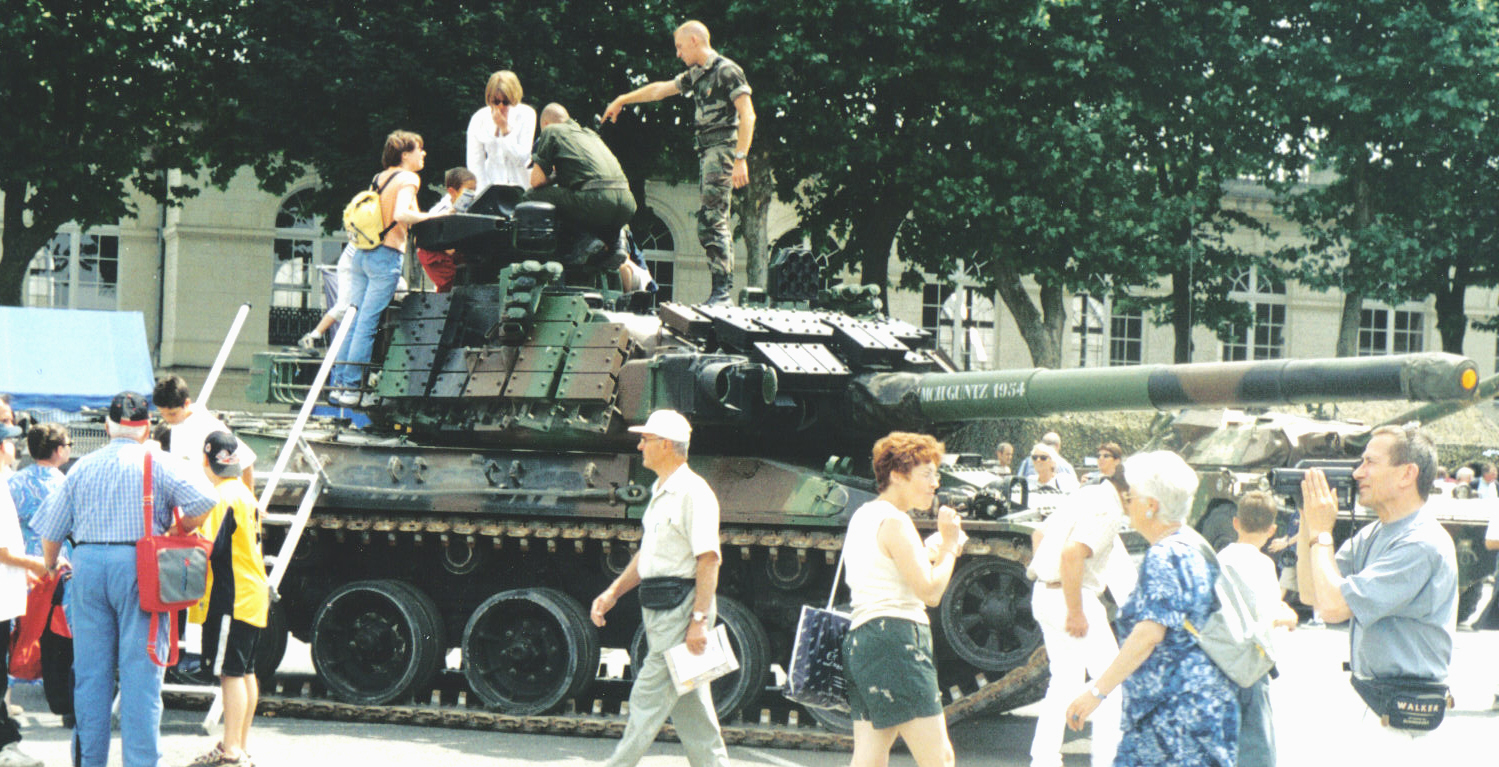
An AMX-30B2 Brennus. Note the ERA blocks mounted on the turret.

Beginning as early as 1973, only seven years after the beginning of production, the French began a research program for a future modification of the tank. The project was to result in a AMX 30 Valorisé ("upgraded AMX-30"). In June 1979, the French Army decided to both build new and modernize existing AMX-30s with an improved fire control system and a new transmission, and designated them AMX-30B2s. The first new production vehicles were taken into service in January 1982. Improvements to the COTAC APX M-508 fire control system included the installation of a laser rangefinder and a low-light TV (LLTV). The main gun's lethality was improved with the introduction of a new armour piercing fin stabilized discarding sabot (APFSDS). The original engine was exchanged for an improved variant, known as the HS-110.2, producing 680 horsepower (510 kW). The poor transmission was replaced with the semi-automatic SESM ENC200 transmission (now RENK France), with a torque converter. The suspension was improved by adopting new torsion bars and shocks, which increased the vertical deflection range of the road wheels, thereby improving the tank's off-road mobility. From 1998, the French army started to replace the engines of its remaining AMX-30 tanks and variants with 500 Renault Mack E9 750 hp engines.

Leclerc tank had already been ordered in the 1990s, however the AMX-30 continued to play a key role in the French army and two further up-grades were implemented in limited numbers for French rapid reaction force which was made up of 2 Tank Regiments 1er and 2e Chasseurs. The first upgrade was an Explosive Reactive Armour package called Brennus (often mistyped and uncorrected as "Brenus"). Final upgrade was the purchase of 500 Renault RVI Mack E9 turbocharged diesel engines generating 750 hp These two tank regiments in peacetime were combined into a single one;, but the other two AMX-30 regiments, the 2e/5e Dragons, only had their tanks adapted for a possible relatively quick upgrade, in case of an emergency. The BRENUS system used 112 GIAT BS (Brique de Surblindage) G2 explosive reactive boxes with a total weight of 1.7 metric tons (1.9 short tons), offering a protection equivalent to 400 millimeters (16 in) of steel at 60° versus shaped charges and more than 100 millimeters (3.9 in) of steel versus kinetic energy projectiles such as APFSDS. During the 1990s, the AMX-30 has also been used as a testbed for several stealth technologies, including air cooling of hull surfaces and the use of visual camouflage. This prototype is known as the Démonstrateur Furtif à Chenille. Its hull and turret are fully covered by a superstructure built of angled plates made of radar absorbent material.

In the late 1980s, a consortium of West German companies developed the Super AMX-30 modernization package for AMX-30B. The consortium itself consisted of AEG, Krupp Atlas Elektronik, MTU, Wegmann & Co., Diehl, ZF Friedrichshafen, and GLS. The upgrades to the power packs were new MTU MB833 Ka501 diesel engine with 850 hp, ZF LSG-3000 automatic transmission, new engine cooling system, and increased fuel capacity up to 1,028 liters. The upgrades on mobility also includes upgraded torsion bars, hydraulic shock absorbers, new slightly larger road wheels, and Diehl Type 234 tracks. The fire control systems were upgraded with MOLF-30 modular laser FCS by Krupp Atlas Elektronik, gyro-stabilized gun and gunner's day/night sight, laser rangefinder, and fully electric turret drive. Optional additional armour on the turret also available per buyer request. A single prototype was made and were publicly unveiled and tested in Saudi Arabia. The upgrade failed to find a buyer.

=== Comparison to contemporary tanks ===
	M60A1	Leopard 1A1	AMX-30B	T-55	T-62	T-64A	Chieftain Mk.2
Weight	47.62 metric tons (52.49 short tons)	41.5 metric tons (45.7 short tons)	36 metric tons (40 short tons)	36 metric tons (40 short tons)	40 metric tons (44 short tons)	38 metric tons (42 short tons)	54 metric tons (60 short tons)
Gun	105 mm (4.1 in) M68 rifled	105 mm (4.1 in) L7A3 rifled	105 mm (4.1 in) L/56 F1 rifled	100 mm (3.9 in) D-10T2S rifled	115 mm (4.5 in) U-5T smoothbore	125 mm (4.9 in) D-68 smoothbore	120 mm (4.7 in) L11 rifled
Ammunition	63 rounds	55 rounds	50 rounds	43 rounds	40 rounds	36 rounds	62 rounds
Road range (integral fuel)	480 km (300 mi)	600 km (370 mi)	600 km (370 mi)	500 km (310 mi)	450 km (280 mi)	500 km (310 mi)	500 km (310 mi)
Engine output	750 hp (560 kW)	830 hp (620 kW)	720 hp (540 kW)	580 hp (430 kW)	580 hp (430 kW)	700 hp (520 kW)	750 hp (560 kW)
Maximum speed (on road)	48 km/h (30 mph)	65 km/h (40 mph)	65 km/h (40 mph)	50 km/h (31 mph)	50 km/h (31 mph)	60 km/h (37 mph)	40 km/h (25 mph)
Armour (front turret plate)	250 mm (9.8 in) LOS	60 mm (2.4 in) rounded	80.8 mm (3.18 in)	203 mm (8.0 in)	242 mm (9.5 in)	450 mm (18 in)	390 mm (15 in)
Armour (glacis plate)	109 mm (4.3 in) at 65°	70 mm (2.8 in) at 60°	80 mm (3.1 in) at 68°	97 mm (3.8 in) at 58°	102 mm (4.0 in) at 60°	430 mm (17 in) LOS	388 mm (15.3 in) LOS

== Variants ==
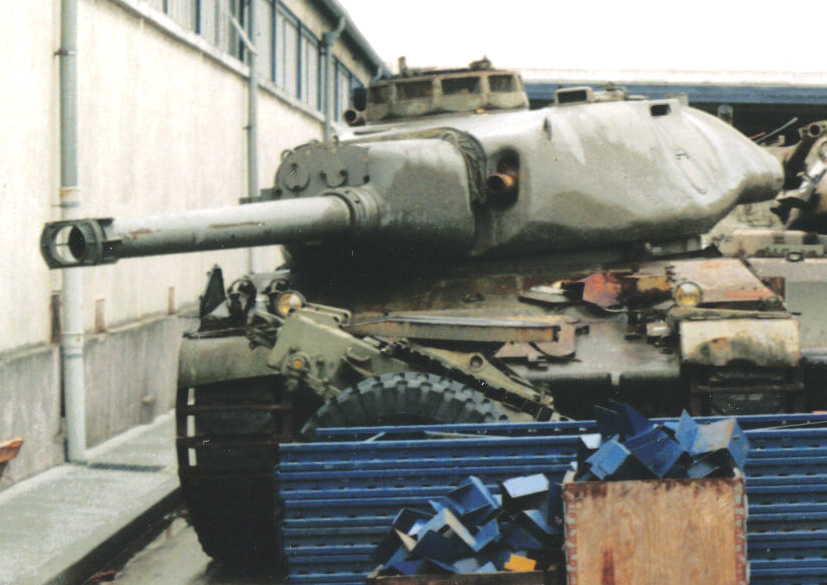
The AMX 30 ACRA prototype

The AMX-30 has a number of different variations, including a number of other armoured vehicles based on the same chassis. A simplified version of the tank, without the infrared searchlight and periscopes and a less complex commander's cupola was developed for export, known as the "basic AMX-30". This version also came devoid of the pressurized air filtering system, and moved the smaller 7.62-millimeter (0.300 in) machine gun into the coaxial position and the larger 12.7-millimeter (0.50 in) M2 to the turret roof. Another version was considered for the French Army, adopting a 142-millimeter (5.6 in) tank gun able to fire the supersonic ACRA (Anti-Char Rapide Autopropulsé) anti-tank guided missile, as well as high explosive rounds. A prototype was finished in 1967 with a new cast turret, wide enough to hold the much larger armament. However, the high costs of the missiles forced the French Army to abandon the program in 1972. The vehicles based on the chassis include an armoured recovery vehicle, a bridgelayer, a self-propelled anti-aircraft vehicle, a tactical nuclear missile launcher and a self-propelled artillery piece.

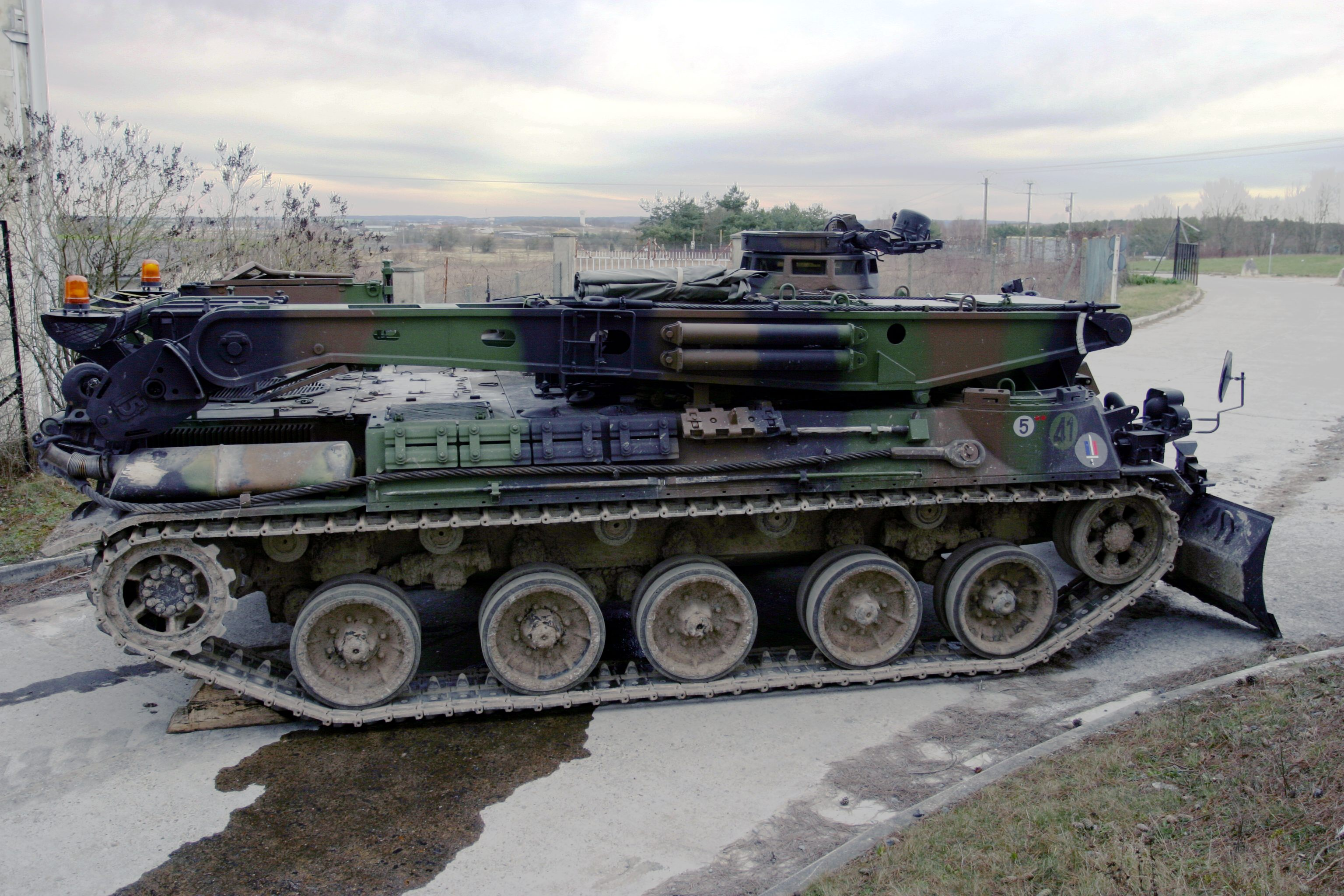
Right side of an AMX-30D of the French Army

=== AMX-30D – Dépanneur-Niveleur ===
The armoured recovery vehicle, known as the AMX-30D (AMX-30 Dépanneur-Niveleur), was designed to recuperate or help maintain vehicles in the field. Work on the AMX-30D began in 1966, as the French Army researched developing a recovery vehicle to be issued to units receiving the AMX-30 tank. A prototype was produced and delivered for experimentation in 1971, and in February 1973 the first of a pre-series of five vehicles was delivered. That same year, another 100 AMX-30Ds were ordered, and these began production in 1975. The recovery vehicle includes a winch powered by the vehicle's engine, with the ability to pull a maximum of 35 metric tons (39 short tons) of weight. The vehicle also has an 80-meter (87 yd) heavy towing cable, while an auxiliary winch has another 120-meter (130 yd) towing cable, able to tow up to 20 metric tons (22 short tons) when working over the front of the AMX-30D. In the latter case the vehicle must be supported by removable props, which are carried on the vehicle, and the bulldozer blade must be lowered on the ground. The crane can lift up the 3.29 metric tons (3.63 short tons) power pack and the 10 metric tons (11 short tons) turret. Instead of a turret, the AMX-30D is fitted with a superstructure, and weighs 36 metric tons (40 short tons), although with the extra power pack it can weigh up to 40 metric tons (44 short tons). The vehicle can protect itself with a 7.62-millimeter (0.300 in) machine gun. The driver's visibility is aided by the inclusion of three M-223 episcopes. The AMX-30D has a maximum on-road velocity of 60 kilometers per hour (37 mph) and a maximum road range of 500 kilometers (310 mi).

=== AMX-30H – Poseur de pont ===
The AMX-30H bridgelayer, or Poseur de pont, consists of the AMX-30's chassis with a box-like superstructure, supporting a scissor-type folding bridge. The 22-meter-long (24 yd) bridge can span 20-meter (22 yd) gaps. The bridge has a width of 3.1 meters (3.4 yd), but can be increased to 3.95 meters (4.32 yd) through the use of appliqué panels. It can support weighs of up to 46 metric tons (51 short tons). Bridgelayer development began as early as 1963, although it was not until June 1967 that development began on a prototype. Although a prototype designated AMX-30H was finished in 1968, it was not until 1971 that the vehicle was evaluated. At the end of the evaluations in September 1971, a pre-series of five vehicles was ordered, resulting in a new period of evaluations beginning on 16 October 1972. In 1975, the AMX-30H was declared standard in the French Army, although none of these vehicles were ever ordered. 12 vehicles were purchased by the Saudi Arabian Army.

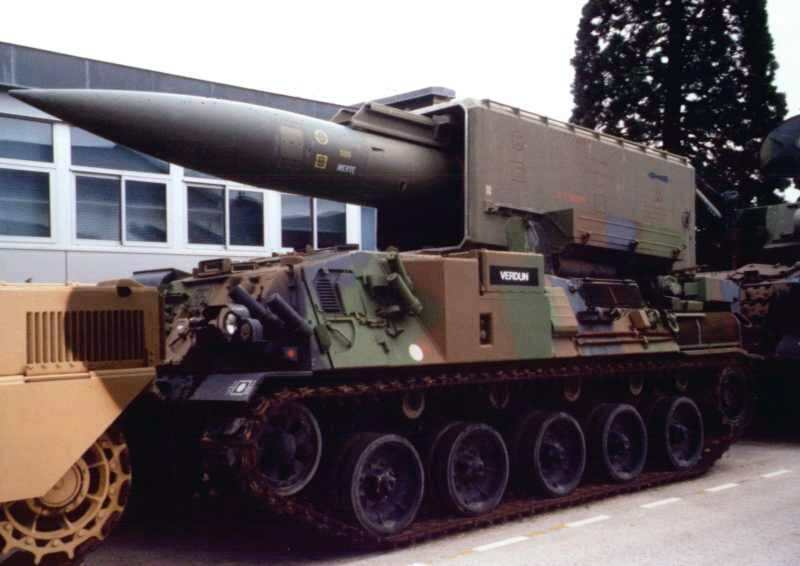
Pluton tactical nuclear missile launcher

=== AMX-30 DCA – défense contre avion ===
The self-propelled anti-aircraft gun began development in 1969 to provide this type of vehicle to the French Army and for export. Although ultimately none were ordered for France, in 1975 Saudi Arabia ordered an improved version (53 units,) denominated the AMX-30SA (first known as the AMX-30 DCA, for "défense contre avion".) Developed to defend against low-altitude attacks, the system included two Hispano-Suiza 30-millimeter (1.2 in) 831 A automatic guns, coupled to an Oeil-noir fire control system. This system had already been installed on the AMX-13, in lieu of a heavier chassis, using a turret designated the S 401 A. Although this particular vehicle began production in 1962, the appearance of the AMX-30 offered a larger chassis to which the S 401 A turret could be mounted on, providing superior mobility. The heavier AMX-30 also provided a more stable platform for the guns, and allowed the system to carry much more ammunition (1,200 rounds, as compared to the 600 carried by the AMX-13 version). The guns were designed to fire in 5-round or 15-round bursts, with a cyclic rate of fire of 650 rounds per minute. They were controlled by an analogue computer, receiving information from a Doppler radar, which could be folded into an armoured box when not in use to protect from damage. The fire control depended on visual tracking, and so could only work in daylight and clear weather.

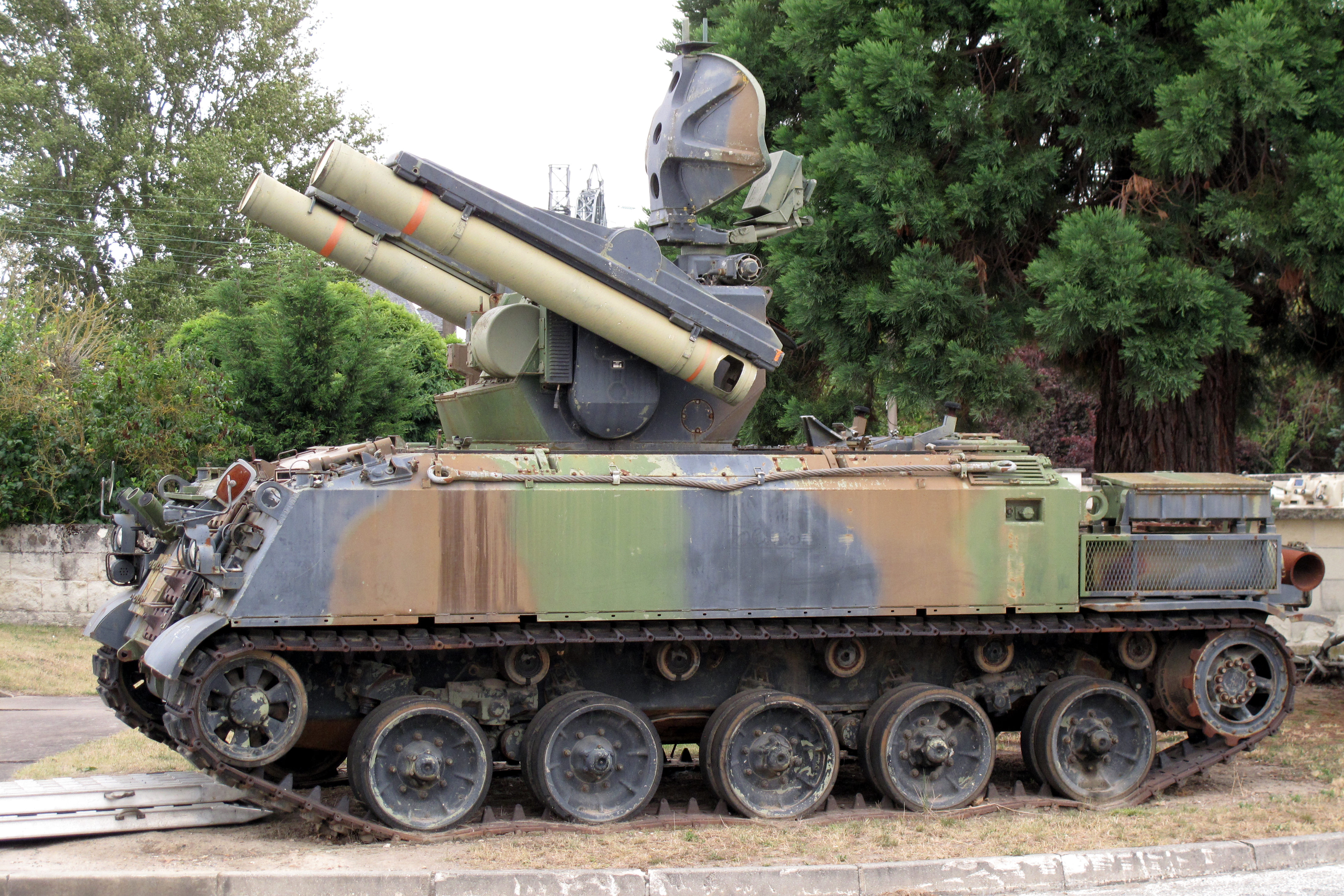
Left side of a Roland surface-to-air missile launcher

=== AMX-30R and Pluton ===
Three missile systems were developed to be mounted on the AMX-30 chassis. Recognizing the need for tactical nuclear missile mobile launchers, the French Army began developing the Pluton missile in 1963. In 1964, the program was suspended and instead the French Army opted for a missile with a longer range, able to be mounted on the AMX-30. A contract to develop the system was established in 1968. The first prototype was soon delivered and testing occurred between July and August 1970, followed by the production of a second prototype in 1971. Two more prototypes were fabricated in 1972. The next year, the vehicle was put into mass production and by 1 May 1974 four of these vehicles had been delivered to the 3rd Artillery Regiment. The missile itself weighs 2.4 metric tons (2.6 short tons) and is 7.6 meters (8.3 yd) long. Using a simplified inertial guidance system and a solid propellant rocket motor, the Pluton has a maximum range of 120 kilometers (75 mi). The second missile system is the AMX-30R (Roland) surface-to-air missile launching system, which began development in 1974. Five vehicles of a pre-series were completed by 1977 and then evaluated, prompting the order of 183 vehicles that same year.

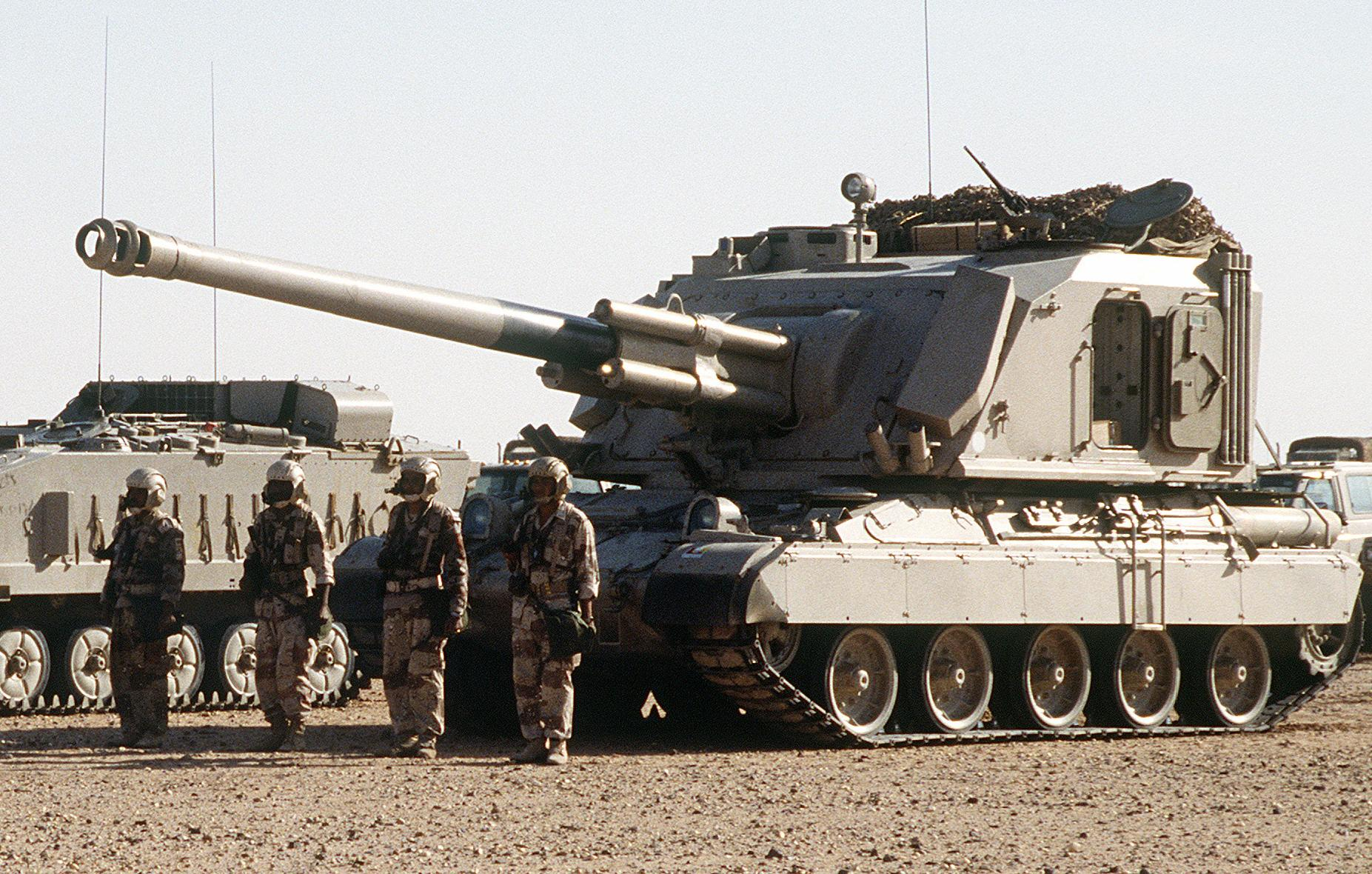
A GCT in service of Saudi Arabia

The Roland includes a rectangular superstructure, taller than that of both the AMX-30D and the Pluton, which houses the radar system and mounts two launching tubes on either side, with an autoloading system feeding from an eight missile reserve inside the superstructure. The Roland's exploration radar has a detection range of 16 kilometers (9.9 mi). The third missile system, called the AMX-30SA SAM, was developed in 1975 for Saudi Arabia, to fire the SA-10 Shahine, developed and manufactured by Thomson-CSF; the launching vehicle was heavily based on the AMX-30R.

=== AMX 30 AuF1 canon automoteur ===
The canon automoteur de 155 GCT (for Grande Cadence de Tir, fast rate of fire) was developed based on the AMX-30 chassis to provide tactical artillery support to units in the French Army, who refer to it as the AMX 30 AuF1. The 155-millimeter (6.1 in) howitzer was 40 calibers long, and was autoloaded allowing it a rate of fire of eight rounds per minute, with a maximum range of 30 kilometers (19 mi) with the LU211 round. The turret enables the gun to have an elevation of up to 66 degrees, and allows it to traverse a full 360 degrees.

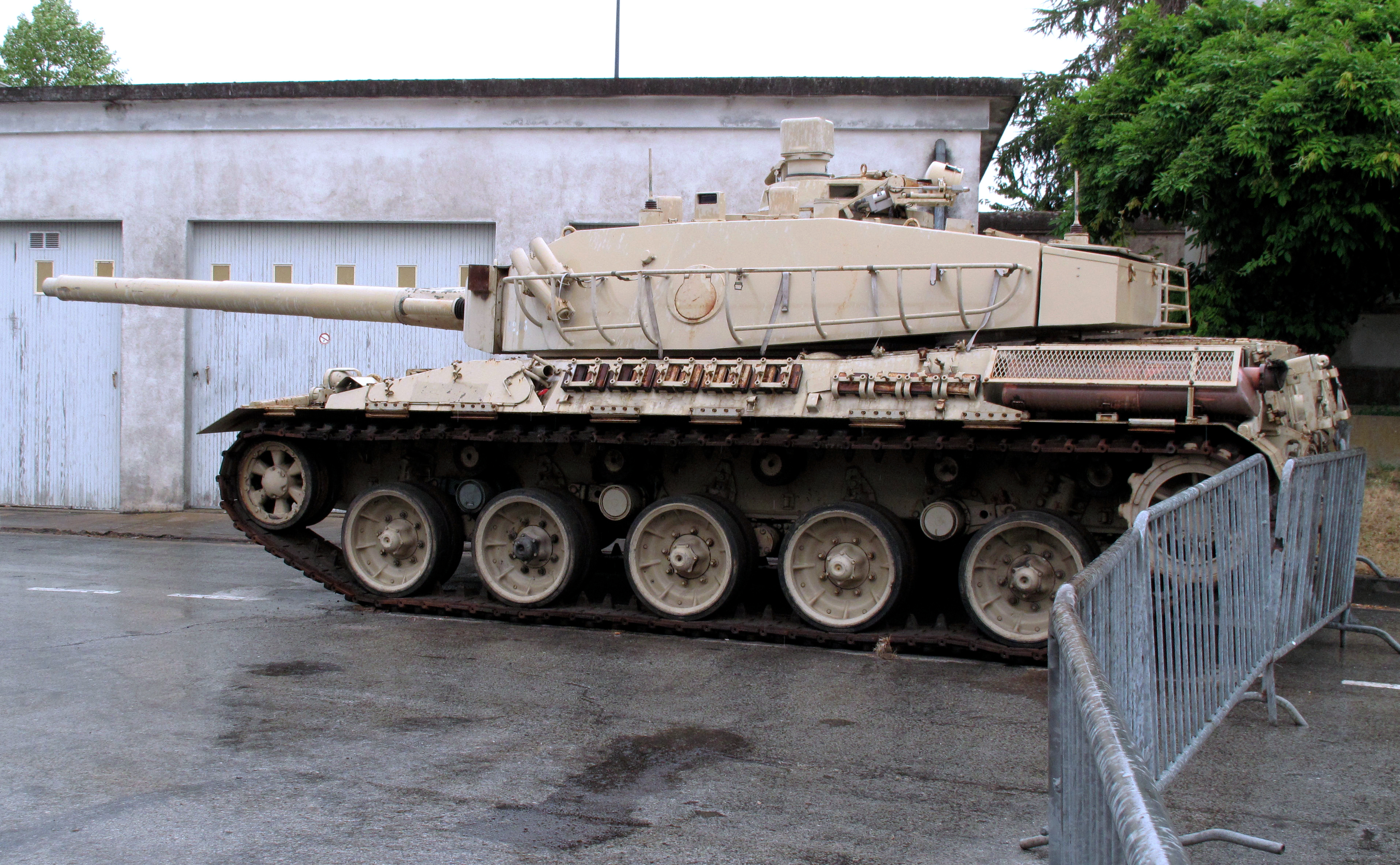
AMX-32 at Saumur Général Estienne museum

The vehicle carries 42 rounds of ammunition, with combustible cartridge cases. The origins of the decision to design a self-propelled howitzer can be traced back to 1969, with the first prototype completed in 1972. By 1979, seven prototypes had been produced, and six pre-series vehicles, followed by the production of 110 vehicles. This order was later increased to 190.

=== AMX 32 ===
The first prototype of an improved AMX-30 for the export market, known as the AMX-32, was unveiled in June 1979. Originally intended as an alternative for the AMX-30B2, and deliberately imitating the spaced armour concept the Germans had successfully implemented on the Leopard 1A3 and A4, the AMX-32 fielded greater armour protection to offer increased survivability against anti-tank guided missiles. A 20-millimeter (0.79 in) autocannon was included as the main gun's coaxial weapon, and a 7.62-millimeter (0.300 in) machine gun attached to the roof. However, no orders were ever placed.

== Production ==
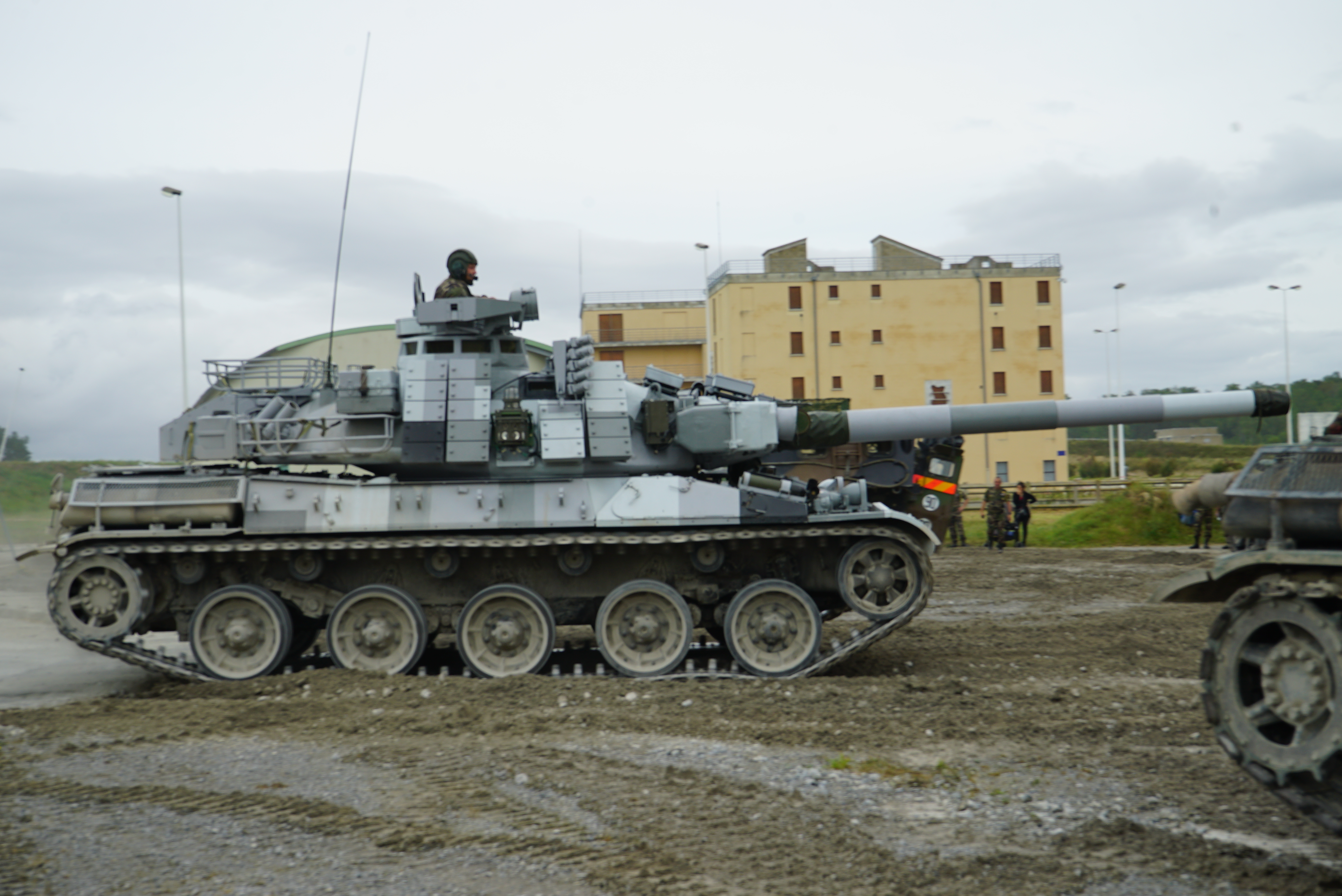
French AMX-30B FORAD in urban camouflage in 2016. The last 4 were withdrawn from service in 2017/2018

AMX-30 production occurred at the Atelier de Construction de Roanne in the town of Roanne. This heavy manufacturing factory was built during World War I to produce artillery shells, although by 1952 the factory had begun producing armoured fighting vehicles. Before producing the AMX-30, for example, it had made 1,900 AMX-13s and variants. The Roanne factory was responsible for final assembly, most components were made elsewhere: the powerplant by the Atelier de Construction de Limoges, the full armour set by the Ateliers et Forges de la Loire, the turret by the Atelier de Construction de Tarbes, the cannon by the Atelier de Construction de Bourges, the cupola and machine-gun by the Manufacture d'Armes de Saint-Étienne and the optics by the Atelier de Construction de Puteaux; all these again used many subcontractors. In a series of corporate mergers under state guidance, most of these firms would eventually be concentrated into GIAT.

Originally, 300 AMX-30s were ordered by the French Army, and by 1971 the order had been increased to 900, divided between eight batches, including all variants based on the chassis. Beginning in 1966, ten AMX-30s were assembled per month, and the first five were issued in August 1966 to the 501st Régiment de Chars de Combat. Monthly production grew to 15–20 tanks as new factories began to manufacture components of the vehicle and existing factories increased their production potential. However, in April 1969, production was again reduced to ten per month. By 1971, about 180 vehicles were in service; in 1975 delivery began of the last 143 units of the final eighth batch of the original order. In 1985, the number of AMX-30s had risen to 1,173. By the end of production, France had accepted 1,355 AMX-30s into service, including 166 brand-new AMX-30B2s. Another 493 tanks were refitted and modernized to AMX-30B2 standards; originally 271 new and 820 refitted vehicles had been planned. The French Army also accepted a large number of variants, including 195 self-propelled howitzers, 44 AMX-30 Pluton tactical nuclear missile launchers, 183 AMX-30Rs, 134 AMX-30Ds and 48 engineer vehicles (AMX-30EBG). The last 35 new battle tanks were in 1989 ordered by Cyprus and the last new variant vehicles, a batch of twenty GCTs, in 1994 by France.

In the late 1990s, the French Army began to accept the new Leclerc main battle tank to replace the antiquated AMX-30. The first units to be outfitted with the new tank were the 501st and 503rd tank regiments, followed by the 6th and 12th Cuirassier Regiments.

== Export ==
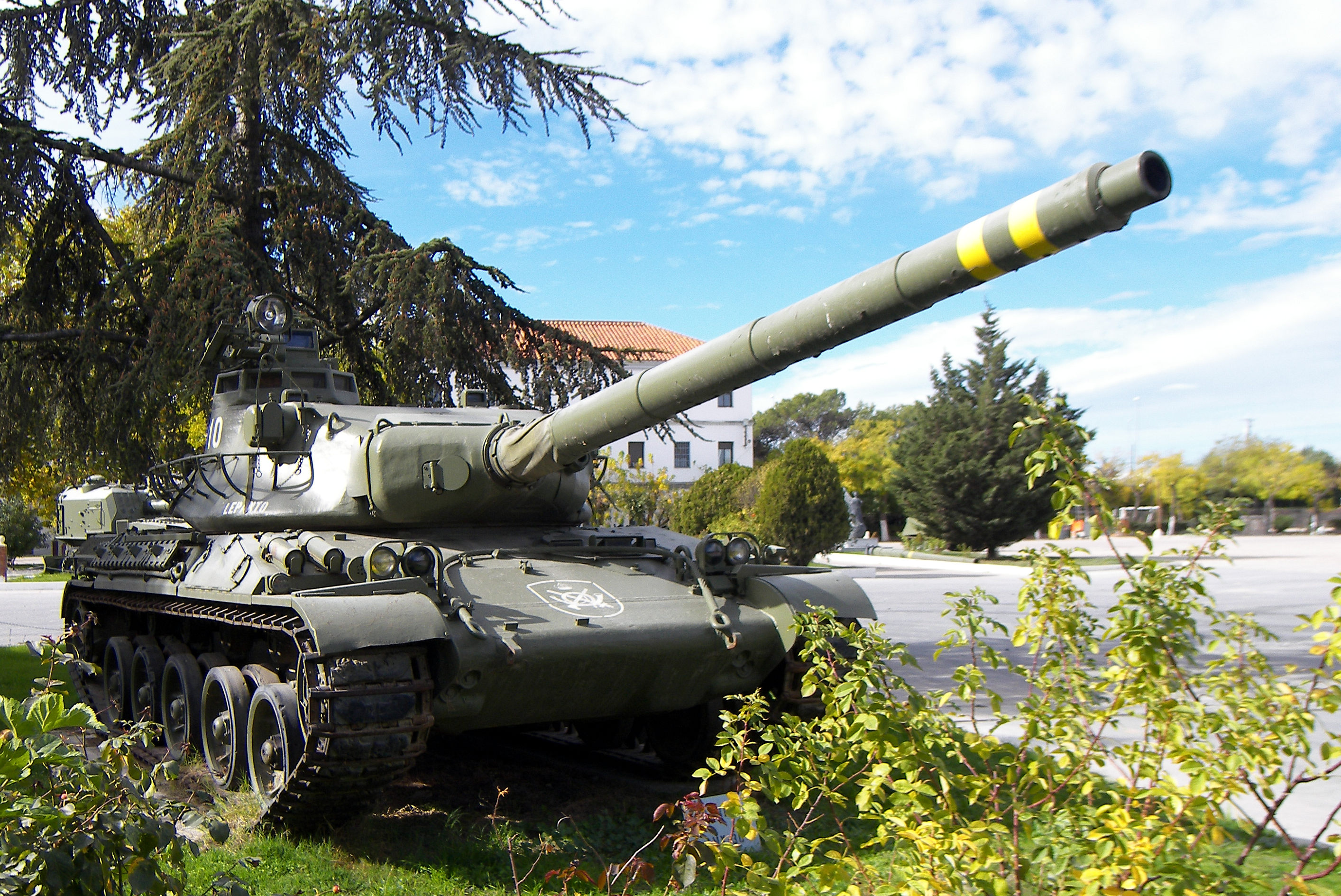
A Spanish AMX-30 on display at the El Goloso Museum of Armoured Vehicles

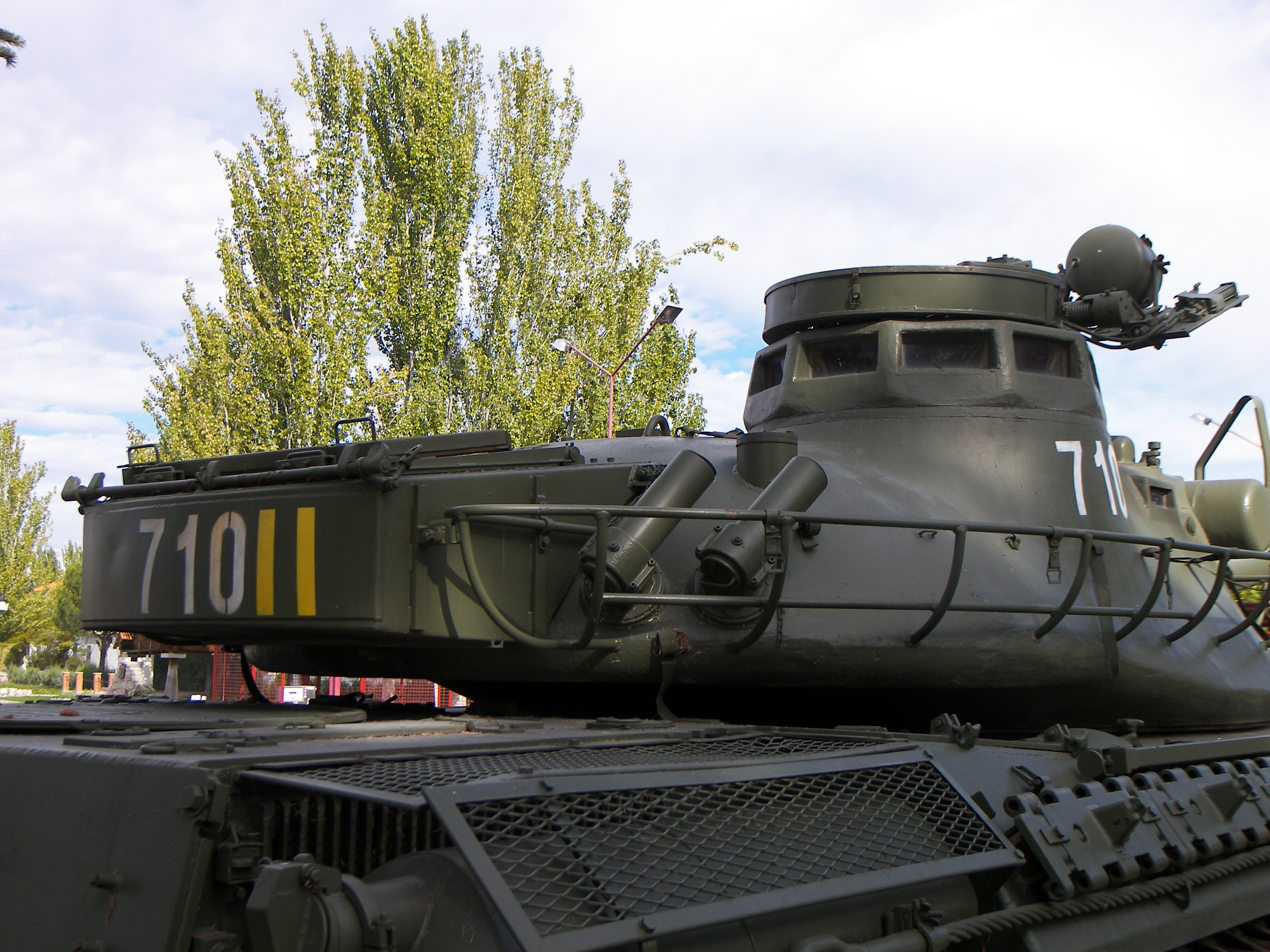
A close-up view of an AMX-30's turret bustle rack

Prototype of AMX-30C2 sporting a 105mm rifled tank gun

Having in February 1964 decided to produce its own battle tank, Israel at first considered licensed production of AMX-30 hulls, while importing the turrets from France. Favouring heavier armour over mobility, Major-General Israel Tal discontinued negotiations with France when the United Kingdom agreed to allow licensed production of the Chieftain tank, in 1966.

France eventually also failed to obtain orders from the remaining two FINABEL nations, Belgium and the Netherlands: the Dutch did not even test the type and the Belgians ordered the Leopard when France refused to allow partial component production of the AMX-30 in Belgium, fearing it would increase the unit cost.

Less costly and easier to maintain, the AMX-30 has been preferred over the Leopard 1 by less affluent or developed nations.

In 1969, the Greek military junta agreed to procure a total of 190 AMX-30s and 14 AMX-30Ds, making Greece the first foreign nation to purchase the French tank. Throughout the 1960s, Spain had considered both the AMX-30 and the Leopard 1 to complement their existing fleet of M47 and M48 Patton tanks. Ultimately, Spain opted for the AMX-30 for a variety of reasons, including British unwillingness to sell the L7 tank gun to an authoritarian regime and the French offer to allow the AMX-30 to be manufactured in Spain. Spain ordered 19 tanks in 1970, and later agreed to manufacture another 180 tanks in Spain. In 1979, Spain began the production of a second batch of 100 tanks, completing a total of 299 AMX-30s issued to the Spanish Army; these were designated AMX-30Es. Spain also procured 10 AMX-30Ds and 18 AMX-30Rs. As production of the AMX-30E ended in 1979, the Spanish Army was already looking for a modernization program to improve the quality of the tank's mobility. In 1987, the Spanish Army began a six-year modernization program which brought 150 tanks up to AMX-30EM2 standards and modified another 149 tanks to AMX-30EM1 standards. The former was a much more complete upgrade, which saw improvements to the tank's mobility through the adoption of a new engine and gearbox, as well as to the tank's firepower, with the development of a new kinetic energy penetrator and the introduction of a far more complex and accurate fire control system for the tank's gunner, amongst other things. The AMX-30EM1 was termed a "reconstruction" and only saw improvements to the tank's mobility by adopting a new transmission and renovating much of the vehicle's worn out systems, such as the brakes, indicators and controls. These rebuilt AMX-30s were soon replaced by M60 Patton tanks procured from the United States in the early 1990s, while its fleet of AMX-30EM2s was later replaced by the B1 Centauro anti-tank vehicle.

In 1972, France was able to gain a contract with Saudi Arabia over the purchase of 190 of the AMX-30S variant, designed for the desert environment of the Middle Eastern nation. Named the Palmier Contract, Saudi Arabia's tanks were delivered between 1973 and 1979, while 59 AMX-30Ds were exported between 1975 and 1979, 12 AMX-30Ps between 1977 and 1979, and finally 51 self-propelled howitzers, delivered between 1979 and 1980. Between 1979 and 1981, Saudi Arabia also received 52 AMX-30SAs and later 50 AMX-30C1 Shanine-2s delivered in two batches, between 1980 and 1989. By the 21st century, 50% of Saudi Arabia's AMX-30 fleet were in storage, given that the AMX-30 lacked the capabilities to deal with more modern threats, such as against Iraqi T-62s and T-72s, and Israeli Merkava tanks. These were largely displaced by an order for 315 M1A2 Abrams tanks in 1989, and the acquisition of 450 M60A3 Patton tanks. Although Saudi Arabia planned to procure more M1 tanks, it was unable to do so for financial reasons and the AMX-30 has still not been retired.

Venezuela originally placed an order for 142 tanks in 1972, although this was later reduced to 82 and four AMX-30Ds. In the mid-1980s, Venezuela adopted a modernization plan for its deprecated AMX-30s, opting to replace the original engine with a new Continental AVDS-1790-5A diesel engine, producing 908 horsepower (677 kW) and exchanging the existing transmission with an Allison CD-850-6A. Venezuelan AMX-30s received new fuel tanks, increasing the tank's road range to 720 kilometers (450 mi), while firepower was improved through the adoption of a modern Lansadot MkI fire control system and Ballistic computer from Elbit Systems. In 1977, France and Qatar signed an agreement which garnered France another 24 AMX-30s sold, which would rise to 54 when Qatar ordered a further 30 AMX-30B2s in 1987. The United Arab Emirates placed an order in 1977 for 64 tanks and a single armoured recovery vehicle, to complete an armoured brigade, in 1977. Due to political issues between Chile and Argentina, the former placed an order for 46 tanks, although this was later cut short to 21 when the contract was cancelled by the French government in 1981. In 1982, Cyprus acquired a total of 16 AMX-30B2s and a single AMX-30D, and later ordered another 36 AMX-30B2s. Total production of the AMX-30 and variants totaled 3,571 units.

Later many used vehicles were resold to other nations: in 2005 Cyprus had 102 AMX-30s (obtained from Greece) and 52 AMX-30B2s; Bosnia 32 AMX-30s (from the UAE). French strength had dwindled to about 250 AMX-30B2s.

== Combat history ==
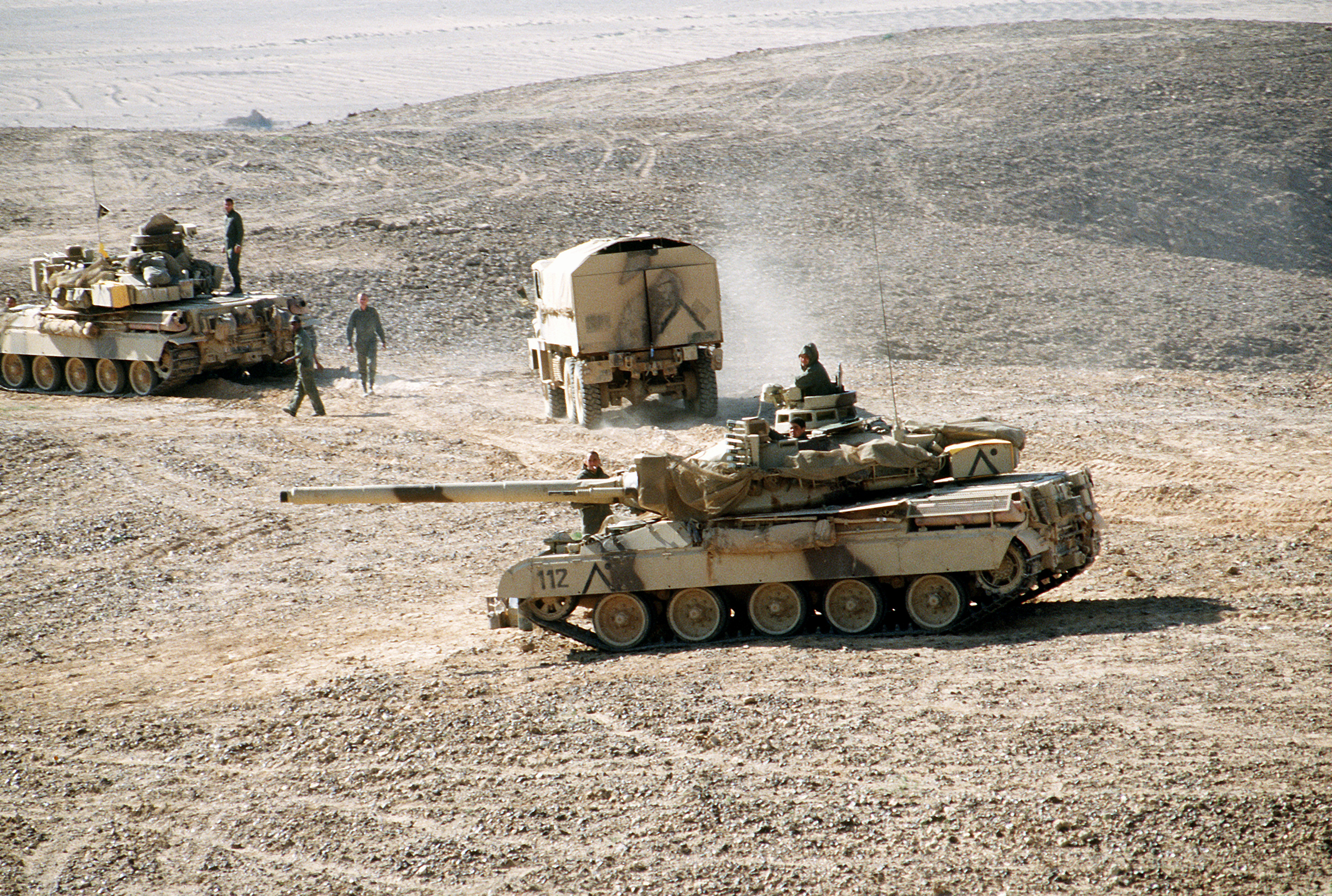
Two French AMX-30s in Al-Salman

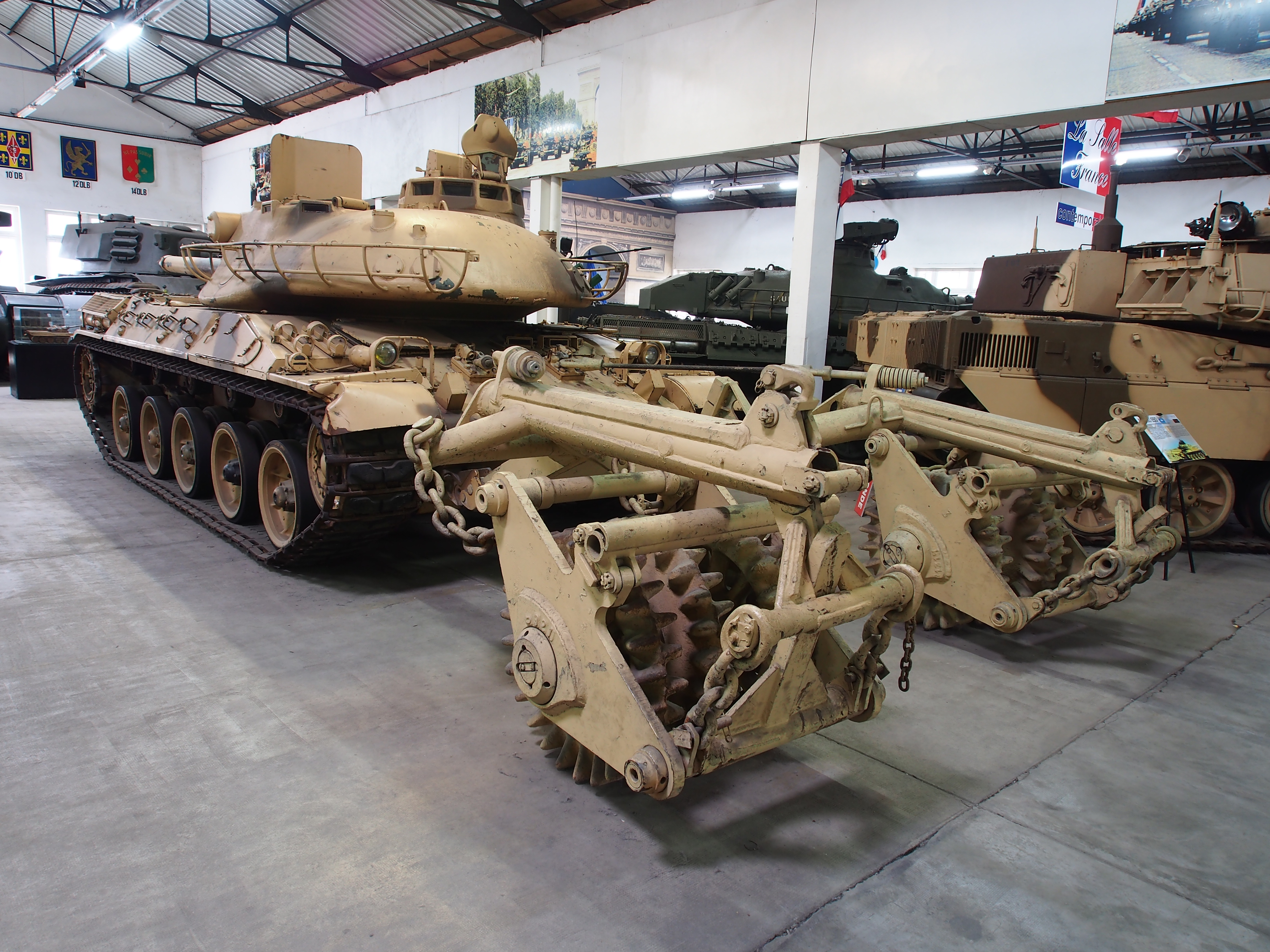
One of the six AMX 30 Demin units

=== Athens Polytechnic uprising ===
In the early hours of 17 November 1973, an AMX-30 tank operated by the Greek junta crashed through the gates of the National Technical University of Athens, which had been occupied by protesting students since 14 November. This was the beginning of the final events that ended the Athens Polytechnic uprising and the anti-junta revolt in Greece.

=== Gulf War ===
Qatari AMX-30s saw combat during the Gulf War at the Battle of Khafji, where on 30 January 1991 they counter-attacked in an attempt to retake the city of Khafji from Iraqi forces which had occupied it the night before. During the action, Qatari AMX-30s knocked out three Iraqi T-55s and captured four more. Two Qatari AMX-30s were lost during the battle.

The French participation in the Persian Gulf War, codenamed Opération Daguet, saw the deployment of the 6e Division Légère Blindée ("6th Light Armoured Division"), referred to for the duration of the conflict as the Division Daguet. Most of its armoured component was provided by the AMX-10RCs of the cavalry reconnaissance regiments, but a heavy armoured unit, the 4e Régiment de Dragons ("4th Dragoon Regiment") was also sent to the region with a complement of 44 AMX-30B2s. Experimentally, a new regimental organisational structure was used, with three squadrons of thirteen tanks, a command tank and six reserve vehicles, instead of the then normal strength of 52 units. Also six older AMX-30Bs were deployed, fitted with Soviet mine rollers provided by Germany from East German stocks, and named AMX 30 Demin. The vehicles were all manned by professional crews, without conscripts. The Daguet Division was positioned to the West of the Coalition forces, to protect the left flank of the U.S. XVIII Airborne Corps. This disposition gave the French commander greater autonomy, and also lessened the likelihood of encountering Iraqi T-72s, which were superior both to the AMX-10RCs and the AMX-30B2s. With the beginning of the ground offensive of 24 February 1991, French forces moved to attack its first target, "Objective Rochambeau", which was defended by a brigade from the Iraqi 45th Infantry Division. A raid by Gazelle helicopters paved the way for an attack by the 4e Régiment de Dragons. Demoralized by heavy coalition bombardments, the Iraqi defenders rapidly surrendered. The following day, the 4e Dragons moved on to their next objective, "Chambord", where they reported destroying ten tanks, three BMPs, fifteen trucks and five mortars with the assistance of USAF A-10s, and capturing numerous prisoners. The final objective was the As-Salman air base ("Objective White"), that was reported captured by 18:15, after a multi-pronged attack, with the 4e Dragons attacking from the south. In all, the AMX-30s fired 270 main gun rounds.

=== Houthi–Saudi Arabian conflict ===
In 2015, Saudi Arabia's AMX-30s and M1 Abrams tanks deployed along the border with Yemen. Two were lost.

== Operators ==
=== Current operators ===
- Cyprus: 52 AMX-30B2 in service. 61 AMX-30Gs have been retired from service.
- Nigeria: 16 units; in storage.
- Saudi Arabia: Saudi Arabian Army acquired 290 AMX-30S, 57 AMX-30D ARVs and 12 AMX-30H armoured bridgelayers between 1976 and 1982. 140 in service as of 2024.
- Venezuela: 82 AMX-30B and 4 AMX-30D ARVs purchased from France between 1973 and 1974. They were upgraded to the AMX-30V2 standard in 2019 and 81 remain in service.

=== Former operators ===
- Bosnia and Herzegovina: 36 AMX-30B received from UAE as aid in 1997. No longer in service, but they are confirmed to be in storage, in a military storage in Tuzla, Solina district.
- Chile: 42 AMX-30B and 10 AMX-30D ARVs purchased from France between 1981 and 1999. Put into reserve in 2004 (current status unknown).
- France
- Greece: 185 AMX-30B and 14 AMX-30D ARVs purchased from France between 1971 and 1978;
- Ba'athist Iraq: 5 AMX-30D delivered in 1981, 21 AMX-30R SAM (out of a total of 127 Roland launchers) and 85 AMX AuF1 delivered in 1983/1985. No longer operational, and out of usage in the Iraqi Army.
- Kuwait: Many tanks were destroyed by Iraq during the Gulf war
- Qatar: In 1977, Qatar ordered 30 AMX-30Bs and 24 additional AMX-30B2s in 1987. 30 units were in service in 2019 alongside 32 Leopard 2A7+. Most likely retired into storage as of 2024.
- Spain: 299 AMX-30E purchased between 1970 and 1983.
- United Arab Emirates: 64 AMX-30B and 4 AMX-30D ARVs purchased from France between 1981 and 1983. Retired into storage.

== Sources ==
- Berthemy, Hubert (2000). "La Cavalerie Française en 2002". Tank Museum News (in French). No. 60 third trimester. Brussels: L'A.S.B.L. "Tank Museum".
- Biass, Eric H.; Doug Richardson (1 June 2003). "Time for Shifting Gears?" (PDF). Armada International. Archived from the original (PDF) on 25 February 2009.
- Bishop, Chris (2006). The Encyclopedia of Tanks and Armored Fighting Vehicles: From World War I to the Present Day. San Diego, CA: Thunder Bay. ISBN 978-1-59223-626-8.
- Caiti, Pierangelo (1978). Modern Armour: The World's Battle Tanks Today. London: Arms and Armour Press. ISBN 0-85368-412-X.
- Chant, Cristopher (1996). World Encyclopaedia of the Tank: An International History of the Armoured Fighting Machine. Somerset: Patrick Stephens Limited. ISBN 1-85260-114-0.
- Cogan, Charles (2001). The Third Option, The Emancipation of European Defense, 1989–2000. Westport, USA: Praeger. ISBN 0-275-96948-7.
- Cordesman, Anthony H.; Burke, Arleigh A. (30 October 2001). Saudi Arabia Enters the 21st Century: The Military and International Security Dimension, IV. The Saudi Army. Center for Strategic and International Studies. ISBN 978-0-275-97997-3.
- Crow, Duncan; Robert J. Icks (1975). Encyclopedia of Tanks. London, United Kingdom: Barrie & Jenkins. ISBN 0-214-20080-9.
- de Mazarrasa, Javier (1994). Blindados en España 2ª Parte: La Dificil Postguerra 1939–1960 (in Spanish). Valladolid, Spain: Quiron Ediciones. ISBN 84-87314-10-4.
- de Mazarrasa, Javier (1990). Carro de Combate AMX-30E (in Spanish). Aldaba Ediciones. ISBN 84-86629-29-2.
- Dunstan, Simon (2003). Chieftain Main Battle Tank 1965–2003. Osprey Publishing. ISBN 978-1-84176-719-2.
- Ferrari, Giorgio (October 1988). "The "Hows" and "Whys" of Armour Penetration". Military Technology (10/1988). Moench Verlagsgesellschaft Mbh.
- Christopher F. Foss (1976). Jane's World Armoured Fighting Vehicles. Macdonald and Jane's Publishers Limited. ISBN 0-354-01022-0.
- Foss, Christopher F. (1986). Jane's Main Battle Tanks (2 ed.). Jane's Publishing Company Limited. ISBN 0-7106-0372-X.
- Foss, Christopher F. (4 January 2003). Great Book of Tanks: The World's Most Important Tanks from World War I to the Present Day. Zenith Press. ISBN 978-0-7603-1475-3.
- Foss, Christopher F. (2005). Jane's Armour and Artillery, 2005–2006. Jane's Information Group. ISBN 0-7106-2686-X.
- Foss, Christopher F. (2006). Jane's Tank Recognition Guide. London, United Kingdom: Harper Collins. ISBN 978-0-00-718326-5.
- Gelbart, Marsh (2004). Modern Israeli Tanks and Personnel Carriers 1985–2004. Oxford, United Kingdom: Osprey. ISBN 1-84176-579-1.
- Hilmes, Rolf (January 1, 2001). "Battle Tanks for the Bundeswehr: Modern German Tank Development, 1956–2000". Armor. No. January–February 2001. Fort Knox, KY: US Army Armor Center. ISSN 0004-2420.
- Jerchel, Michael (1995). Leopard 1 Main Battle Tank 1965–1995. Oxford, United Kingdom: Osprey. ISBN 1-85532-520-9.
- Jeudy, Jean-Gabriel (1997). Chars de France (in French). Boulogne: E.T.A.I. ISBN 2-7268-8369-9.
- Lathrop, Richard; John McDonald (2003). M60 Main Battle Tank 1960–91. Oxford, United Kingdom: Osprey. ISBN 1-84176-551-1.
- Mercillon, Patrick H. Les Chars Français du Musée des Blindés (in French). Saumur: Centre de Documentations sur les Engins Blindés.
- Miller, David (2000). The Illustrated Directory of Tanks and Fighting Vehicles: From World War I to the Present Day. Osceola, WI: MBI. ISBN 978-0-7603-0892-9.
- Moncure, John (1 March 1997). "Leclerc: New French Tank, Like the M1A2, Uses Digital Architecture" (PDF). ARMOR magazine. Fort Benning, GA: US Army Armor Center. Archived from the original (PDF) on 18 March 2022.
- Ogorkiewicz, Richard M. (December 1973). AMX-30 Battle Tank. Berkshire, United Kingdom: Profile Publications Ltd. OCLC 54349455.
- Perez-Guerra, Jaime (1 April 1987). "Spanish AMX-30 MBT upgrade program". Jane's International Defence Review. Jane's.
- Perrett, Bryan (1995). Iron Fist: Classic Armoured Warfare Case Studies. London, United Kingdom: Brockhampton Press. ISBN 1-86019-954-2.
- Rottman, Gordon (1993). Armies of the Gulf War. Oxford, United Kingdom: Osprey. ISBN 1-85532-277-3.
- Rudnick, David (April 1976). "Atlantic Relations: Policy Co-ordination and Conflict (The Case of the Leopard Tank)". International Affairs. London, United Kingdom: Royal Institute of International Affairs.
- Scales, Robert H. (1998). Certain Victory: The U.S. Army in the Gulf War. Washington DC, USA: Brassey's. ISBN 1-57488-136-1.
- Senger und Etterlin, Ferdinand von (1990). Tanks of the World – Taschenbuch der Panzer. Koblenz: Bernard & Graefe Verlag. ISBN 3-7637-5871-2.
- Spielberger, Walter (1980). Von der Zugmachine zum Leopard 2 – Geschichte der Wehrtechnik bei Krauss-Maffei (in German). München: Bernard & Graefe Verlag. ISBN 3-7637-5203-X.
- Westermeyer, Paul W. U.S. Marines in Battle: Al-Khafji, 28 January – 1 February 1991 (PDF). Washington D.C., United States of America: History Division, U.S. Marine Corps.
- Zaloga, Steven J. (1979). Modern Soviet Armor: Combat Vehicles of the USSR and Warsaw Pact Today. Edinburgh, United Kingdom: Prentice Hall. ISBN 0-13-597856-4.
- Zaloga, Steven J. (1999). The M47 and M48 Patton Tanks. Oxford, United Kingdom: Osprey. ISBN 1-85532-825-9.
- Zaloga, Steven J. (2004). T-54 and T-55 Main Battle Tanks 1944–2004. Oxford, United Kingdom: Osprey. ISBN 1-84176-792-1.
