= Engin Blindé du Génie =

French armoured engineering vehicle

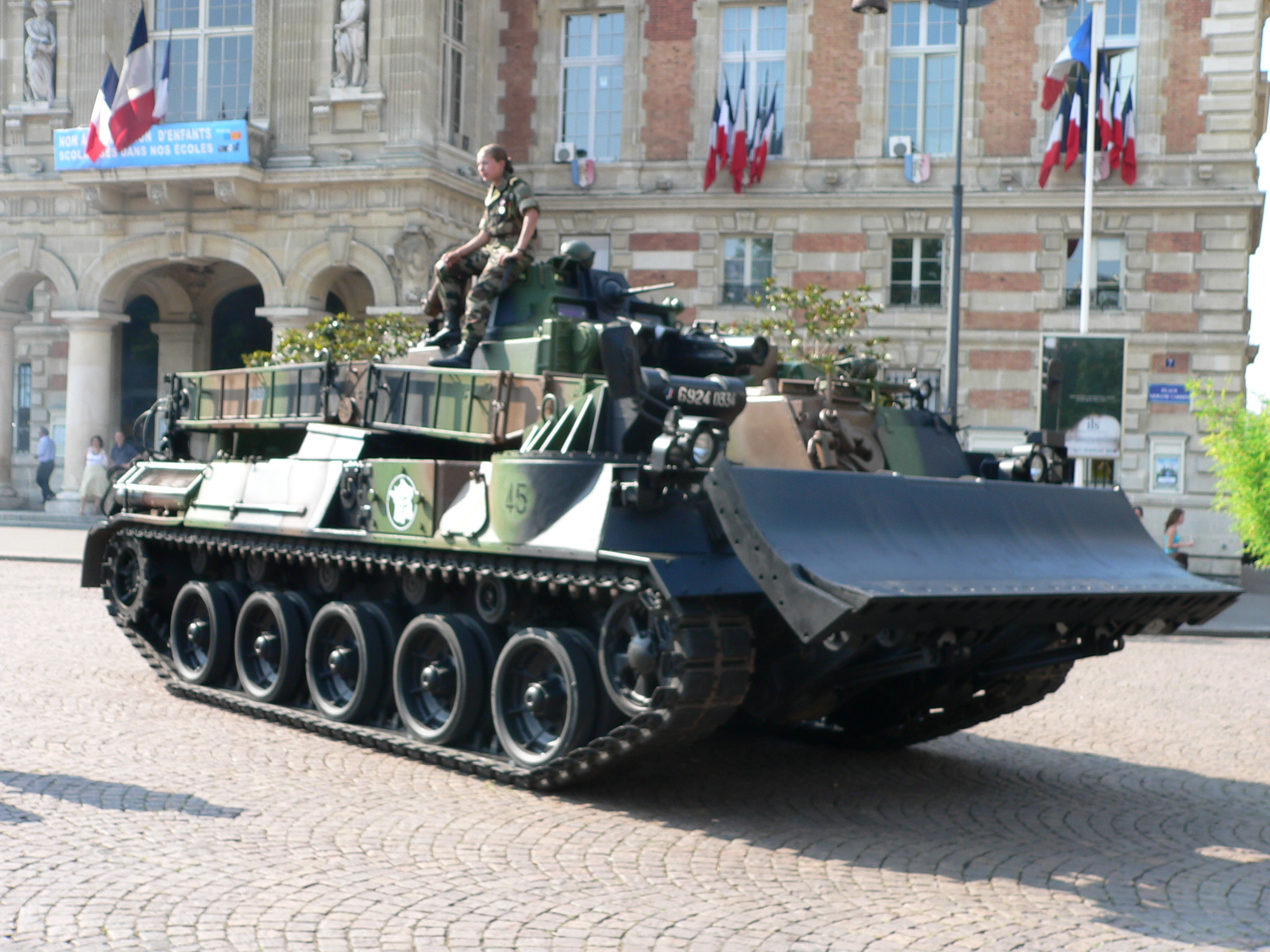

The Engin Blindé du Génie (EBG; "armoured engineering vehicle") is a French military engineering vehicle. Its chassis is that of the AMX-30 battle tank.

Development of the vehicle began in the 1980s. It was pressed into service by the French Army in 1989 for the Gulf War, which revealed that the design needed further work. Deliveries to the French Army resumed in the early 1990s.

The vehicle carries a 142-mm demolition gun, a dozer blade, a manipulator arm, launchers for anti-tank mines, a winch and a 7.62-mm machine gun. It has a three-person crew of a commander, driver and operator. Of 71 vehicles built, 18 of the modernised EBG VAL or EBG R2 variant remained in operational service in 2018, with some others of it in long-term storage.

EBG SDPMAC is a minefield-breaching variant. The EBG VAL or EBG R2 variant has additional armour and other improvements. The most recent variant is the EBG Vulcain, which has an excavator arm instead of a manipulator arm; the first one was delivered in 2020, and three more were due in 2021.
