= Bustle rack =

Type of storage bin

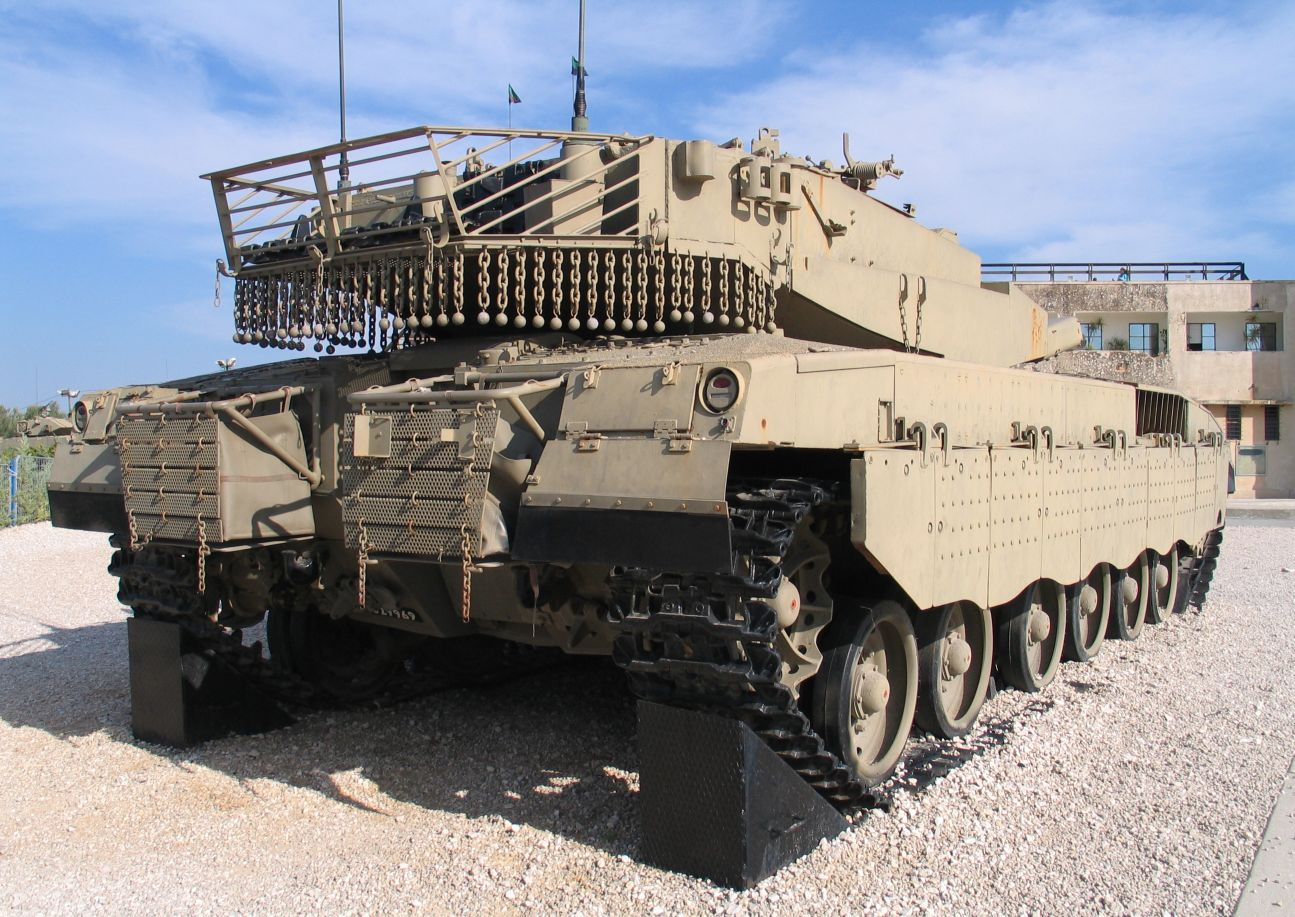
Israeli Merkava III with a bustle rack

A bustle rack is a type of storage bin mounted on combat vehicles, usually on the sides and/or rear of the turret. These racks are used to carry extra gear and supplies for the vehicle in the field, as well as give the crew a place to store their belongings so that they don't take up the already cramped space inside the vehicle.

== On the U.S. Abrams Main Battle Tank ==
The original rack design for the XM1 and first production M1 Abrams tanks was blueprinted by then 1LT John A. Baker III, XO and Company Maintenance Officer, H Co, 2/6 CAV, Ft. Knox, KY. Baker had previously developed the standard combat load plan for M60A1 tanks for the Rapid Deployment Force (RDF), 194th Armored Brigade in the early 1980s. Upon joining the Army's first XM1/M1 unit, H Co, 2/6 CAV, Baker and his platoon tested every aspect of the XM1 seven days a week for months on end, putting the Army's newest battle tank through its paces. Baker and his men became painfully aware that the vehicle's stowage would be significantly inadequate to support crew operations during combat. This motivated the lieutenant to take his platoon's field experiences and draft a simple solution.

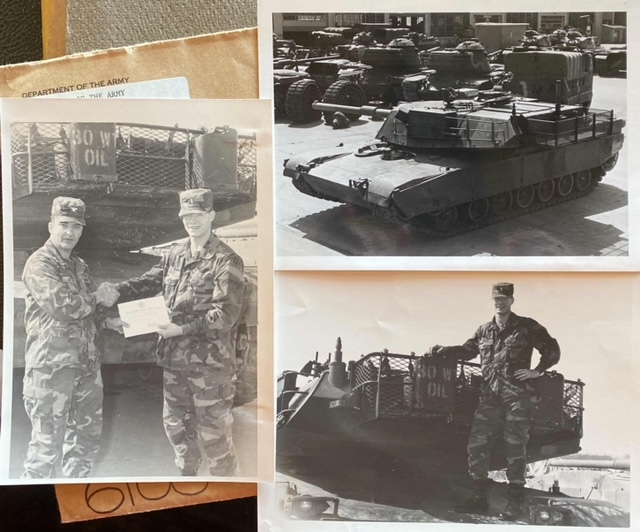
1LT Baker Receives Award from Brigade Cdr and images of 1st prototype version mounted on LREP Tank

Following his stint as platoon leader and the subsequent XO for H Co, Baker began working with the Armor and Engineering Board to draft blueprints of a prototype rack. The advantages of the rack's unique "quick disconnect" design featured the use of standard quick disconnect pins already in use as fasteners on the tank's armored skirts. These pins enabled the easy removal of the bustle rack should it become damaged during combat or training operations.

Removing the handful of lower mounting pins allowed the rack to be "pivoted" onto the blowout panels located on top and to the rear of the turret. Pivoting the rack eliminated interference between the rack and the back deck panel, providing unobstructed access to the tank's power plant during maintenance operations. The rack became widely known around the Army's Armor community as "The Baker Bustle". The rack quickly gained popularity among M1 tankers and the fielded design, though slightly modified by General Dynamics Land Systems, is still the rack seen on M1 series tanks in combat today.

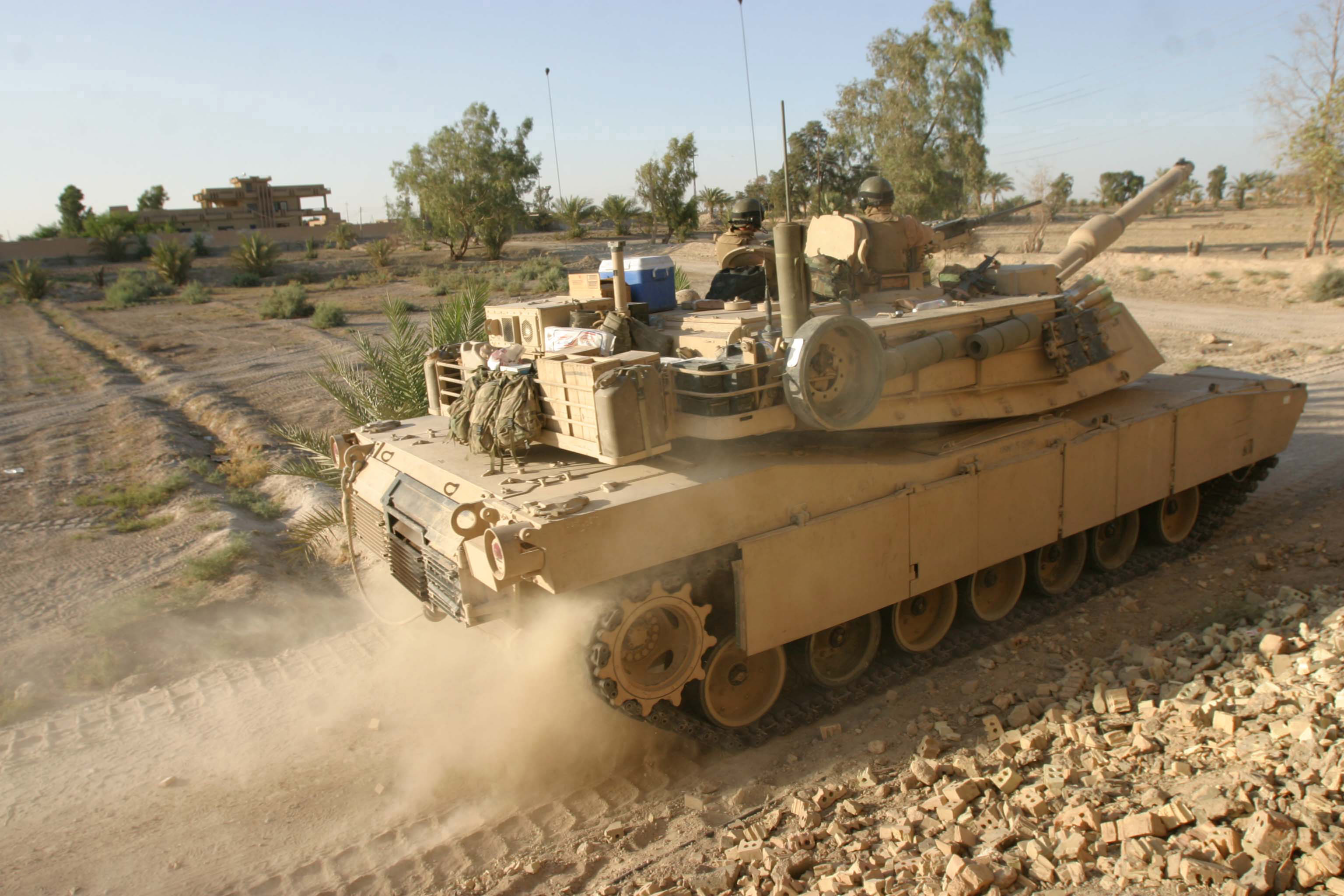
An M1A1 Abrams with a bustle rack and bustle rack extension packed full of gear.

During the Iraq War, some M1 Abrams tanks were fitted with a second bustle rack on the rear of the existing one at the back of the turret. This additional rack is often referred to as a bustle rack extension, or BRE. Some M113s, Bradley Infantry Fighting Vehicles, and the Stryker family of APCs were fitted with similar stowage racks on the sides of the hull.

The bustle rack extensions on the Abrams come in two versions: one with provisions for mounting jerrycans on either end originally used by US Marine Corps Abrams (as seen in the image) and one without, used by U.S. Army Abrams, though the former has begun to replace the latter on Army tanks. M109 self-propelled howitzers in Israeli service have used bustle racks on their front turrets for carrying crewmens' personal equipment for decades.

== Main battle tanks with bustle racks ==
- Al-Zarrar – (Pakistan)
- AMX 30 – (France)
- Centurion – (United Kingdom)
- FV4030/4 Challenger 1 – (United Kingdom)
- FV4201 Chieftain – (United Kingdom)
- K1 88-Tank – (South Korea)
- K2 Black Panther – (South Korea)
- Leopard 1 – (Germany)
- Leopard 2 – (Germany)
- M1 Abrams – (United States)
- MBT-70 – (United States)
- Merkava III – (Israel)
- Type 96 – (China)
