= Canon d'assaut Lorraine =

- Type: Tank destroyer/Assault gun
- Place of origin: France

Specifications
- Mass: 25 metric tonnes
- Length: 10.80 m (35 ft 5 in)
- Width: 3.30 m (10 ft 10 in)
- Height: 2.60 m (8 ft 6 in)
- Crew: 5
- Main armament: 100 mm SA 47
- Secondary armament: 1x 20 mm machine gun
- Engine: Maybach HL 295 12 cylinders 850 hp
- Suspension: torsion bar
- Maximum speed: 62 km/h

The Canon d'assaut Lorraine was a French tank destroyer and assault gun, designed upon the chassis of the AMX M4 project.

== History ==
After the Second World War, the French Army issued various projects to replace their obsolete tanks.

The Lorraine company was tasked with producing a light tank destroyer derived from the AMX-50 project.

== Description ==
=== Armament ===
A 100mm SA 47 L/58 was to be equipped on the tank. The elevation of the gun is -6° to +16°. Ammunition was 40 rounds.

=== Engine ===
The Canon d’Assaut Lorraine featured Veil-Picard pneumatic tires in place of road wheels which lowered the ground pressure of the vehicle. Another advantage of the tires is that the vehicle can still move if the tracks are damaged.

== Development ==
The prototype was under construction in 1950 but was not completed until 1952. In 1953, the project was terminated. The Canon d’Assaut Lorraine would later form the basis for the Lorraine 40t and Lorraine 155 mm projects.
