= Lorraine 155 mm =

- Type: Self-propelled artillery
- Place of origin: France

Specifications
- Mass: 30.30 metric tonnes
- Length: 8.20 m (26 ft 11 in)
- Width: 3.28 m (10 ft 9 in)
- Height: 3.23 m (10 ft 7 in)
- Main armament: Obusier de 155 mm Modèle 50 howitzer
- Secondary armament: 1 × 20 mm MG 151/20 air defence autocannon
- Engine: Maybach HL 230 engine 685 hp
- Suspension: torsion bar
- Maximum speed: 62 km/h (39 mph)

The Lorraine 155 mm was a French prototype self-propelled gun built in 1950

== History ==
After the end of the Second World War, the French Army began to rebuild their army. Various projects were issued to the French Industry to create modern armored fighting vehicles.

In the 1950s, the Lorraine company presented two self-propelled artillery prototypes based on their previous project, the Canon D’Assaut Lorraine. The two vehicles were equipped with a 155mm howitzer.

The first prototype had the casemate placed in the middle of the vehicle.

The second prototype had the casemate mounted in the front.

=== Armament ===
The Obusier de 155 mm Modèle 50 was mounted on the Lorraine 155 mm. The two prototypes were also equipped with a 20 mm MG 151/20 autocannon in the rear of the vehicle to defend itself against air attacks.

=== Chassis ===
The 2 prototypes of the Lorraine 155 mm utilized the chassis from the Canon D’Assaut Lorraine tank destroyer. Similar to the Canon D’Assaut Lorraine, the two prototypes had the Veil Picard pneumatic tires for road wheels. This would enable the vehicle to move in case the tracks were disabled.

=== Engine ===
A Talbot engine was planned to be mounted on the vehicle. In 1951, the Maybach engine was equipped instead.

== Development ==
In 1954, there were ongoing studies for a self-propelled gun with a turret to allow for more flexibility when attacking. In 1955, the order was given to create self-propelled gun with a turret. This was the Batignolles-Châtillon 155mm. The Lorraine 155 mm project was deemed to be redundant and all works on the project was discontinued.

One prototype is stored in Bourges Technical Establishment storage area. The other prototype is kept in the technical zone of the base of the 2nd Dragoon Regiment at Fontevraud.
