= Batignolles-Chatillon Char 25T =

Batignolles-Châtillon Char 25T
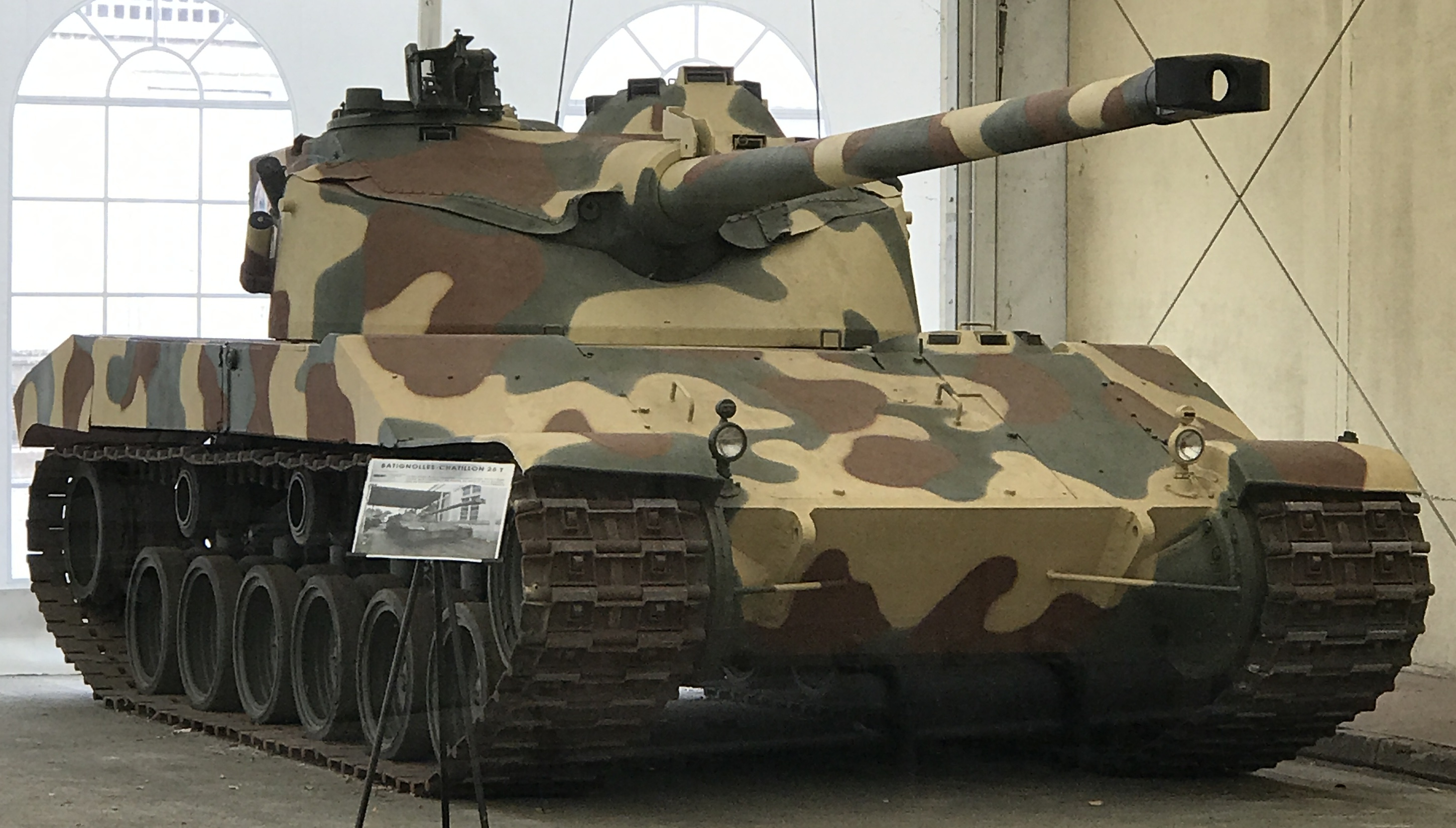
- Restored Batignolles-Châtillon CB2 prototype at Musée des Blindés.
- Type: Medium tank
- Place of origin: France

Production history
- Designer: Batignolles-Châtillon
- Designed: 1954

Specifications
- Mass: 25.375 tonnes (in combat order): Armor and fittings: 6,300 kg; Undercarriage and suspension: 5,610 kg; Engine: 635 kg; Transmission (clutch - gearbox and reducer): 1,350 kg; Lot fittings - electrical installation: 1,390 kg; Complete turret (16 shells of 90mm): 8,470 kg; Petrol - ammunition (36 shells of 90mm): 1,220 kg
- Length: 5.67 m
- Width: 3.16 m
- Height: 2.37 m
- Crew: 4
- Armor: 20-50 mm(0.7-1.9 in)
- Main armament: 90 mm D.911 APX gun
- Secondary armament: 1 7.5 mm coaxial machine gun electro-mechanical firing (lever control on the pointer's vertical aiming wheel) 1 reproached 7.5mm defense machine gun
- Engine: Gasoline, Brand "Moteur Moderne", Type 3.M-27, 3 vertical cylinders, 2 stroke, suppressor ignition system, displacement: 8250mm3, cooling system: water, radiator: cooled by air ejector operating by means of exhaust gases. 500hp at 2700 rpm
- Power/weight: 20hp/t
- Suspension: Hydraulic suspension, Four torsion bars, Undercarriage: 6 double rollers - fitted on each side with rubber tires - (580mm x 140mm), Shock absorbers: on the 8 extreme rollers, Track tension: by rear pulley - all-steel track.
- Fuel capacity: 700L
- Maximum speed: 65 km/h (40 mph)
- Steering system: ensured by a differential system allowing turning on the spot

The Batignolles-Châtillon Char 25T was an early Cold War medium tank of France, developed in 1954 by the Batignolles-Châtillon company. The vehicle was not developed beyond the two prototypes.

== Development ==
It was designed for a 25-ton weight class, which is nearly twice the weight of the AMX-13. Its primary armament was a 90 mm cannon, and was operated by 4 crew members. Its speed could reach 65 km/h (40 mph). Two prototypes were made before it was set aside. However, some principles of creation of the tank and some of its technology were used in other French AFVs. Some variants were developed, but none of these were ever used in active service with the French Army.

== Design ==
The Char 25T was designed around the gun and mobility so therefore little to no importance was put on the armor. The armor was very thin, being 50 mm at its thickest point, and only intended to protect against heavy machine guns, as that was enough considering the role of the tank being focused on hit-and-run tactics.

The tank was supposed to get up to 65 km/h (40 mph) on the road with a 40 km/h (25 mph) cruising speed.

=== Turret and fire-control ===
The turret was of the oscillating type and consisted of two pieces. The bottom part functioned as the base of the turret, which also contained the turret ring which moved the turret horizontally, while the top part (containing the cannon) was joined by a hinge and was capable of moving up and down to elevations of -6˚/+13˚.

The tank was equipped with a total of 16 periscopes and one fixed binocular. The tank commander was also fitted with a priority device using which he could take control of the cannon from the gunner in case he needed to engage a target urgently without time for the gunner to respond or if the gunner was incapacitated.

=== Armament ===
The main gun was a 90 mm D.911 APX gun fed by an automatic loader. It used the same ammunition as the T119 gun used in the American M47 Patton (later designated 90 mm M36) but with a longer barrel, resulting in a higher muzzle velocity of 930 m/s (3,100 ft/s) with a 10.91 kg (24.1 lb) projectile, giving better range and armor penetration with kinetic ammunition. The total amount of main ammunition that was stored inside the tank totaled to 52 shells, 16 of which were found in the turret.

The tank was also equipped with two 7.5 mm machine guns for close range anti infantry fire and/or estimating the range to the enemy target, as well as four smoke grenade launchers (two on each side) which could be deployed for extra shielding while retreating from a difficult situation.

== Surviving examples ==
There were at least 2 prototypes of the Char 25T of which one is at the Musée des Blindés in Saumur, France. The fate of the other prototype is yet unknown.

== See also ==
- AMX-13
- AMX-30
- AMX ELC
- AMX-10P
