= Lorraine 40t =

- Type: Medium Tank
- Place of origin: France

Specifications
- Mass: 39.7 metric tonnes
- Length: 10.80 m (35 ft 5 in)
- Width: 3.30 m (10 ft 10 in)
- Height: 2.85 m (9 ft 4 in)
- Crew: 4 (commander, gunner, driver, loader/radio)
- Armor: 30-45 mm
- Main armament: 100 mm SA 47
- Secondary armament: 1 x 7.5 mm coaxial machine gun and 1 x 7.5 mm machine gun on roof
- Engine: Maybach HL 295 12VC; 850 hp
- Suspension: torsion bar
- Operational range: 300 km
- Maximum speed: 60 km/h (37 mph)

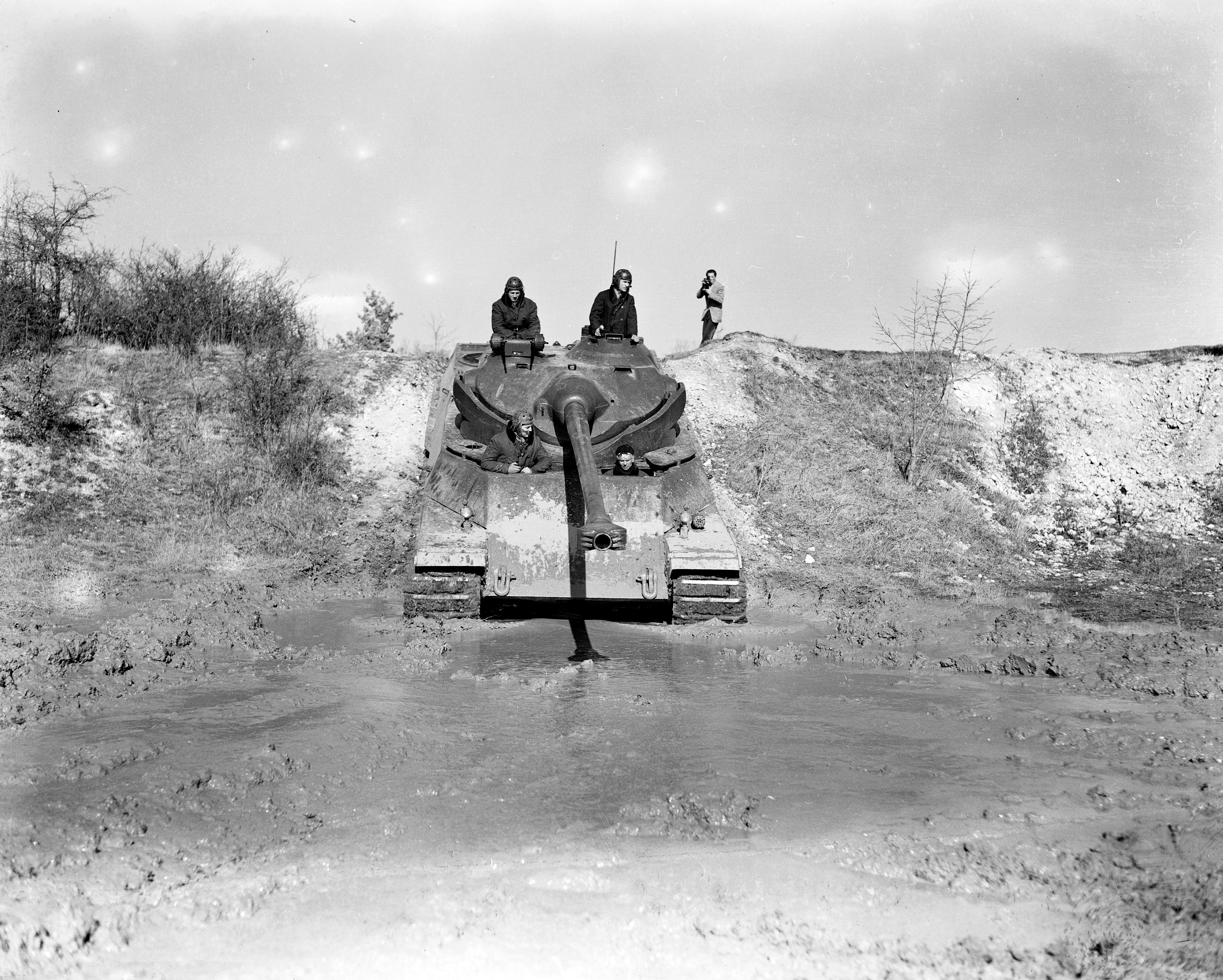
Here is a AMX-50 in a creek. The AMX-50 was similar to the Lorraine 40t.

The Lorraine 40t was a prototype French medium tank of the Cold War.

== Development ==
After the end of the Second World War, the French Army was in pressing need of a modern tank with heavy armament. In March 1945, French industry was invited to design a tank, which resulted in the AMX-50.

However, it was already obvious in the early 1950s that the AMX-50 tank might turn out to be too heavy due to attempts to improve the gun and armor in response to Soviet tanks such as the IS-3. Thus, in 1950, a 40 tonne medium tank project was started. The Lorraine company built a medium tank prototype based on their earlier Canon D’Assaut Lorraine project.

== Description ==
The total weight was limited to 39.7 tonnes. The Lorraine 40t featured a pike nose design similar to the IS-3. It had an oscillating turret like the AMX-50. The Lorraine 40t mounted a 100 mm SA 47 gun fed from a drum autoloader similar to that of the AMX-50 project.

The vehicle inherited the Veil Picard pneumatic tires from the Canon D’Assaut Lorraine which helped to reduce weight. The engine used was the Maybach HL 295 12VC engine which gave a speed of 60 km/h (37 mph).

The Lorraine 40t had a SCR 508 radio for external communications.

The two prototypes were apparently scrapped after the discontinuation of the project.
