= Patagón =

VC Tan Patagón
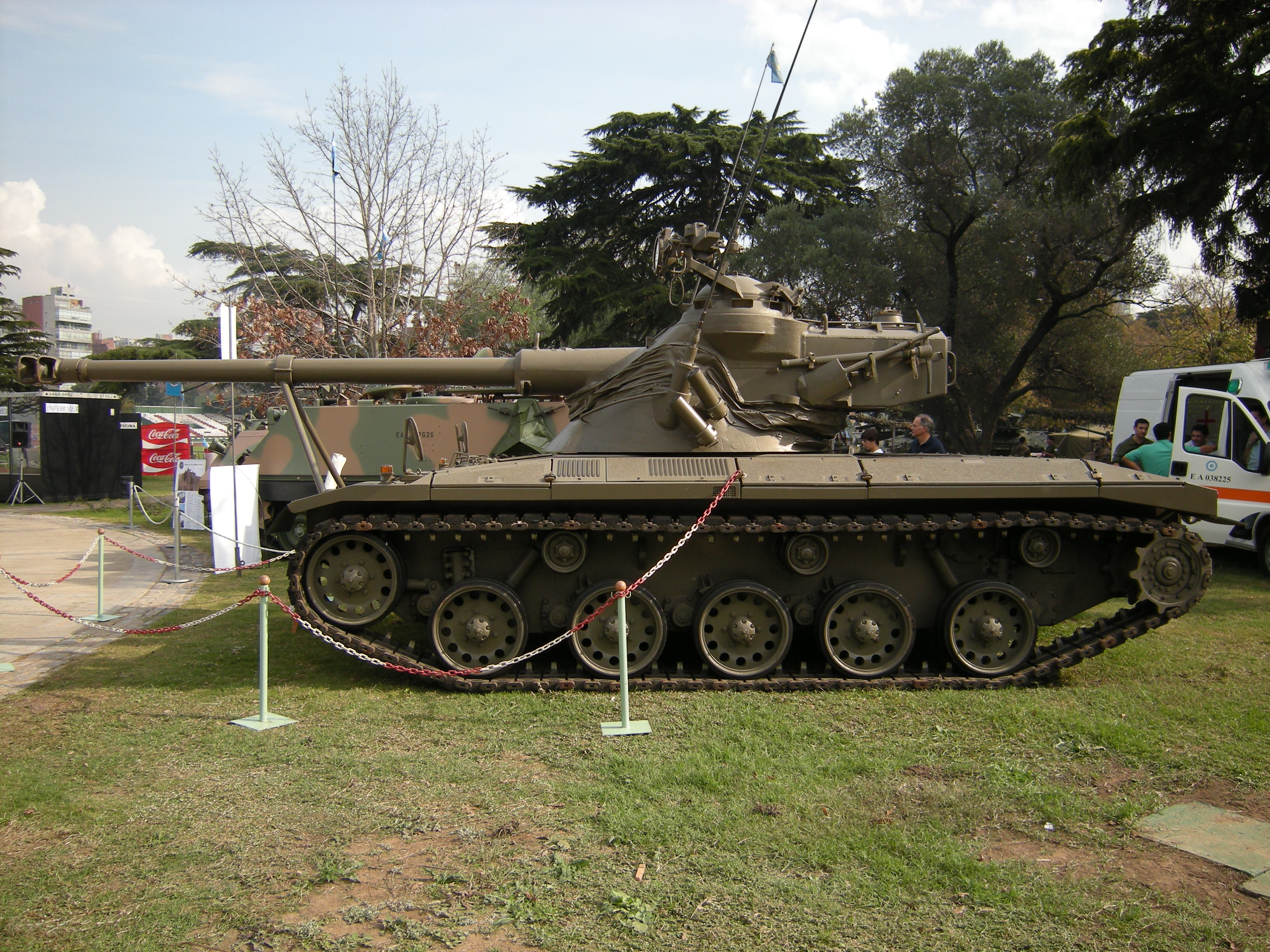
- A "Patagón" tank at the Argentine Army Exhibition, May 2008
- Type: Light tank
- Place of origin: Argentina

Service history
- Used by: Argentina

Production history
- Designed: early 2000s
- No. built: 5 (including 1 prototype)

Specifications
- Mass: 16.5 tonnes (18.2 short tons; 16.2 long tons)
- Length: 5.582 m (18 ft 3.8 in)
- Width: 2.5 m (8 ft 2 in)
- Height: 2.88 m (9 ft 5 in) (Note: Data for SK-105, assumed unchanged for Patagón.)
- Crew: 3 (Commander, gunner, driver)
- Armor: base: 8 mm (0.31 in) maximum: 40 mm (1.6 in) (Note: Data for SK-105, assumed unchanged for Patagón.)
- Main armament: 105 mm rifled gun
- Secondary armament: 7.62×51mm NATO co-axial machine gun
- Engine: Steyr 7FA / 6-cylinder diesel engine (Note: Data for SK-105, assumed unchanged for Patagón.); 300 hp (220 kW) (Note: The SK-105 data shows 320 hp, however the placard on the displayed Patagón indicated 300 hp with a similar engine.)
- Power/weight: 18.2 hp / tonne
- Suspension: torsion bar, 5 road wheels
- Operational range: 520 kilometres (320 mi) (Note: The SK-105 data shows 500 km, however the placard on the displayed Patagón indicated 520 km with a similar engine and no indication of increased fuel tankage.)
- Maximum speed: 70 km/h (43 mph) (Note: Same data for both SK-105 and Patagón.)

The "Patagón" tank is a light tank developed in Argentina during the early 2000s, that was expected to enter service with the Argentine Army. It is based on a SK-105 Kürassier chassis with a refurbished AMX-13 turret. The project was cancelled in late 2008 after five tanks were converted.

== Development ==
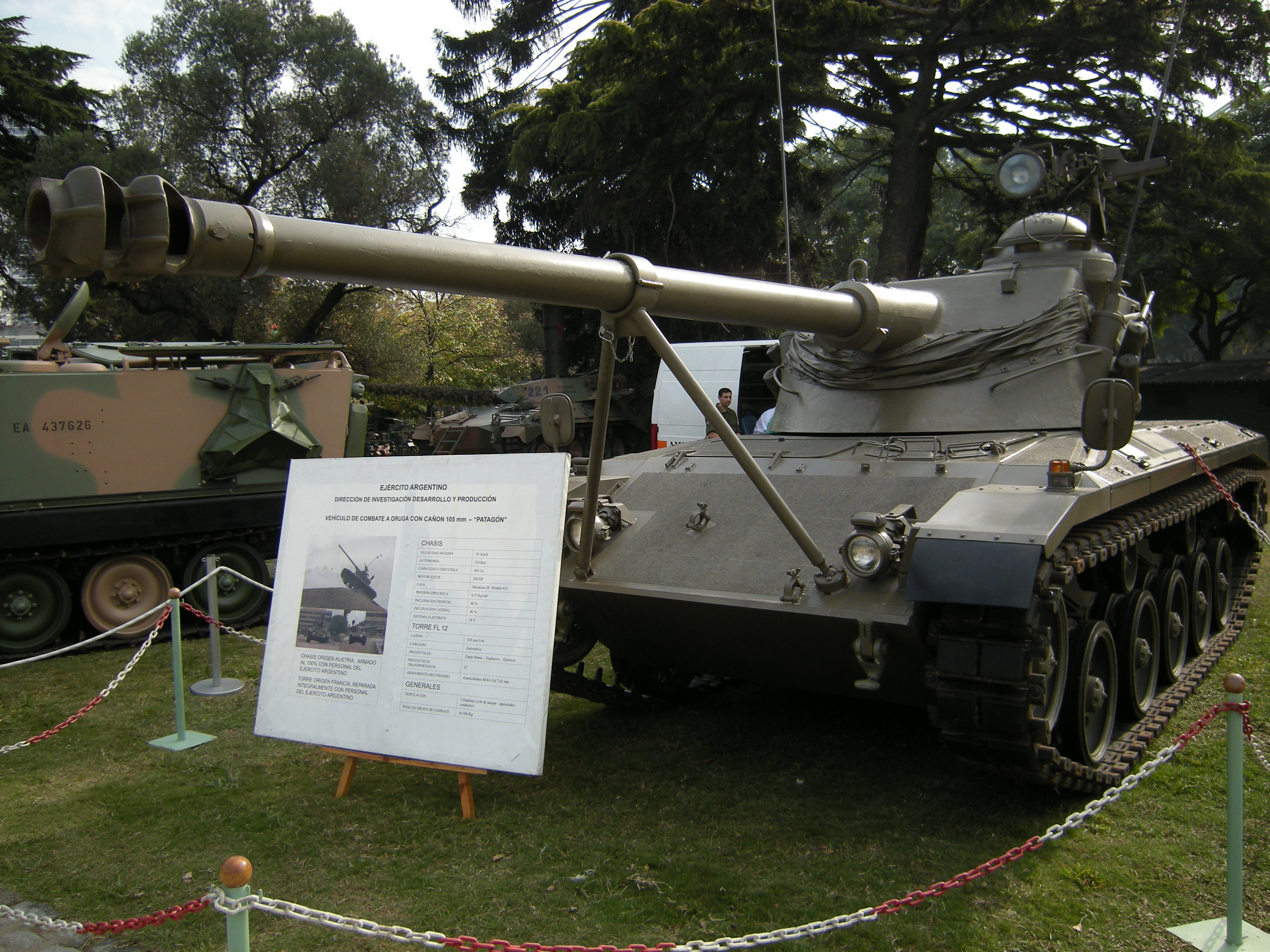
"Patagón" prototype displayed at the Argentine Army Exhibition in May 2008. Note placard with technical data summary.

In 2003 the Argentine Army defined goals for increasing its capabilities, among them nationalizing the manufacturing of its equipment; the VC SK-105 "Patagón" tank upgrade project was part of that effort. It was planned to convert and upgrade up to 40 vehicles at an expected cost of USD 23,4 million in the period 2005-2009; these vehicles were going to be assembled in Comodoro Rivadavia and provided to the army units based in Patagonia.

The vehicle is composed of a SK-105 Kürassier chassis which mounts a refurbished FL-12 oscillating turret armed with a 105 mm gun, obtained from obsolete AMX-13 tanks. Both vehicles were in service with the Argentine Army in the early 2000s. Most of the Patagón technical specifications are similar to the SK-105.

The Patagón prototype was unveiled on 22 November 2005; however the project was cancelled in late 2008, as it was considered uneconomical.

== Production ==
As of late 2014 four units have been completed, in addition to the prototype unveiled in 2005.

== Operators ==
- (Argentina) Argentine Army

== See also ==
- Nahuel DL 43 – Medium tank developed by Argentina during the Second World War.
- Tanque Argentino Mediano - Medium tank developed by Argentina during the 1970s, in use by the Argentine Army since the early 1980s.
