= SK-105 Kürassier =

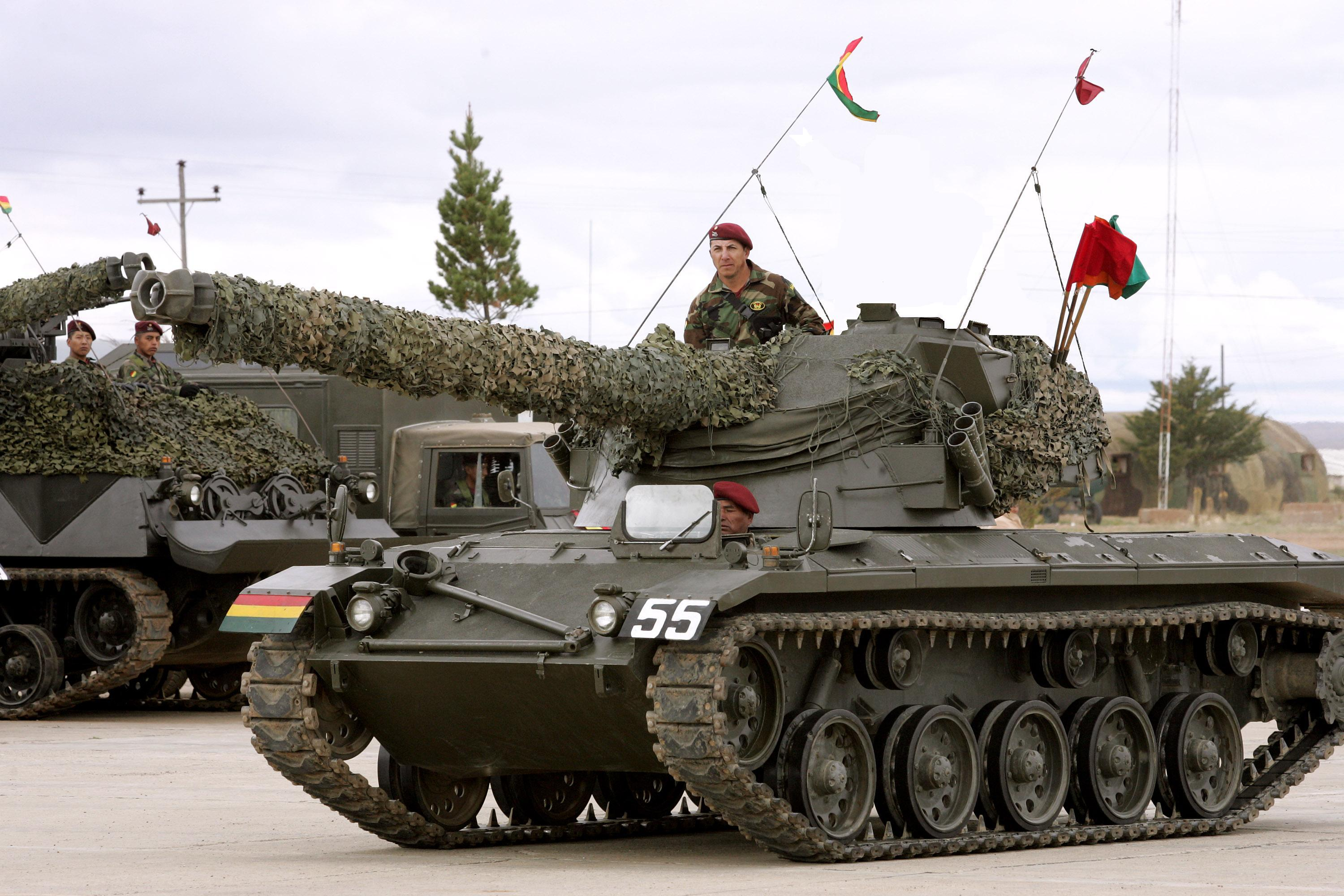
- SK-105 of the Bolivian Army
- Type: Light tank destroyer
- Place of origin: Austria

Service history
- Wars: Western Sahara War; Iran-Iraq War

Production history
- Manufacturer: Saurer-Werk
- Produced: 1971–2001
- No. built: 600–700

Specifications
- Mass: 17.7 tonnes (19.5 short tons; 17.4 long tons)
- Length: 5.58 metres (18 ft 4 in) 7.76 m (25 ft 6 in) w/ main gun
- Width: 2.5 m (8 ft 2 in)
- Height: 2.88 m (9 ft 5 in)
- Crew: 3
- Armor: base: 8 mm (0.31 in) maximum: 40 mm (1.6 in)
- Main armament: SK-105A2: 105 mm CN105G1 rifled gun SK-105A3: 105 mm M68 (tank gun)
- Secondary armament: 7.62×51mm NATO co-axial MG3
- Engine: Steyr 7FA / 6-cylinder diesel engine 320 hp (238 kW)
- Suspension: torsion bar, 5 road wheels
- Operational range: 500 kilometres (310 mi)
- Maximum speed: 70 km/h (43 mph)

The SK-105 Kürassier is an Austrian light tank/tank destroyer armed with a rifled 105 mm gun in an oscillating turret. It is estimated that over 700 have been produced, with initial deliveries in 1971 and hull production ceasing in February 2001. It shares its CN 105-57 main gun with the French AMX-13, which was widely produced and deployed.

SK-105 Kürassier at the Museum of Military History, Vienna

== History ==
=== Design and development ===
The SK-105 was developed by Saurer-Werk (now Steyr-Daimler-Puch) to meet the Austrian Army's operational requirements for a mobile anti-tank vehicle. The first prototype was ready in 1967 and delivery of pre-production vehicles commenced in 1971.

The SK-105 is based on a heavily modified Saurer APC. The hull of the SK-105 is welded steel and is divided into three compartments: driver's at the front, fighting in the centre and the engine at the rear. Due to its low weight, the SK-105 can be transported by C-130 Hercules transport aircraft. The turret of the SK-105 is developed from the French design used on the AMX-13. Its gun can penetrate 360 mm of armour. Front armour protects the crew from 20mm armour-piercing rounds over its frontal arc, while all-round protection is against small arms bullets only. Add-on armour on the front part of the chassis and turret is available as an option, which provides protection against 35 mm APDS rounds at a flank arc. Some export vehicles were fitted with add-on armour.

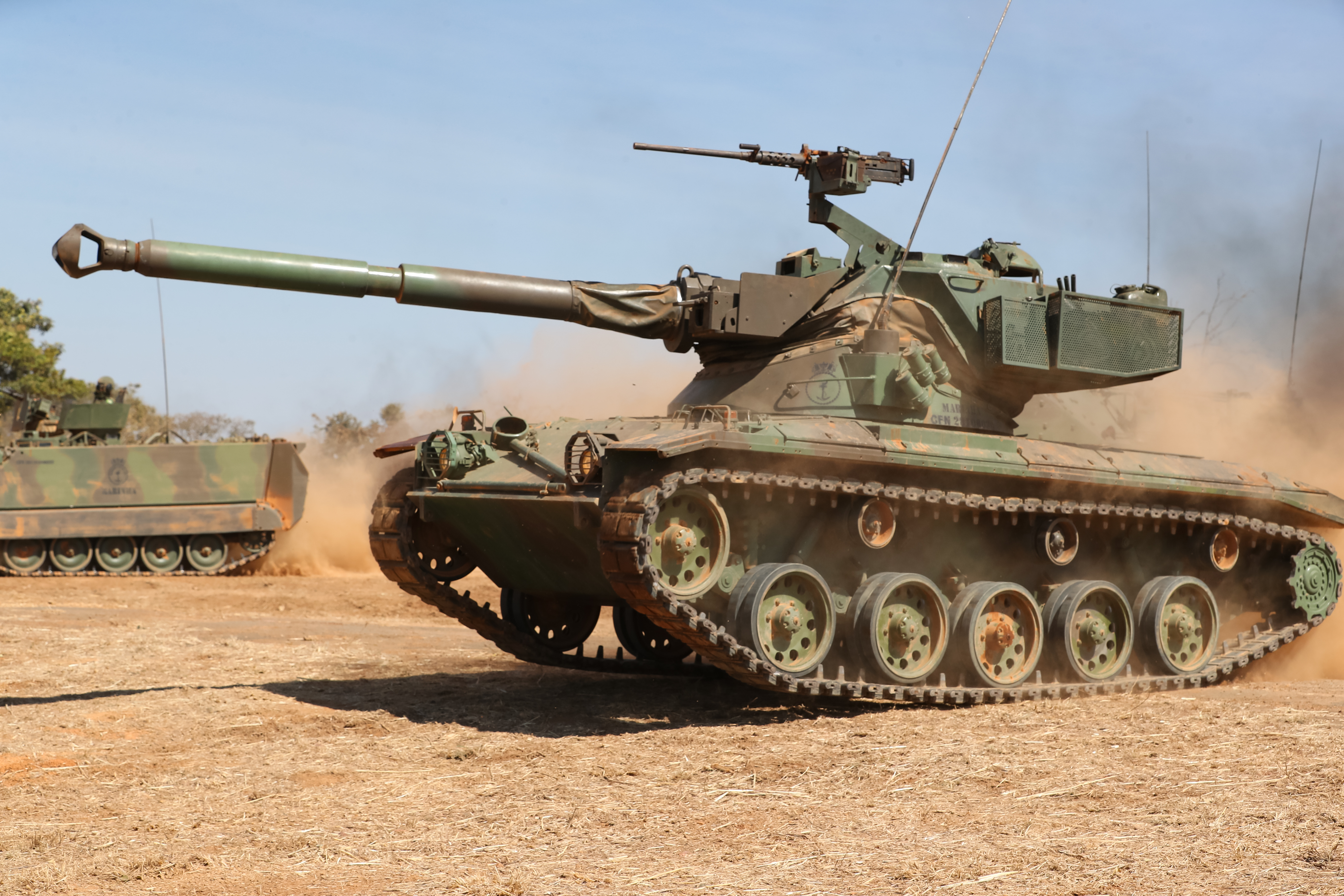
SK-105 in Brazilian service

The driver sits at the front of the vehicle on the left. On the right side of the front section of the hull, there is spare ammo for the main gun. There are three periscopes forward of his hatch cover and in wet weather, a small windscreen with a wiper can be fitted. The driver's centre day driving periscope can be replaced by a passive night vision periscope if required. Ammunition and the vehicle's batteries are stowed to the right of the driver. The engine and transmission are at the rear part of the vehicle and the engine compartment is fitted with a fire extinguisher which can be operated by hand or automatically. Combustion air is drawn in via a cyclone filter system.

The oscillating turret is similar to that fitted to the AMX-13 light tank. The commander is seated on the left of the turret and the gunner on the right. The commander is provided with seven periscopes, a periscopic sight. The commander's infrared night sight has a magnification of x6. The gunner has two observation periscopes, a telescopic sight and a one-piece lifting and swivelling hatch cover. Due to the design of the oscillating turret, all sights are always linked to the main and secondary armament. For engaging targets at night, an infrared periscopic sight is provided for the commander. A CILAS TCV 29 laser range-finder (range of 400 to 9,995 m) is mounted on the roof of the turret. The XSW-30-U 950 W infrared/white light searchlight is fitted on the left front plate of the oscillating part of the turret. A fixed fan in the turret draws out fumes when the main or secondary armament is fired. All versions of the SK-105 have a 105 mm gun designated 105 G1. This gun is completed with a semi-automatic revolving magazine-type autoloader that allowed the reduction of the crew to three members. The vehicle has two revolving magazines holding 6 rounds each. A total of 42 rounds for the main gun are carried. Once the gun is fired the empty cartridge cases are ejected out of the rear of the turret through a trapdoor hinged on the left.

This vehicle is specifically designed for mountainous terrain and has an improved climbing capability compared to heavier main battle tanks.

In 2012, the Austrian Land Forces announced that over two-thirds of their heavy equipment would be disposed by 2014. It was also made clear that SK-105s would also be retired from service to reduce defence expenditures.

In 2014, all production and support rights on SK-105 were acquired from General Dynamics Europe Land System (GDELS) by the Belgian company DUMA Engineering Group. The company is supporting current users of SK-105 and derivatives and offering retrofit programs.

In January 2023, Freddy Versluys, CEO of OIP Sensor Systems, claims to have 112 SK-105s stored in hangars in Tournai, Belgium, "in good condition" and "easily repaired" for potential deployment to Ukraine, but presently unavailable because politicians based in Vienna, Austria, have not so far approved these tanks for re-export.

== Variants ==
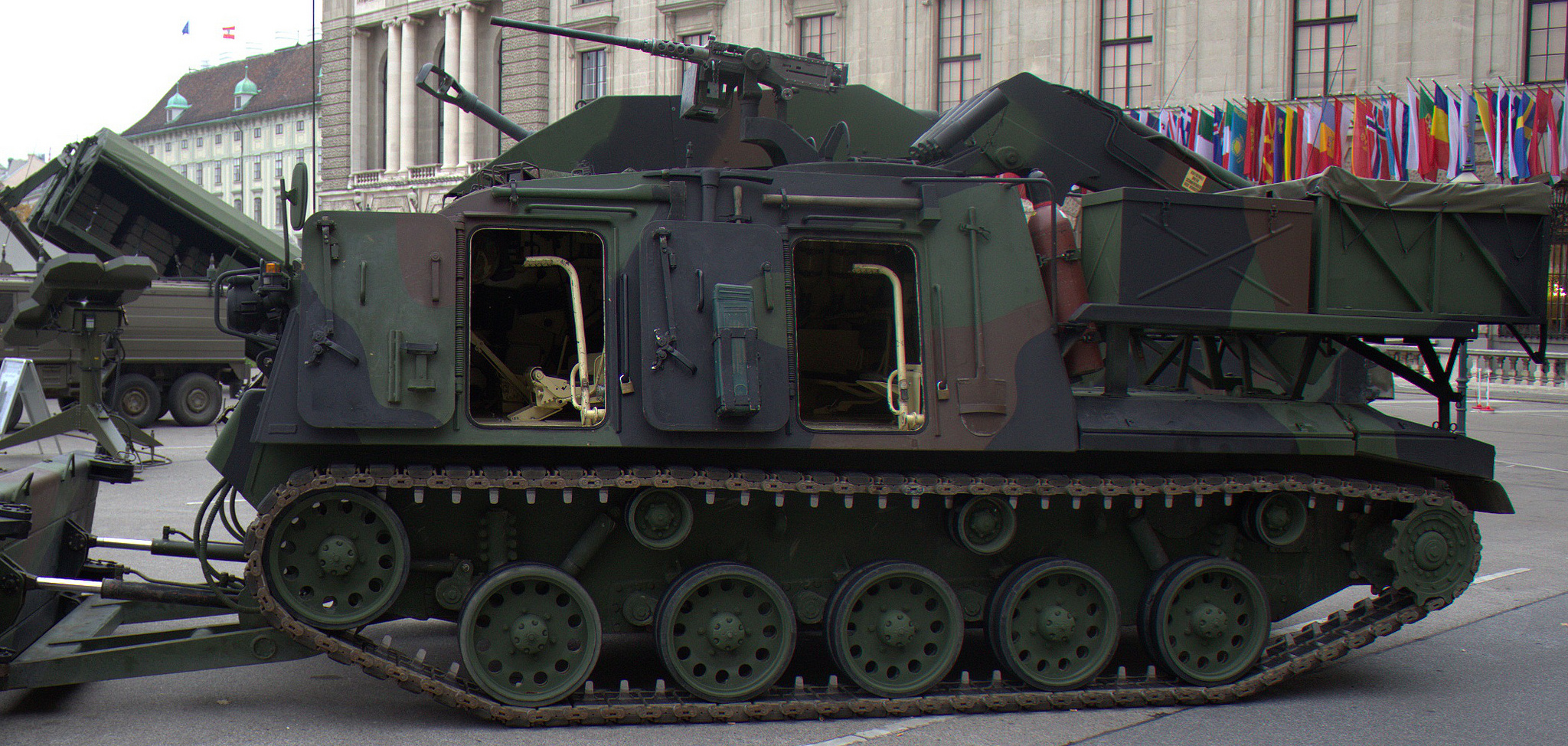
Pionier engineering vehicle "Pionierpanzer A1"

SK-105 Kürassier A1 at the Panzerhalle at the Heeresgeschichtliches Museum, Vienna

SK-105 Kürassier A2 (previously serving in KFOR) at the Panzerhalle at the Heeresgeschichtliches Museum, Vienna

SK-105 Super Kürassier No. 2 at the Panzerhalle at the Heeresgeschichtliches Museum, Vienna

- SK-105 - Base production
- SK-105 A1 - Improved automatic loading system
- SK-105 A2 - Improved version of the A1. It featured a new fire control system and a fully automatic electrical loading system.
- SK-105 A2S - Same as the SK-105 A2 but with an Elbit's Electric gun and turret drive stabilization (EGTDS) for which the "S" stand for Stabilized.
- SK-105 A3 - Limited production of improved version of the SK-105. It featured applique armour on the turret, new fire control system, thermal camera and a new 105 mm M68 tank gun.
- Greif armoured recovery vehicle
- Pionier engineering vehicle
- SK-105 driver training vehicle
- Super Kürassier - 2 prototype variants constructed during the 1980s with a bigger turret. They featured an electronic turret drive and the fire control system from the Leopard 2. The project was terminated in 1988.

=== Patagón derivative ===
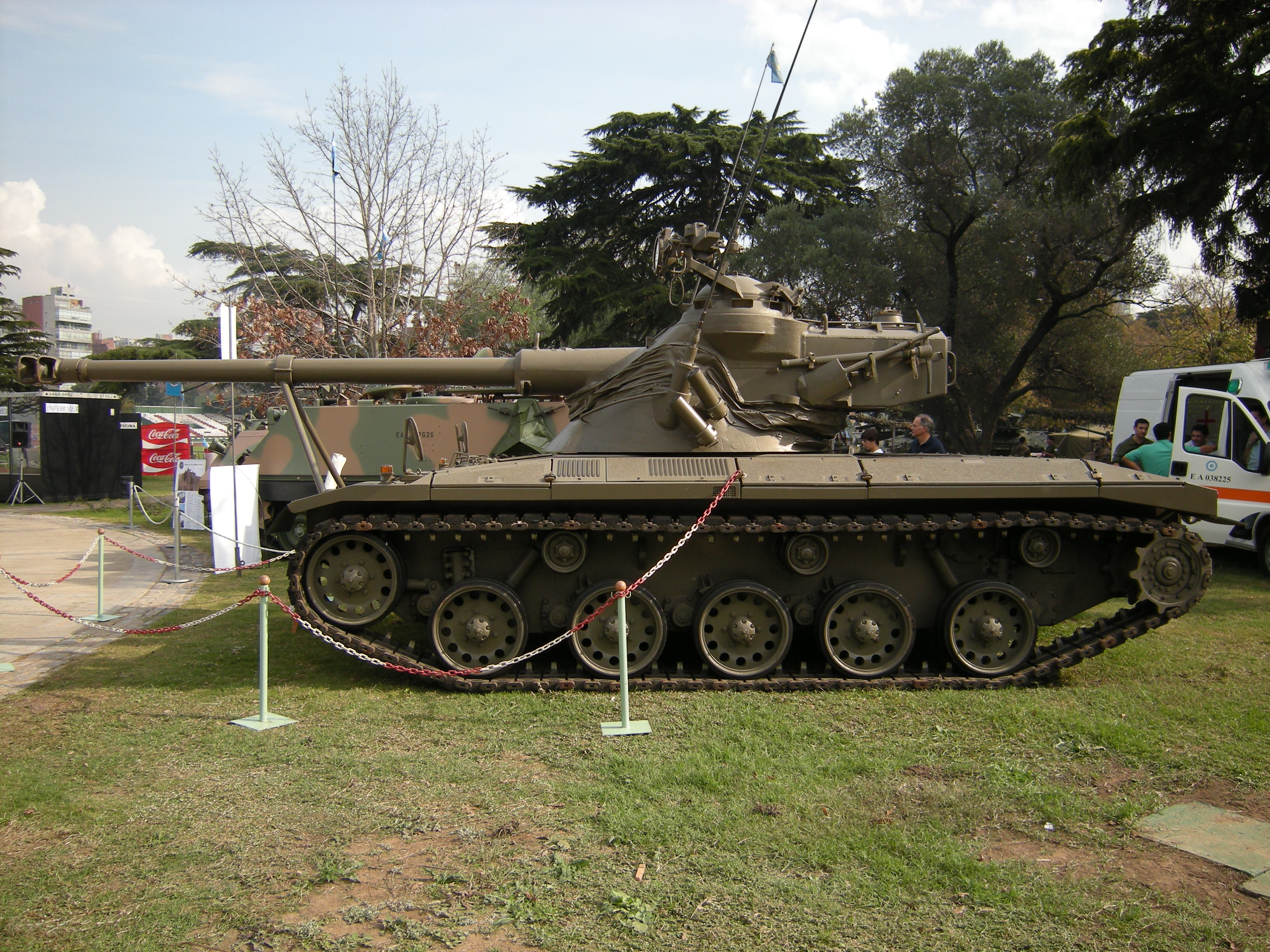
"Patagón" tank at the Argentine Army Exhibition, May 2008.

In 2005, the Argentine Army ordered 9 SK-105 hulls from Austria, which it announced would be retrofitted with the turrets of its surplus AMX-13 tanks. In Argentine service, this variant was designated Patagón. Argentina planned to assemble 39 Patagóns between 2005 and 2009, at an estimated cost of $23.4 million USD. No more hulls were purchased, and only 4 of those Argentina previously acquired for this purpose received the conversion, plus the prototype. The program was shelved due to lack of funds.

== Operators ==
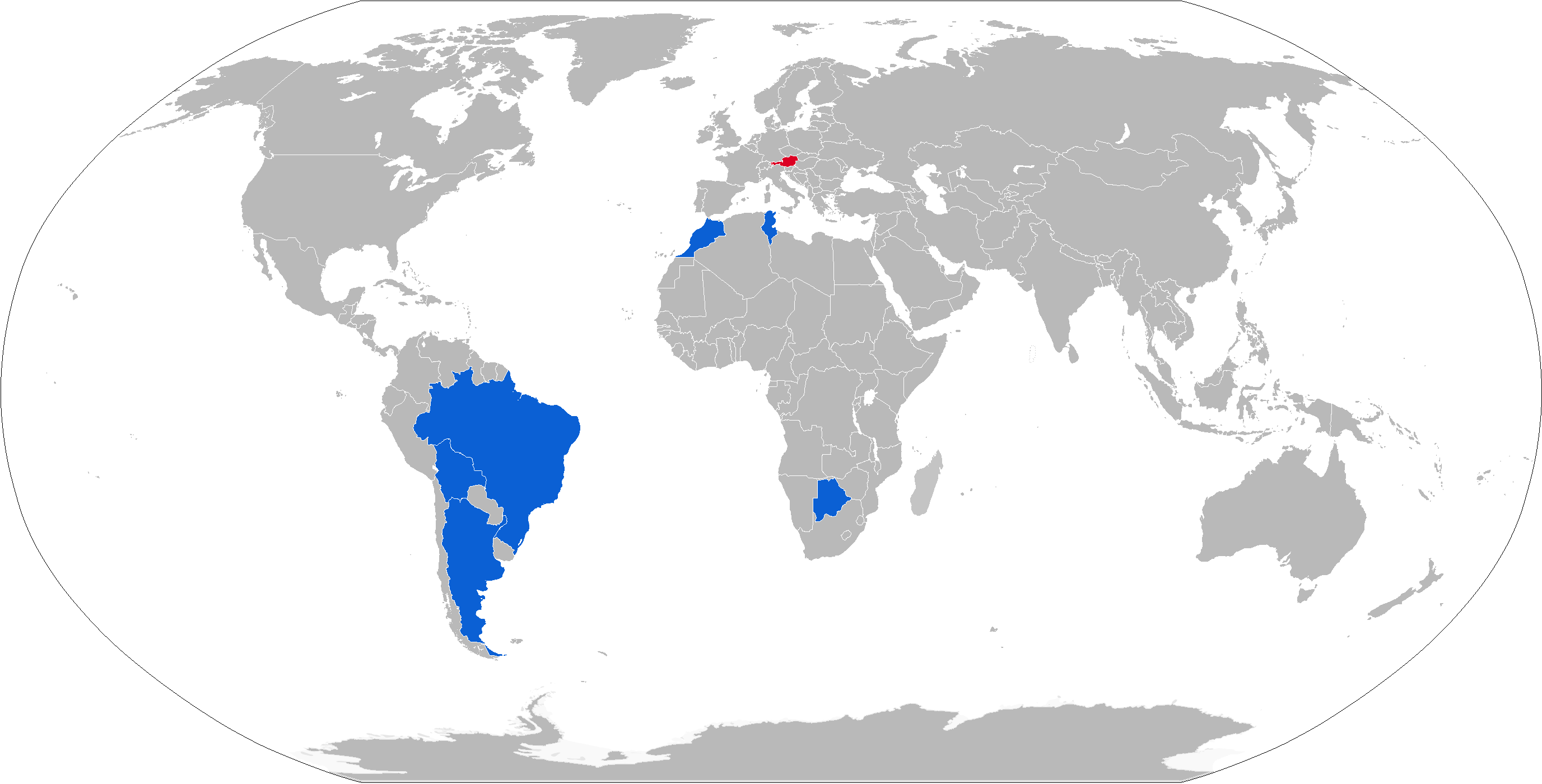
Map of SK-105 operators in blue with former operators in red

- Argentina: 118, excluding the Patagón variant.
- Bolivia: 54
- Botswana: 52
- Greece: 32
- Morocco: 109
- Tunisia: 54

=== Former operators ===
- Austria: 286 (19 Pionier engineering vehicles still in use)
- Brazil: 17 SK-105 A2S ordered in 2001 for the Brazilian Marine Corps. Retired in May 2026.
- Iraq: 100, notably used in the Iran-Iraq War.

== See also ==
Comparable vehicles

- American: M41 Walker Bulldog
- French: AMX-13
- Soviet: PT-76

Other AFVs with oscillating turret

- French: AMX 50
- French: Panhard EBR
