= CN 105-57 =

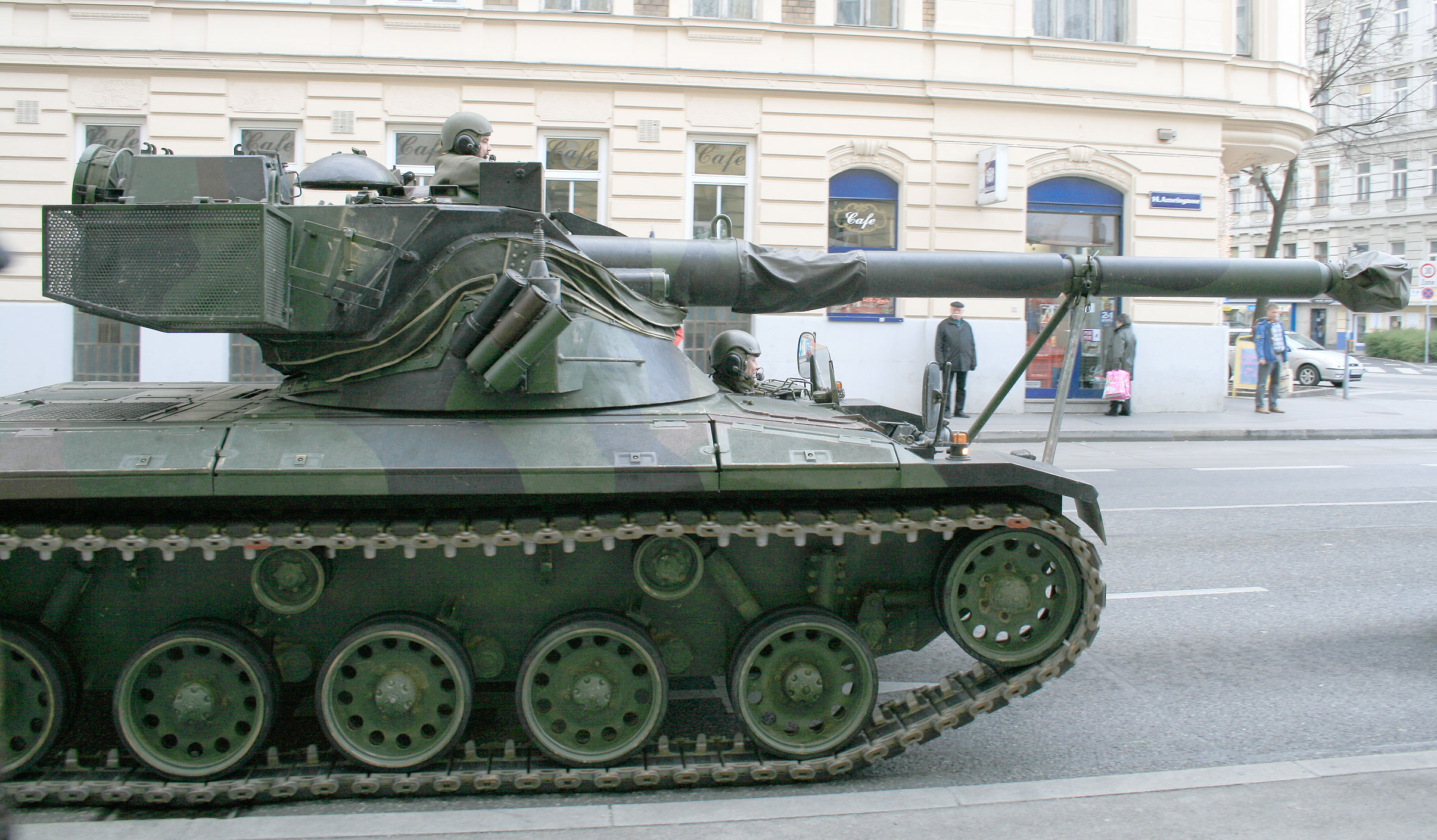
- An Austrian SK-105A2 Kürassier fitted with the CN 105 G1 gun.
- Type: Tank gun
- Place of origin: France

Service history
- In service: 1957–present
- Used by: Austria and the Netherlands

Production history
- Designer: EFAB Bourges
- Designed: 1957
- Manufacturer: arsenal de Bourges (ABS)
- Produced: 1958
- Variants: CN 105 G1

Specifications
- Mass: 1,210 kg (2,670 lb)
- Length: 4.622 m (15 ft 2 in)
- Shell: 105×528mm. R
- Caliber: 105 mm (4.134 in)
- Breech: semi-automatic horizontal sliding-wedge
- Recoil: 368 mm (14.5 in)
- Elevation: -8° to +12°
- Traverse: 360°
- Rate of fire: 8-12 rounds per minute
- Muzzle velocity: 800 m/s (2,600 ft/s) with shaped-charge round 1,430 m/s (4,700 ft/s) with the APFSDS round
- Maximum firing range: 8,000 m (8,700 yd) (with HE shell)
- Feed system: two six-rounds ammunition drums and automatic rammer or manually
- Sights: M213

The CN-105-57, also known as CN 105/57 or D1504, is a light French 105 mm tank gun.

== Design ==
The CN 105-57 is a light 105 mm rifled tank gun originally designed to be mounted on light tanks with oscillating turret such as the French AMX-13 and the Austrian SK-105 Kurassier. It uses the same conventional ammunition as the longer and heavier CN 105 F1 but smaller and lighter propellant charges with shorter cartridges cases enable it to be fitted into the FL 12, FL 15 and FL 20 light tanks oscillating turrets. Other changes to the gun include a horizontal breechblock, a muzzle brake, and a single-cylinder recoil mechanism together with a single hydropneumatic recuperator.

The 105 mm L44/57 FTR gun produced in Argentina at the Fábrica Militar «Río Tercero» (FM «RT»), Río Tercero, Córdoba, which was a copy of the French CN-105-57 gun.

== Ammunition ==
- OCC 105 F1 : a 10.85 kg non-rotating shaped-charge round with a muzzle velocity of 800 m/s.
- OE 105 : a 12.1 kg high-explosive shell with a muzzle velocity of 700 m/s.
- OECL 105 : a 11.7 kg illuminating round with a muzzle velocity of 295 m/s.
- OFUM 105 : a 12.8 kg smoke shell with a muzzle velocity of 695 m/s.
- OFL 105 G1 : a 3.41 kg APFSDS using the same 1.8 kg penetrator as the 105 mm OFL 105 F3, it has a muzzle velocity of 1430–1475 m/s and penetrates 120 mm of RHA steel at impact angle of 67° at 1000 m..
- 105 MM MLE 57 APFSDS-T : an Austrian APFSDS designed by Hirtenberger Defense Systems of Austria, it has a muzzle velocity of 1410 m/s and penetrates 250 mm of RHA steel at impact angle of 30° at 1000 m.

== CN 105 G1 ==
The Giat Industries 105 mm G1 is a further development of the 105 mm CN 105/57 which is installed in the French FL 12, FL 15 and FL 20 oscillating turrets. The modification enables the weapon to fire the 105 mm OFL 105 G1 APFSDS ammunition. The ordnance is fitted with a new single baffle muzzle brake, a thermal sleeve, a fume extractor and semi-automatic horizontal breech mechanism.

== Additional specifications ==
- Factory designation: D1504
- Overall length: 4.622 m
- Rifling twist: 7°10' right hand
- Number of grooves: 32
- Muzzle brake: single baffle
- Recoil mechanism: single hydraulic brake cylinder
- Recuperator: single hydraulic recuperator
- Maximum recoil length: 388 mm
- Overall weight: 1210 kg
- Recoiling gun mass: 1065 kg
- Firing mechanism: mechanical
