= AMX-13 =

French light tank

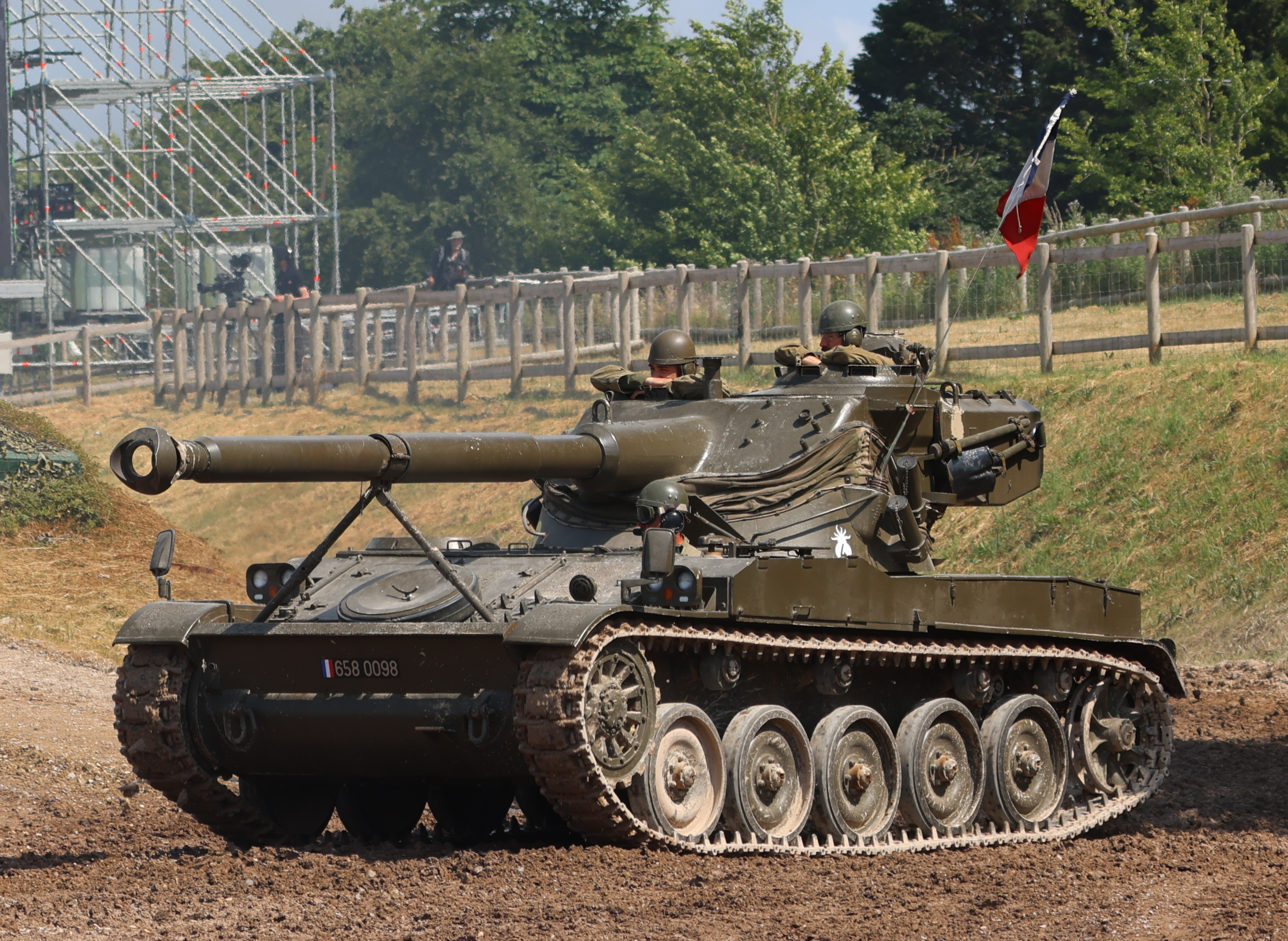
- AMX-13/105 at Tankfest 2023
- Type: Light tank
- Place of origin: France

Service history
- Wars: Suez Crisis; Algerian War; Sand War; Vietnam War; Cambodian Civil War; Dominican Civil War; Annexation of Goa (1961); Indo-Pakistani War of 1965; 30 September Movement; Six-Day War; Western Sahara War; Indonesian invasion of East Timor; Lebanese Civil War; Salvadoran Civil War; Guatemalan Civil War; Insurgency in Aceh

Production history
- Designer: Atelier de Construction d'Issy-les-Moulineaux
- Designed: 1946
- Manufacturer: Atelier de Construction Roanne
- Produced: 1952–1987
- No. built: 7,700 (Total); 3,400 (Exported); 4,300 (Used in French military)

Specifications
- Mass: 13.7 t (30,000 lb) empty 14.5 t (32,000 lb) combat
- Length: 6.36 m (20 ft 10 in) with gun 4.88 m (16 ft 0 in) hull
- Width: 2.51 m (8 ft 3 in)
- Height: 2.35 m (7 ft 9 in)
- Crew: 3 (Commander, gunner and driver)
- Armour: 10–40 mm (0.39–1.57 in)
- Main armament: AMX-13/75: 75 mm SA 50 L/61; AMX-13/90: 90 mm CN-90-F3 L/52; AMX-13/105: 105 mm CN-105-57 L/44 with 32 Rounds
- Secondary armament: 1× 7.5 mm (or 7.62 mm) coaxial machine gun with 3,600 Rounds; 1× 7.62 mm AA machine gun (optional); 2× 2 smoke grenade dischargers
- Engine: SOFAM Model 8Gxb 8-cylinder water-cooled petrol engine 250 hp (190 kW)
- Power/weight: 17 hp/tonne
- Suspension: Torsion bar suspension
- Operational range: 400 km (250 mi)
- Maximum speed: 60 km/h (37 mph)

The AMX-13 is a French light tank produced from 1952 to 1987. It served with the French Army, as the Char 13t-75 Modèle 51, and was exported to more than 26 other nations. Named after its initial weight of 13 tonnes, and featuring a tough and reliable chassis, it was fitted with an oscillating turret built by GIAT Industries (now KNDS France) with revolver-type magazines, which were also used on the Austrian SK-105 Kürassier. Including prototypes and export versions, over a hundred variants exist, including self-propelled guns, anti-aircraft systems, APCs, and ATGM versions.

== Development ==
The tank was designed at the Atelier de Construction d'Issy-les-Moulineaux (AMX) in 1946 to meet a requirement for an air-portable vehicle to support paratroopers. The prototype ran from 1948. The compact chassis had torsion bar suspension with five road wheels and two return rollers; the engine runs the length of the tank on the right side, with the driver on the left. It features an uncommon two-part FL-10 oscillating turret, where the gun is fixed to the turret and the entire upper turret changes elevation. The turret is set to the rear of the vehicle and holds the commander and gunner.

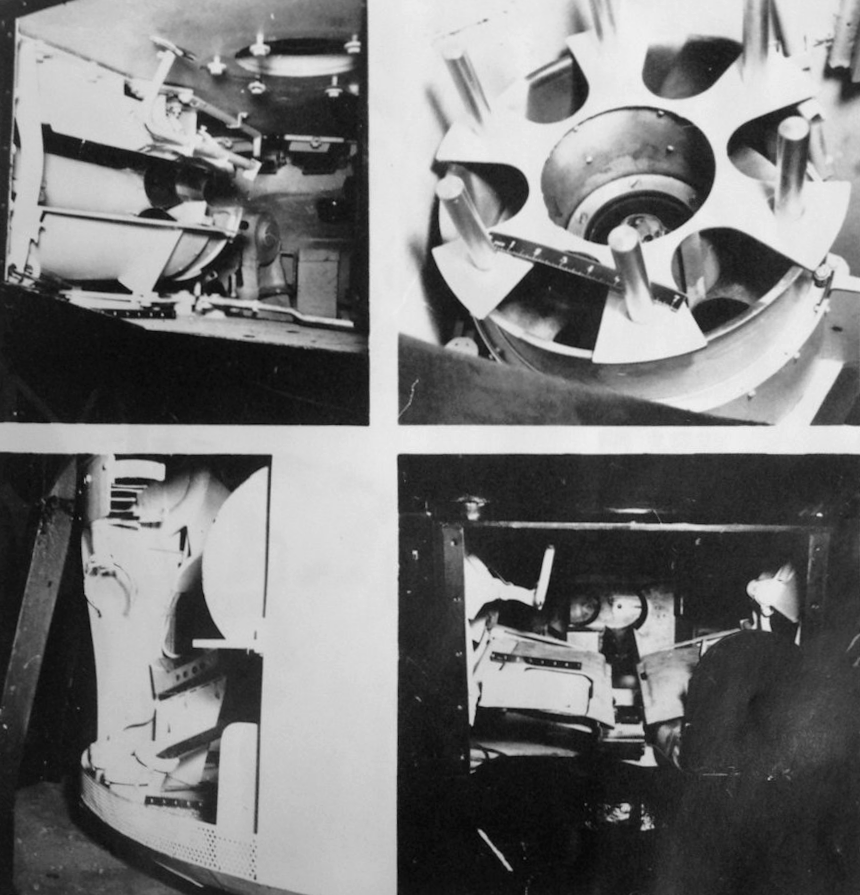
Revolver style magazine drums in the bustle rack of the AMX-13 prototype, at the time known as the AMX-12t, during trials at Aberdeen Proving Ground, 19 December 1950

The original 75 mm SA 50 gun was loaded by an automatic loading system fed by two six-round magazines located on either side of the automatic loader in the turret's bustle. The 12 rounds available in the drum magazines meant that the crew could engage targets quickly; once those rounds were expended, the vehicle commander and gunner could either manually refill them from within the turret or retreat to cover and reload shells from outside the vehicle through hatches above.

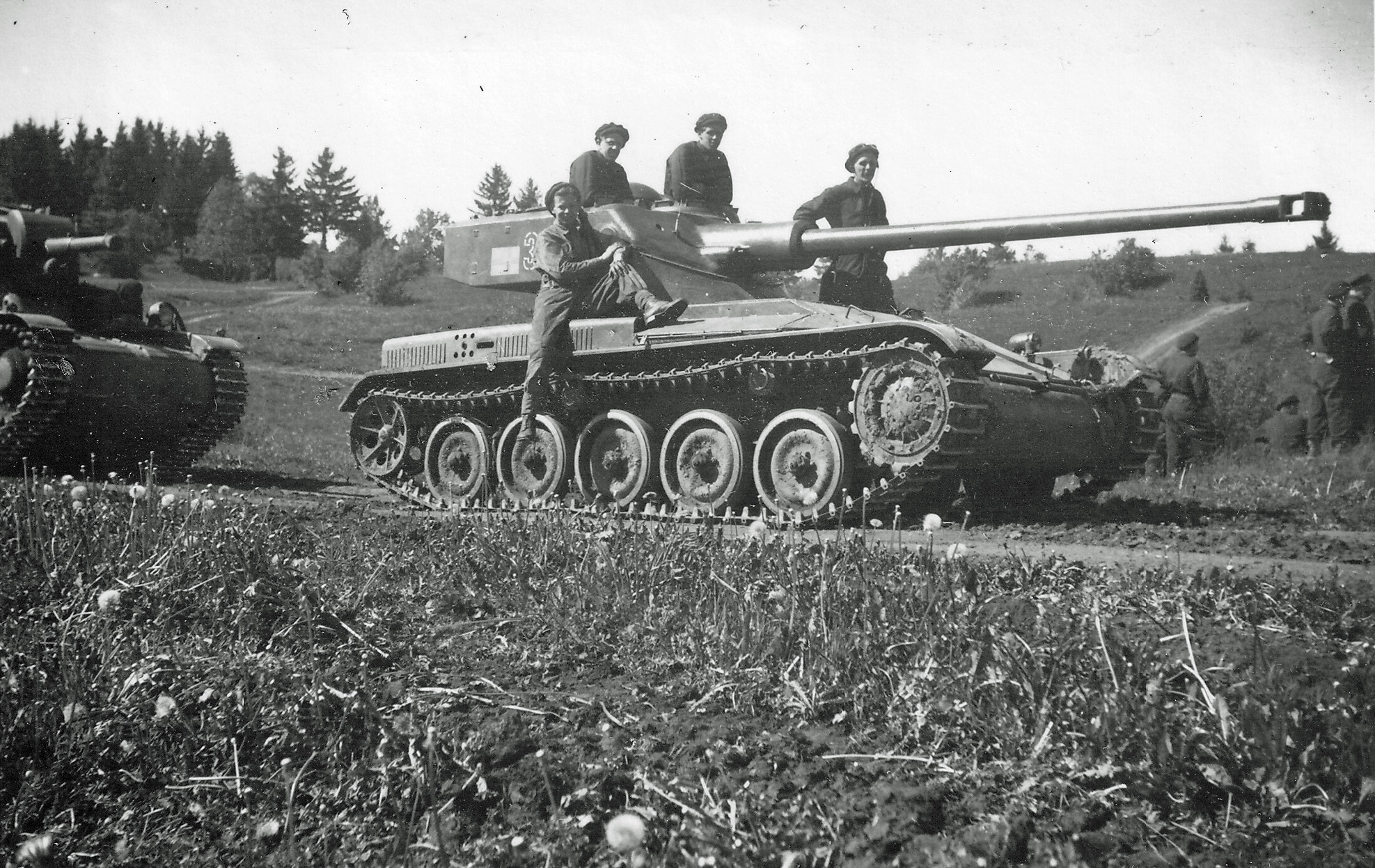
Early variant of the AMX-13 trialled in Sweden, 1952

Production began at ARE (Atelier de Construction Roanne) in 1952, with the first tanks delivered the following year. In 1964, production was transferred to Creusot-Loire at Chalon-sur-Saône, as ARE switched to the production of the AMX-30 MBT, and the numbers produced declined significantly.

After 1966, the AMX-13s in French service were up-gunned with a 90 mm CN-90-F3 L/52 medium pressure gun firing more effective high-explosive anti-tank (HEAT) munitions; this variant was designated AMX-13/90. The F3 was similar to the DEFA D921/F1 low-pressure gun developed for the Panhard AML-90, and even utilized the same ammunition, though it possessed a significantly higher muzzle velocity. By the late 1960s, an export model of the AMX-13 was also available with an even larger 105 mm CN-105 L/57 gun in a FL-12 turret.

Although there were many variants of the turret, the basic chassis was almost unchanged until 1985, when changes including a new diesel engine, fully automatic transmission and new hydropneumatic suspension were introduced. Production halted with the AMX-13 Model 1987. After-sales support and upgrades are still offered through GIAT Industries (now Nexter).

The AMX-13 tank was phased out of service with the French Army in the 1980s. Current French armoured vehicles with a similar role are the ERC 90 Sagaie and the AMX 10 RC.

=== Additional characteristics ===
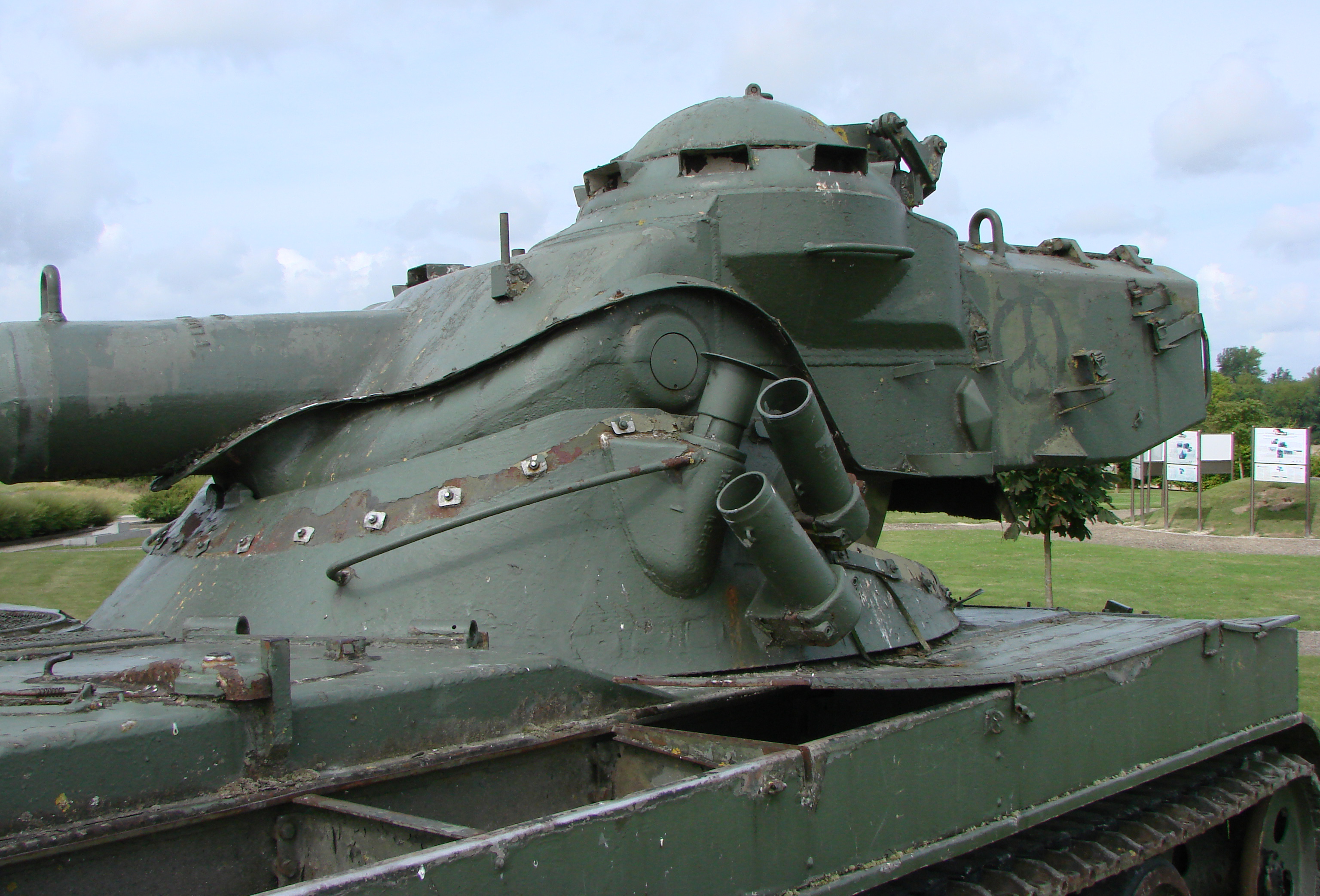
Close view of oscillating turret

- Ground clearance: 370 mm (15 in)
- Fording: 600 mm (24 in)
- Vertical obstacle 650 mm (26 in)
- Trench: 1.6 m (5 ft 3 in)
- Gradient 60%
- Side slope: 60%
- NBC system: None
- Night vision: Optional

== Service history ==
=== France ===
During the 1956 Suez Crisis, the French Army used two sections of the 2nd Foreign Cavalry Regiment's AMX-13 tanks in Port Fouad. The AMX-13s also saw limited action in the Algerian War, largely due to the rough terrain in the countryside, where much of the fighting with the anti-colonial guerillas took place. France also fielded a number of AMX-13s fitted with US Chaffee light tank turrets in the fighting in Algeria.

=== Argentina ===
The Argentine Army operated several locally produced variants of French armored fighting vehicles throughout the Cold War period, notably the AMX-13-105 light tank and the AMX-VCI armored personnel carrier, both derived from the AMX-13 chassis. These platforms were assembled and upgraded domestically in order to support Argentina’s armored and mechanized units.

==== Falkands War ====
Although the newly developed Tanque Argentino Mediano (TAM) main battle tank had not yet reached operational readiness in sufficient numbers during the 1982 Falklands War, Argentine AMX-13s were not deployed to the Falkland Islands. Argentine high command assessed that the islands’ terrain — characterized by peat bogs, marshland, rocky ground, and poor off-road mobility conditions — was unsuitable for tracked armored operations.

Instead, the Argentine Army favored the deployment of wheeled armored reconnaissance vehicles such as the Panhard AML-90. The AML-90 offered superior strategic and tactical mobility on the islands’ limited road network and rough terrain, while also simplifying logistical support and maintenance requirements. Although its 90 mm low-pressure gun lacked the firepower of the AMX-13-105’s 105 mm main gun, Argentine commanders considered the trade-off acceptable given the operational environment.

==== Retirement ====
The AMX-13 remained in Argentine service for several years after the Falklands War in secondary and training roles before being progressively phased out in favor of the TAM and more modern armored platforms.

=== Dominican Republic ===
AMX-13s saw service among both the loyalists and the rebels during the Dominican Civil War of 1965. Two AMX-13s used by the rebel forces were destroyed by M50 Ontos of the United States Marine Corps during the subsequent American intervention in the Dominican Republic.

=== Israel ===
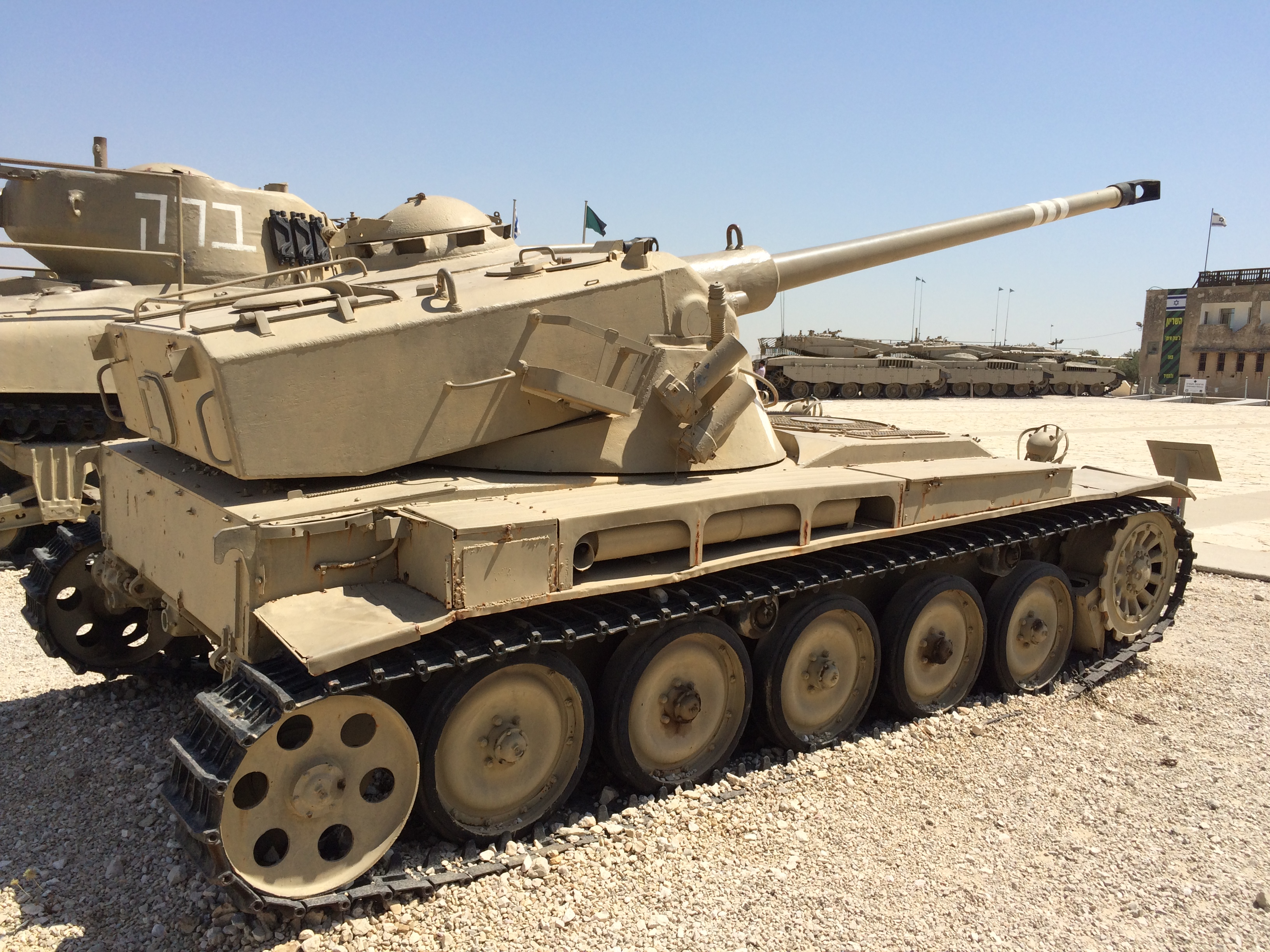
Decommissioned Israeli AMX-13 on display at Yad La-Shiryon Tank Museum in Latrun

The AMX-13 was Israel's first modern tank and was purchased at a time when France was the only country willing to openly sell arms to Israel. By 1956, Israel had ordered 180 AMX-13 light tanks as part of an agreement to reinforce Israel's military and to maintain the balance in Israel's favour after the Egyptian–Czechoslovak arms deal. Besides buying whole AMX-13s, Israel also purchased a quantity of SA 50 75mm tank guns for upgunning some of the American M4 Sherman tanks. Due to the shortage of tanks, the IDF used them as main battle tanks and employed them to form a tank battalion in the 7th Armored Brigade. IDF reconnaissance units did not use AMX-13s.

By 1967, Israel had less than 100 AMX-13s and formed three AMX-13 battalions, all of which fought actively on all fronts during the Six-Day War. The first battalion moved south in the West Bank area through Taluzi and Tubas and occupied Nablus (against Jordan). The second, attacking Egypt, captured the strongpoints protecting the Gaza Strip and the coastal road in the north of the Sinai Peninsula. The third, finally, assaulted the Golan Heights in southwestern Syria.

The IDF realised that the AMX-13 tank was too lightly armoured and had a weak main gun. Losses were heavy at places like Rafah Junction and Jiradi Pass during the Six-Day War with many destroyed by heavier Arab-fielded Soviet armour, such as T-55 MBTs and IS-3 (tank) heavy tanks. Subsequently, Israel gradually phased out all of its AMX-13s following the Six-Day War, with most ending up being sold to the then newly established Singapore Army between 1968 and 1969.

=== India ===
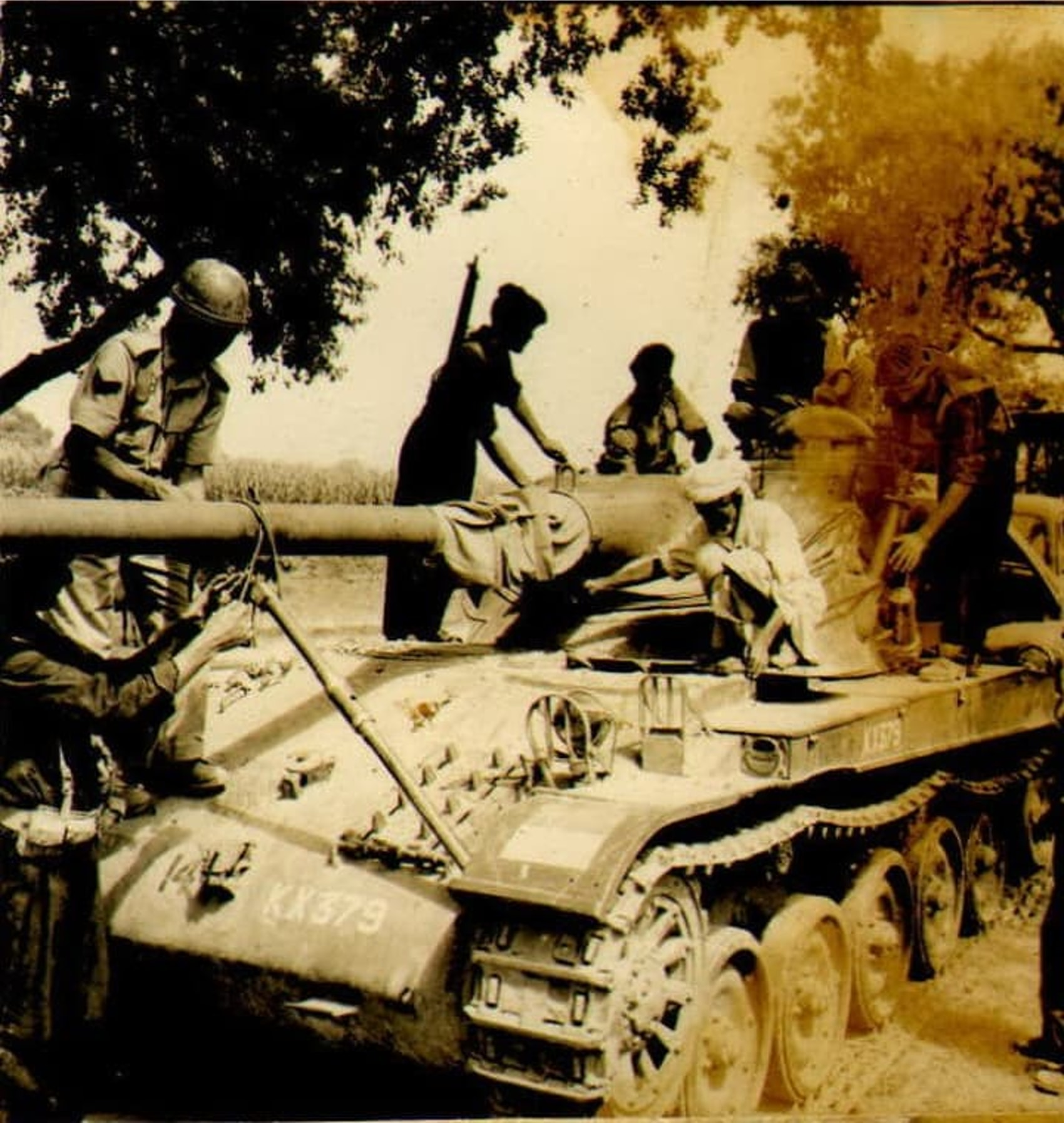
Indian AMX-13

During the 1965 Indo-Pakistan War, India deployed AMX-13 Tanks to oppose the initial armour onslaught of Operation Grand Slam in the Chhamb-Jaurian area and also in the Battle of Asal Uttar.

During the 1965 Indo-Pakistani War in Chhamb-Jaurian in Jammu & Kashmir, the 20 Lancers, equipped with AMX-13 tanks, was under command of the 10th Infantry Division. Pakistan's surprise attack on 1 September, Operation Grand Slam, fell on 191 Infantry Brigade which was supported by "C" Squadron of the regiment, under Maj Bhaskar Roy. The Pakistani armoured attack comprised two regiments, one of M48 Patton medium tanks and one of M36B2 tank destroyers. The attack began at 0805 hours and was strongly resisted. During the initial phases of the attack, Roy destroyed six Pattons and three recoilless guns, and captured a jeep. A second attack was launched by Pakistani armour at 1100 hours and contested by the AMX-13s of 20 Lancers, which, despite being outgunned and outnumbered, destroyed a total 13 tanks that day and prevented the encirclement of 191 Infantry Brigade. The regiment later fought in the defence of Jaurian under 41 Infantry Brigade. For the defence of Chhamb-Jaurian, the regiment was awarded a theatre honour and Maj Bhaskar Roy was awarded Maha Vir Chakra for his leadership in this action.

In the Battle of Assal Uttar, on 8–10 September 1965 in Asal Uttar (Khem Karan, Punjab, India), a regiment of AMX-13s — 8th Light Cavalry — along with a regiment each of Centurions and M4 Shermans fought off and defeated a Pakistani armoured offensive comprising five regiments of M48 Patton tanks and one regiment of M24 Chaffee tanks.

=== Indonesia ===
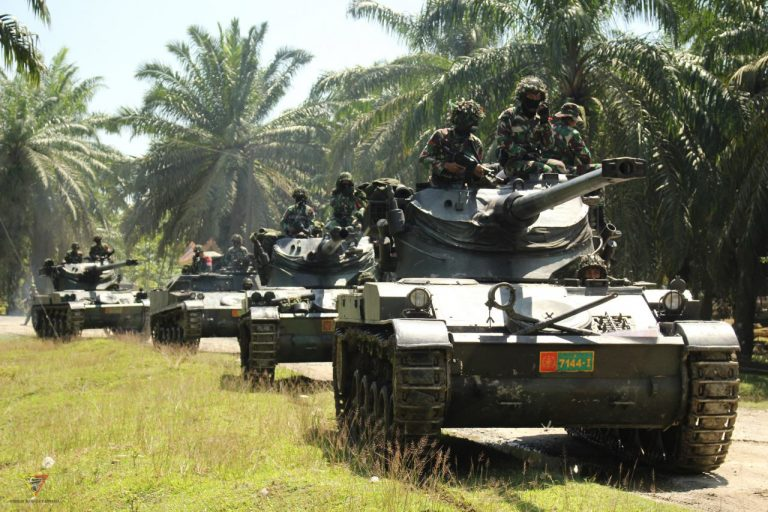
Indonesian AMX-13/75 Modèle 51 (SM1) in the lead of another two AMX-13 tanks and one AMX-VTT APC

The Indonesian Army received 175 AMX-13/75, 32 AMX-VCI (including four command variants and six ARV variants), and 10 AMX-13 PDP from France in 1960, which were delivered in 1960–1962. Indonesia then bought around 100 to 180 ex-Royal Netherlands Army AMX-VCI in 1976, which were modernized and delivered in 1977–1978. The last batch of AMX-13 family were bought in 1980–1981, when the Army acquired 130 second-hand but modernized AMX-13/105 from the Netherlands.

The AMX-13s first saw combat against the 30 September Movement in 1965, when they were deployed to secure Suharto's control of Jakarta against an alleged coup by other generals'.

AMX-13/75 tanks and the VCI variants participated in the 1975 Indonesian invasion of East Timor (known in Indonesia as Operasi Seroja).

Indonesian AMX-13s also participated in the 2003–2004 Indonesian offensive in Aceh.

The AMX-13 gained momentary notoriety in Indonesian social media in September 2020, after an AMX-13 driver lost control when making a turn and ran over a street food vendor cart and four motorcycles. The accident happened on 10 September 2020 at around 11:00 WIB, at an intersection in Cipatat District, West Bandung Regency, during a 4th Cavalry Battalion company-level combat readiness exercise. No one was injured and the owners of the cart and vehicles were given compensation totalling 15.4 million rupiah.

=== Lebanon ===
The Lebanese Army was an important user of the AMX-13 in the Middle East, purchasing 42 AMX-13/75s and 22 AMX-13/105s from France in 1972 as part of a modernization program. During the Lebanese Civil War, the Lebanese AMX-13s saw extensive service in the hands of the regular Lebanese Army and various armed groups in and outside Beirut between 1975 and 1990, following the collapse of the Lebanese Armed Forces (LAF) structure in January 1976, and later again in February 1984 in the wake of the Mountain War. During this period, most of the regular Army's AMX-13s fell into the hands of the competing Christian-rightist Lebanese Front and Muslim-leftist Lebanese National Movement (LNM) militias or were taken way by dissident rebellious Lebanese Army factions. France later delivered an additional 13 AMX-13/90s to the regular Lebanese Army between 1978–1981 and again in 1984. Captured AMX-13s were employed by the Lebanese Arab Army (LAA), Army of Free Lebanon (AFL), Kataeb Regulatory Forces (KRF), Tigers Militia, Lebanese Forces (LF), South Lebanon Army (SLA), Amal Movement, and the People's Liberation Army (PLA). Nearly all AMX-13s were eventually returned by the demobilized militias to the Lebanese Army between 1990 and 1993. Currently, none of the Lebanese AMX-13 light tanks is believed to remain operational.

In July 2018, six of these withdrawn AMX-13 and various other former Lebanese Army military vehicles were dumped in the sea off the coast of Sidon in southern Lebanon and used as part of an artificial reef.

=== Morocco ===
Morocco used some AMX-13s in the Sand War of 1963. Later on, they were engaged in the Western Sahara conflict. They were supplemented by the similar Austrian SK-105 Kürassier light tank during that war.

== Prototypes ==
- Char AMX-13 (2A): Prototype with 4 roadwheels and trailing idler
- Char AMX-13 (2B): Prototype with 5 roadwheels and raised idler
- Char AMX-13 (2C): Prototype with FL-10 turret and two support rollers
- Char AMX-13 (2D): Prototype with 4 support rollers
- Char AMX-13 (2E): Prototype with 3 support rollers and 90 mm gun
- Char AMX-13 (2F): Prototype with 2 support rollers and, later, a thermal sleeve

=== Other prototypes ===
- AMX-13 avec tourelle A14: Fitted with a German HS-30 turret
- AMX-13/105: Fitted with a 105 mm howitzer barrel
- AMX-13/75 (AMX-13e): Experimental variant with a short-barreled SA 49 75 mm in FL-11 oscillating turret
- Char AMX-13 avec Canon 57 L/100: Prototype with a special gun
- AMX-13 Twin 20 mm in a welded turret without a bustle
- Char 48FCM: AKA Char 12T FCM, DCA de Quatre Canons de 20 mm—4 x 20 mm cannon in an FL-4 turret
- DCA de 40 mm: AKA Char 13T DCA a 40 mm Bofors L/70 gun in a large faceted turret (DCA = Défense Contre Avions)
- AMX-13 GTI: Improved suspension by Krauss-Maffei
- AMX-13 THS: Prototype fitted with hydrostatic transmission
- AMX-13: Fitted with Rapace 14 MBRL
- AMX-13 HOT: Fitted with HOT ATGM launchers

== Production variants ==
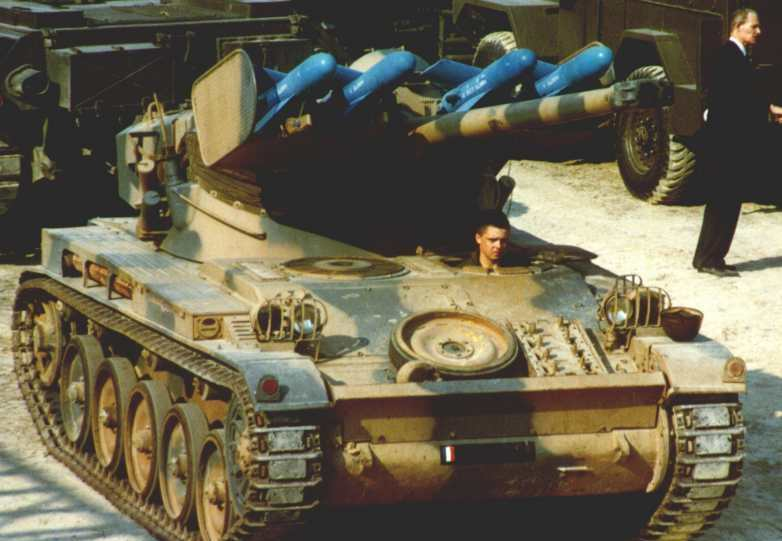
SS.11 anti-tank missile-launcher version of the AMX-13

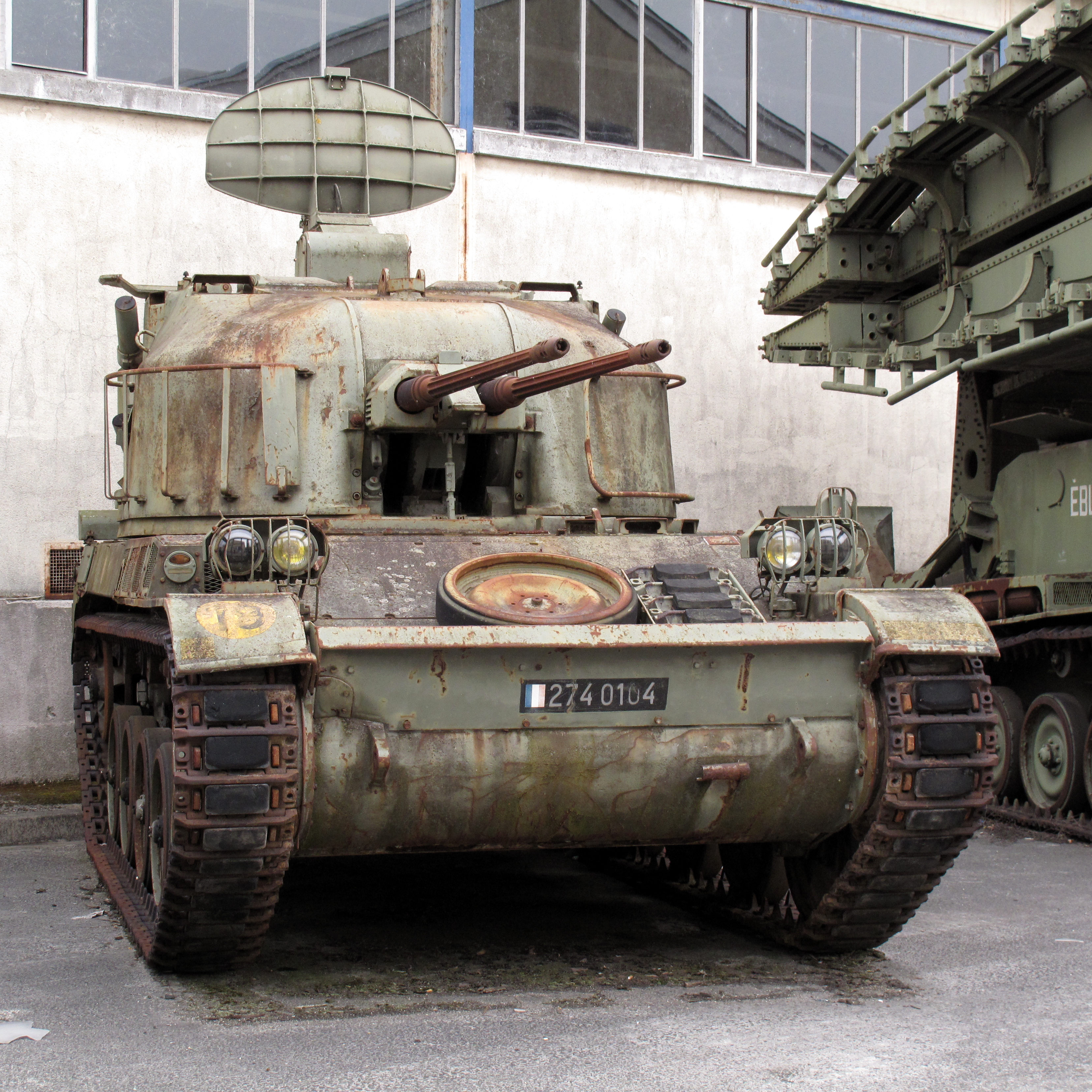
AMX-13 DCA AA version

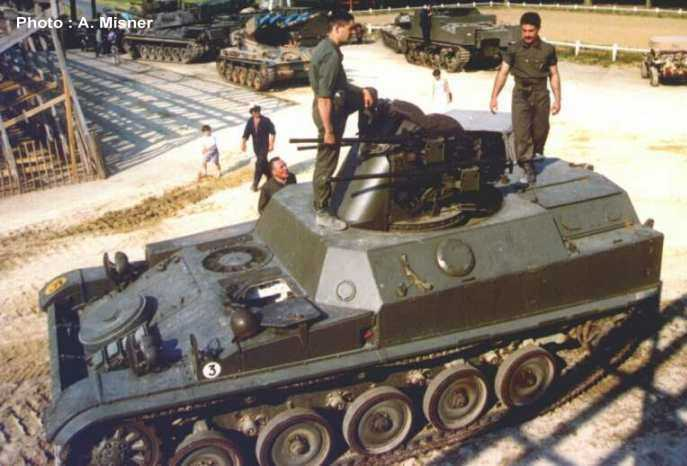
Modified AMX VCI (APC version of the AMX-13) with the American M55 turret fixed with M45 Quadmount anti-aircraft quad guns

- AMX-Chaffee: Some initial vehicles were fitted with the turret of the M24 Chaffee
- AMX-13 [DTT]: Initial vehicles with the turret of the M24 Chaffee converted into a driver training tank (DTT). Gun removed.
- AMX-13/75 Modèle 51: High-velocity SA 50 75 mm Gun in FL-10 turret, with four top rollers and revised stowage
- AMX-13/75 Modèle 51 FL11: Low-recoil SA 49 75 mm gun in FL-11 turret as installed in Panhard EBR armoured car, with two top rollers
- AMX-13 T75 (Char Lance SS-11): Fitted with SS.11 ATGM launchers
- AMX-13 T75 avec TCA: Fitted with an electronic guidance system for the missiles (TCA stands for "télécommande automatique")
- AMX-13/90 C90: FL-10 turret refitted with the CN 90 F3 90 mm gun
- AMX-13/90 LRF: Fitted with a laser rangefinder
- AMX-13/105 Modèle 58: Fitted with a CN 105-57 105 mm Gun in an FL-12 turret (used by the Argentine Army and the Netherlands)
- AMX-13/105: Upgraded export version of the Modele 58 with a thermal sleeve and a revised hull front
- AMX-13 Model 1987

=== Late production version ===
- AMX-13 DCA bitube de 30 mm: SPAAG version with a retractable radar and two 30mm cannons fitted; 60 were produced beginning in 1969. (DCA = Défense Contre Avions)
- AMX-13 [Training Tank]: AMX-13 with the turret removed; used for driver training
- AMX-13 CD (Char de Depannage) Modèle 55 (AMX-D): Recovery version
- AMX-13 PDP (Poseur De Pont) Modèle 57: Scissors-type bridgelayer

==== Modernisation packages ====
- Cockerill 90 mm Regunning Packaging: 90 mm up gunning package
- Giat Industries upgrade with a Baudouin 6F 11 SRY diesel engine and an upgraded turret
- Giat Industries Add-on Armour package installed on turret front/sides and glacis plate
- NIMDA Upgrade Package: Israeli retrofit package
- INDRA Amazon Fire Control System upgrade with thermal imaging and a laser rangefinder

=== International ===
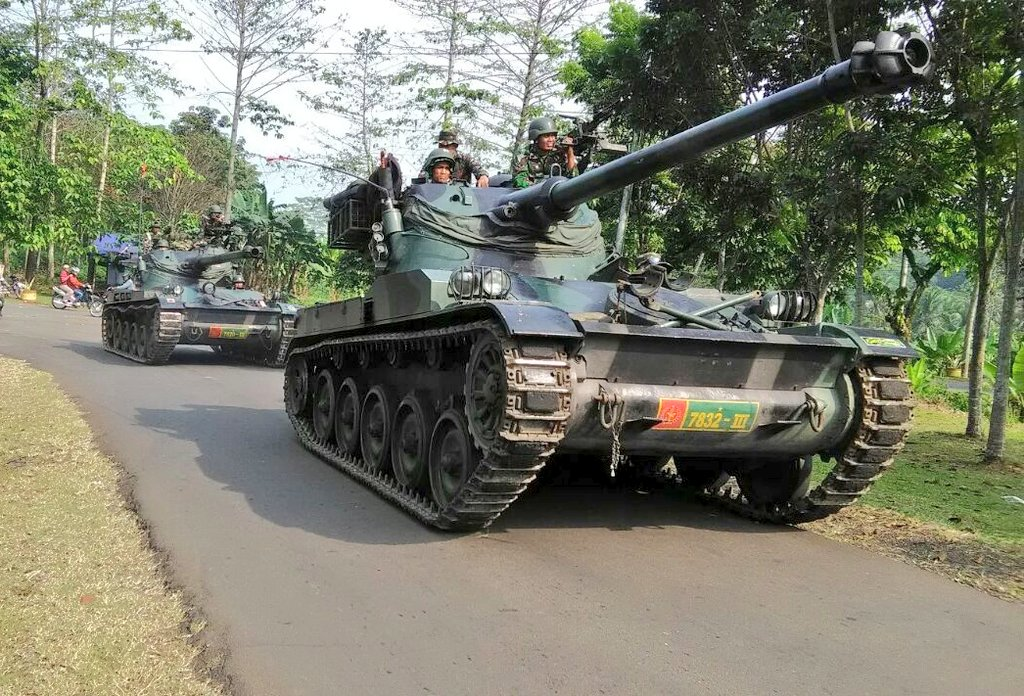
The Indonesian Army's AMX-13/105 Modèle 58 (SM1) Note the hydropneumatic suspension and also the modified hull and turret stowage bins as part of SM1 upgrade

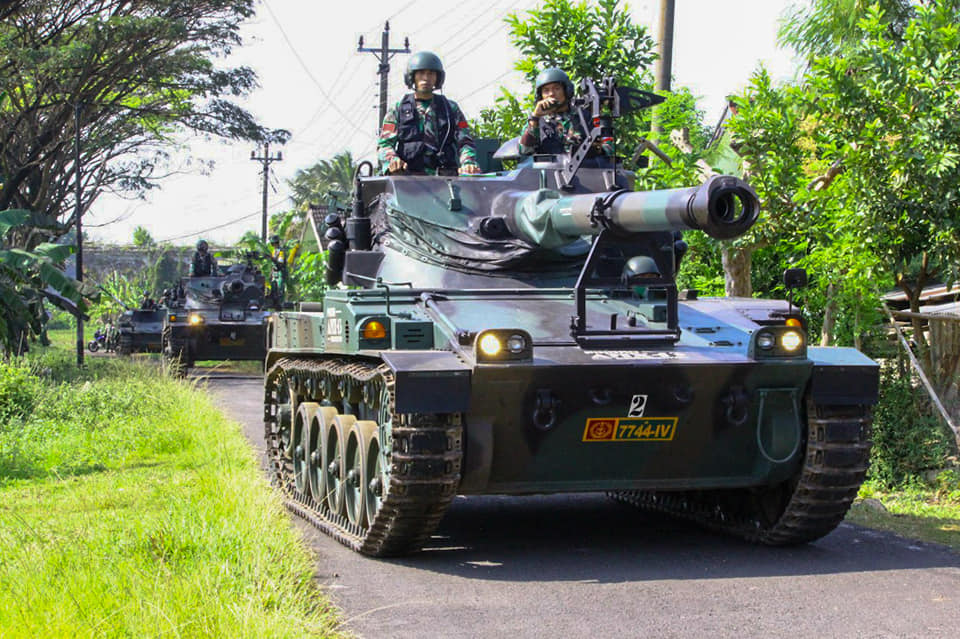
The Indonesian Army's AMX-13/105 Retrofit

Indonesia

- AMX-13/75 Modèle 51 (SM1) some were upgraded in 1995 with Detroit Diesel DDA GM6V-53T, ZF 5WG-180 Automatic Transmission, and hydropneumatic "Dunlopstrut" Suspension. Based on Singapore SM1 upgrade packages but without the upgraded gunner sight.
- AMX-13/105 Modèle 58 (SM1) some were upgraded in 1995 with Detroit Diesel DDA GM6V-53T, ZF 5WG-180 Automatic Transmission, and hydropneumatic "Dunlopstrut" Suspension. Based on Singapore SM1 upgrade packages but without the upgraded gunner sight.
- AMX-13/105 Retrofit major modernization and upgrade program done by local defense firm PT. PINDAD featuring reworked front glacis to accommodate new diesel engine & transmission, new torsion bar suspension, updated FCS (laser range finder, thermal imager, day camera), new 105 mm gun (GIAT CN 105 G1) and turret (Steyr JT-1 Oscillating turret) from SK-105 Kürassier.

Netherlands

- AMX-13/FL-12: Dutch upgrade fitted with a searchlight and FN MAG machine guns
- AMX-13/FL-15: Dutch FL-12 version refitted with an FL-15 Turret

Peru

- AMX-13PA5 Escorpion Upgrade for a standard AMX-13/105 by the Peruvian designer Sergio Casanave, fitted with modern communications and four anti-tank guided missiles.
- AMX-13PA8 Escorpion-2 Equipped with Dante fire-control system (a ballistic computer/laser range-finder/night vision/CCTV system). Four Ukrainian laser-guided Barrier R-2 anti-tank missiles and 7.62 mm and 12.7 mm machine guns were also proposed.

Singapore

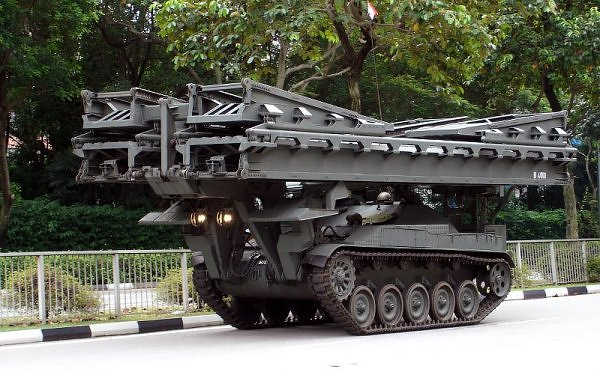
The Singapore Army's AMX-13 Armoured Vehicle-Launched Bridge (AVLB)

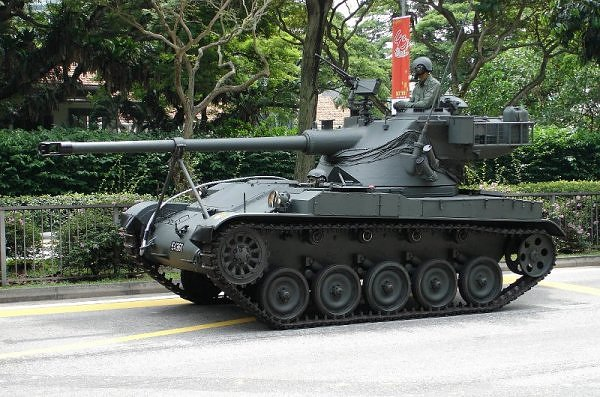
The Singapore Army's AMX-13/SM-1 (Singapore Modernised 1)

- AMX-13S Rebuild of standard AMX-13/75 Modèle 51 (FL-10) by Singapore prior to SM-1 upgrade.
- AMX-13SM1 (Singapore Modernised 1): Singaporean upgrade with modern communications, a new diesel engine replacing the original petrol engine, improved transmissions/suspensions system, laser range-finder and night vision elbow upgrade by ST Kinetics. The 75 mm main gun remained unchanged.

Switzerland

- Leichter Panzer 51: Swiss Army version

Venezuela

- AMX-13V CLI upgraded AMX-13/90 for Venezuelan Army
- AMX-13 [LAR-160] Venezuelan MLRS version armed with IMI LAR-160 mm rockets
- AMX-13M51 Ráfaga Venezuelan Army's AA version armed with two 40 mm cannons mounted on an M-4E1 turret

=== APC ===
The AMX-13 was the basis of a family of APCs beginning with the AMX-VTT and culminating with the AMX-VCI. The APC chassis was itself the basis of a number of variants.

- AMX-VTT
- AMX-VCI

=== Self-propelled howitzer ===
105 mm

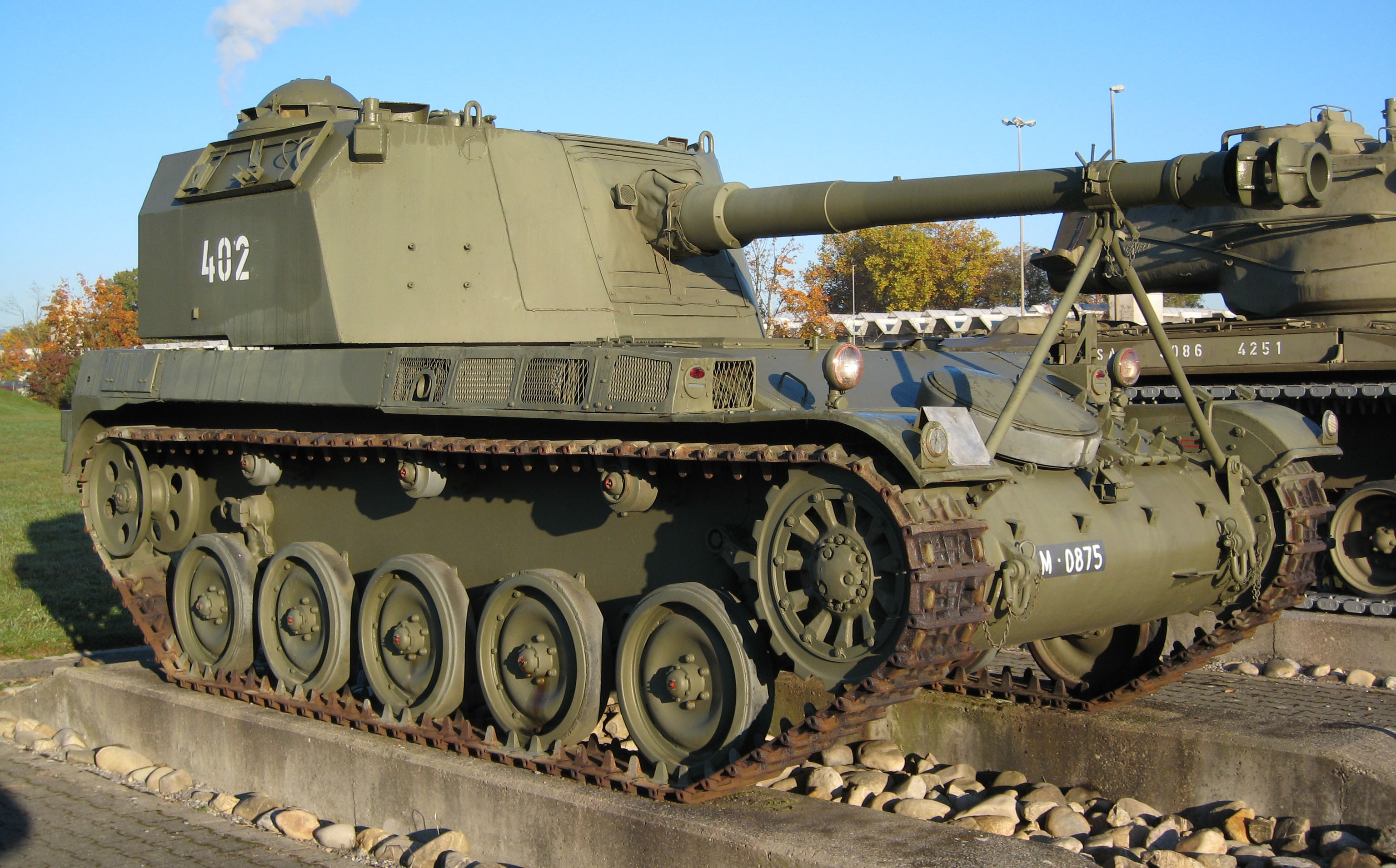
105mm howitzer variant 4 purchased for trials by the Swiss Army.

- AMX Mk 61 (AMX-105A) Automoteur de 105 du AMX-13 en casemate: 105 mm casemate SP
- AMX Mk 61 (Netherlands) Dutch Army version with 30 calibre howitzer and Browning commander's MG
- AMX Mk 62 (AMX-105B) prototype with 105 mm howitzer in a turret
- AMX Mk 63 (AMX-105B, AMX Mk F2) prototype of Mk 62 with MG cupola fitted to turret

155 mm

- AMX Mk F3 (obusier de 155 mm sur affut automoteur AMX-13 T, AMX-155) 155 mm SPH

== Operators ==
=== AMX-13 (current) ===
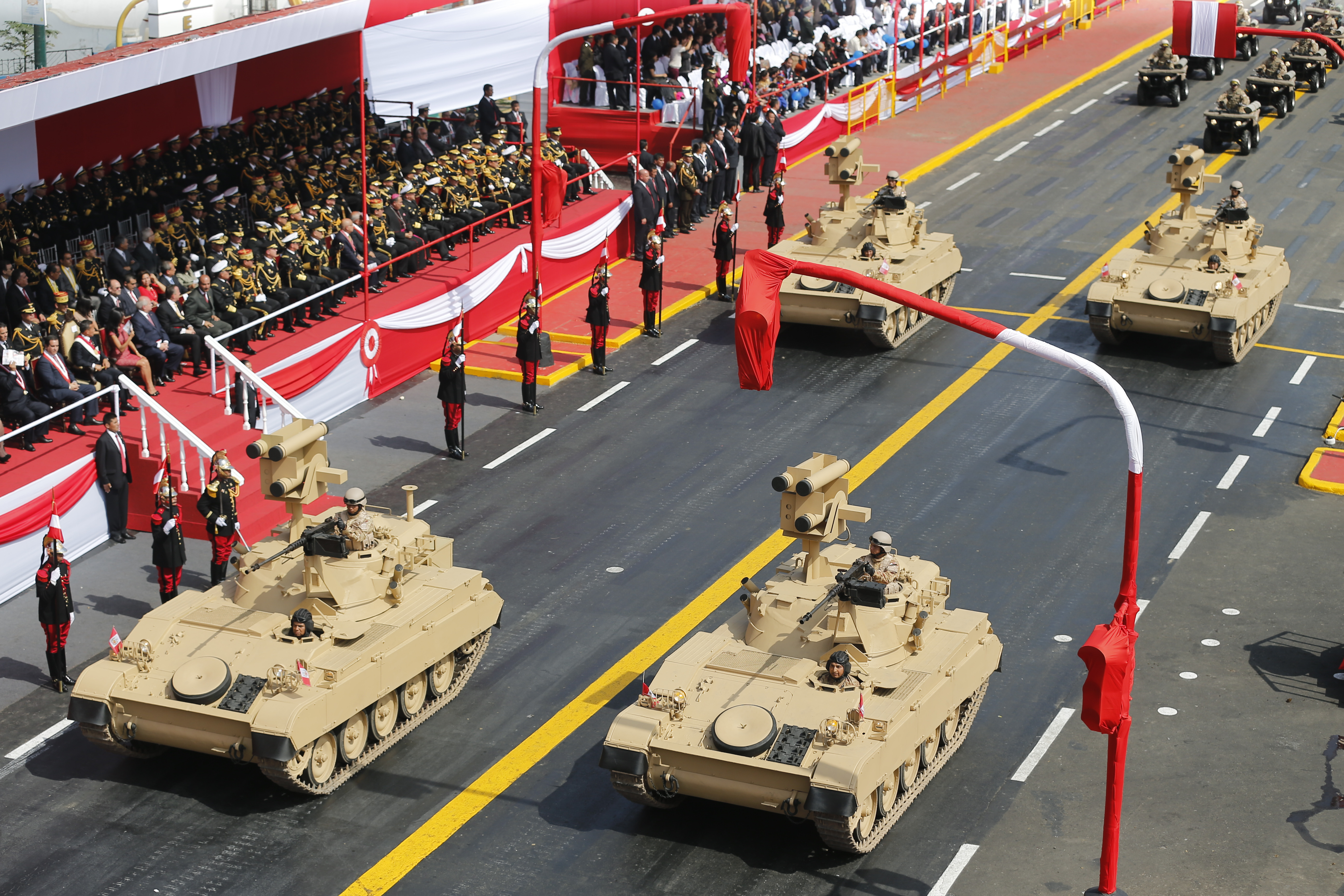
Peruvian AMX-13 minus the 75mm main gun after upgrades and converted to carrying Kornet-E ATGM (NATO reporting name AT-14 Spriggan).

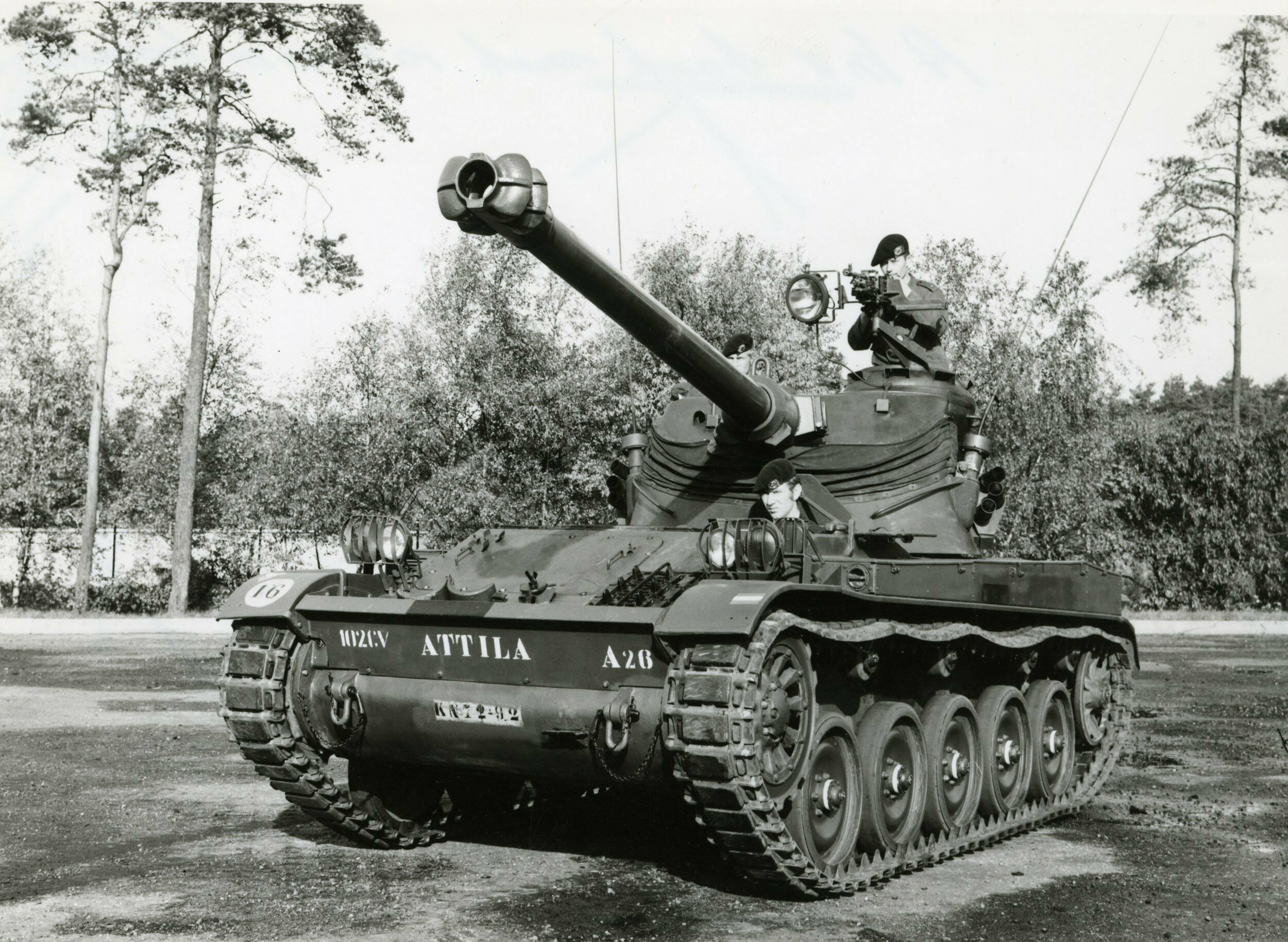
Dutch AMX-13/105 Modèle 58.

- Ecuador: 108 AMX-13/105s purchased from France between 1971 and 1977. 25 in service as of 2024.
- Indonesia: 175 AMX-13/75 and 130 AMX-13/105 purchased from France and The Netherlands. 275 remain in service as of 2024. Scheduled for replacement by the PT Pindad Harimau jointly developed by Indonesia and Turkey.
- Peru: 108 tanks; 30 AMX-13/75s and 78 AMX-13/105s. 96 remain in service as of 2024.
- Venezuela: 40 AMX-13/75s and 31 AMX-13/90s purchased from France. 31 in service.

=== AMX-13 (former) ===
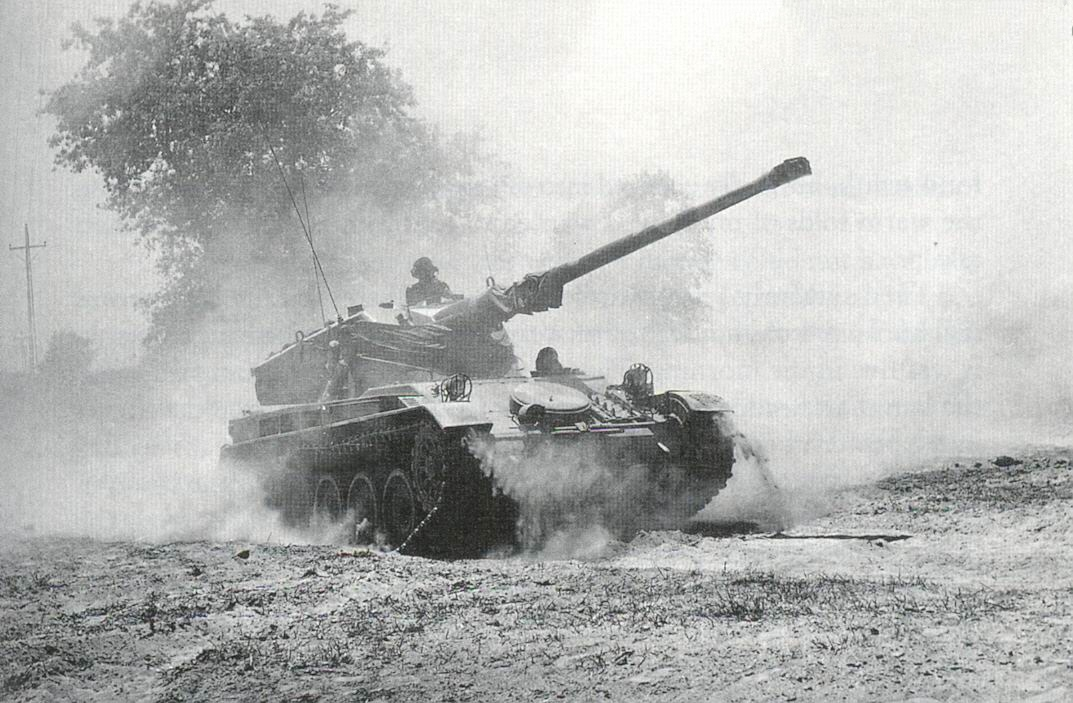
A Pakistani tank crew operating a captured Indian AMX-13

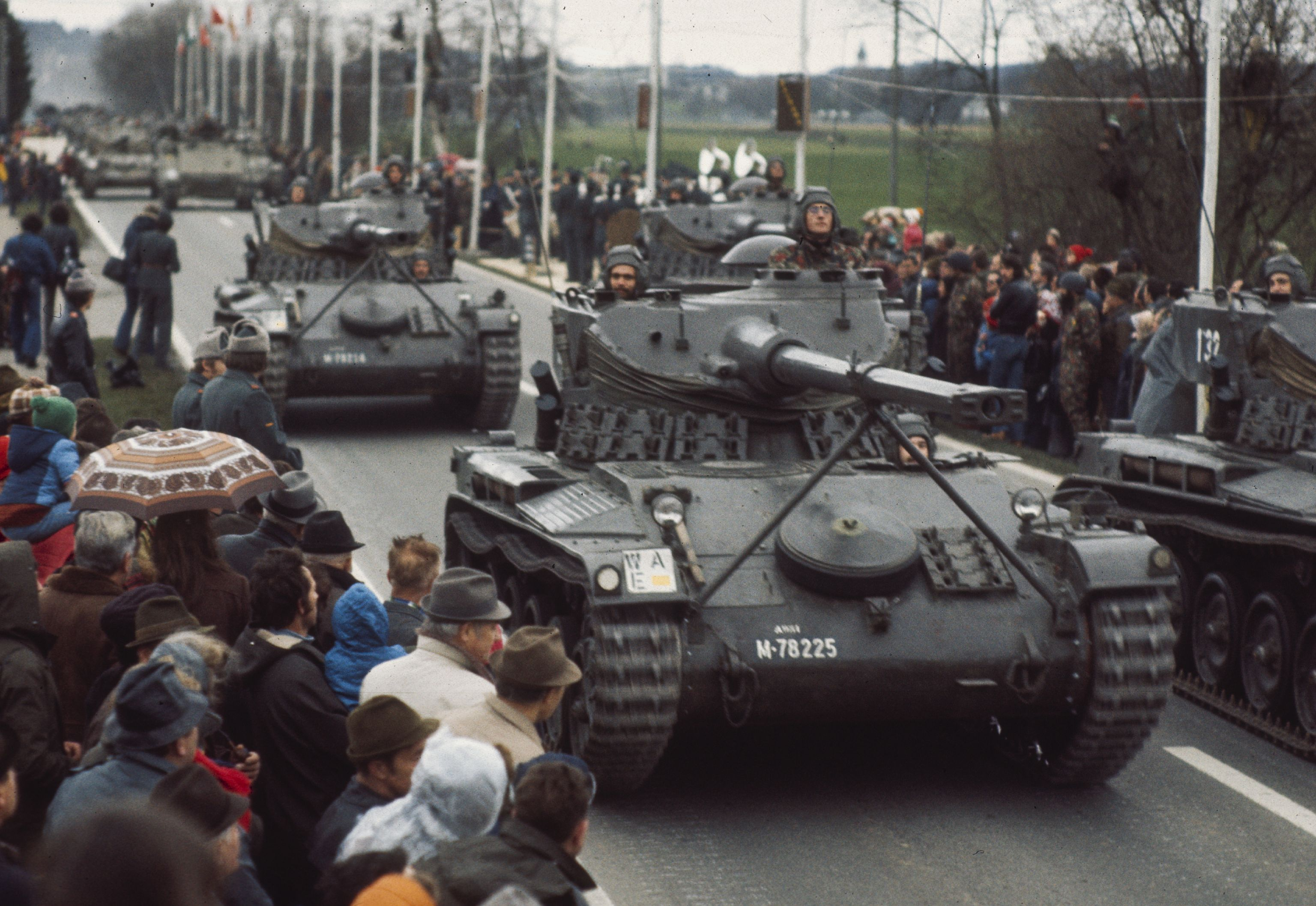
Swiss 75 mm armed AMX-13 light tanks on parade in 1981

- Algeria: 44 AMX-13/75s.
- Argentina: 58 AMX-13/105 and 2 AMX-13 PDP armoured bridge-layers
- Austria: 72 AMX-13/75s and 3 AMX-13 CD armoured recovery vehicles
- Belgium: 555 AMX-13s
- Cambodia: 20 AMX-13/75s
- Djibouti: 60 AMX-13/90s
- Dominican Republic: 15 AMX-13/75s
- Egypt: 20 AMX-13/75s
- France: 4,300 (of all types)
- Guatemala: 8 AMX-13/75s
- India: 164 AMX-13/75s
- Israel: 100 AMX-13/75s
- Ivory Coast: 5 AMX-13/75s
- Lebanon: 75 tanks; 42 AMX-13/75s, 13 AMX-13/90s and 22 AMX-13/105s
- Morocco: 120 AMX-13/75s and 4 AMX-13 CD armoured recovery vehicles
- Nepal: 56 AMX-13/75s; possibly purchased second-hand from Singapore
- Netherlands: 131 AMX-13/105s, as AMX-13 PRLTTK (Pantserrups Lichte Tank) and 34 AMX-13 PRB (Pantserrups Berging) armoured recovery vehicles. All retired in 1983
- Pakistan: Operationalized some amounts of Captured Indian AMX-13/75s.
- Singapore: 340 second-hand AMX-13/75s received (150 from Switzerland, 150 from India, 40 from Israel)
- South Vietnam: 4 AMX-13 CD armoured recovery vehicles
- Switzerland: 200 AMX-13/75s
- Tunisia: 30 AMX-13/75s

== In popular culture ==
The AMX-13 has made some major TV and film appearances, most notably in the 1984 French war film Les Morfalous, where a Tunisian Army AMX-13/75 is mocked up as a German Panzer IV medium tank serving with the Afrika Korps.

Some variants of the AMX-13 are present in the video game War Thunder:

- The AMX-13/75 (AMX-13e)
- The AMX-Chaffee
- The classic AMX-13
- Israeli AMX-13
- The AMX-13/90 C90

Some variants of the AMX-13 are also present in the video game World of Tanks:

- The AMX-13/75 (Modèle 51), AMX-13/90 (C90) and AMX-13/105 (modèle 58), as well as the initial AMX entry to the air-portable 12 tons light tank program (as "AMX 12t"), as regular French light tanks
- The AMX-13/75 Modèle 51 FL11 and AMX-13 avec Canon 57 L/100, as premium French light tanks
- The AMX-105A and AMX-13 F3, as regular French self-propelled guns.

== See also ==
=== AMX series ===
- AMX-VCI (derivative)
- Mk F3 155mm (derivative)
- AMX-10P
- AMX-10 RC
- AMX-50
- AMX-30
- AMX Leclerc
- AMX GCT

=== Vehicles of comparable role, performance, and era ===
- PT-76
- SK-105 Kürassier
- T69
