= Centurion (tank) =

British main battle tank

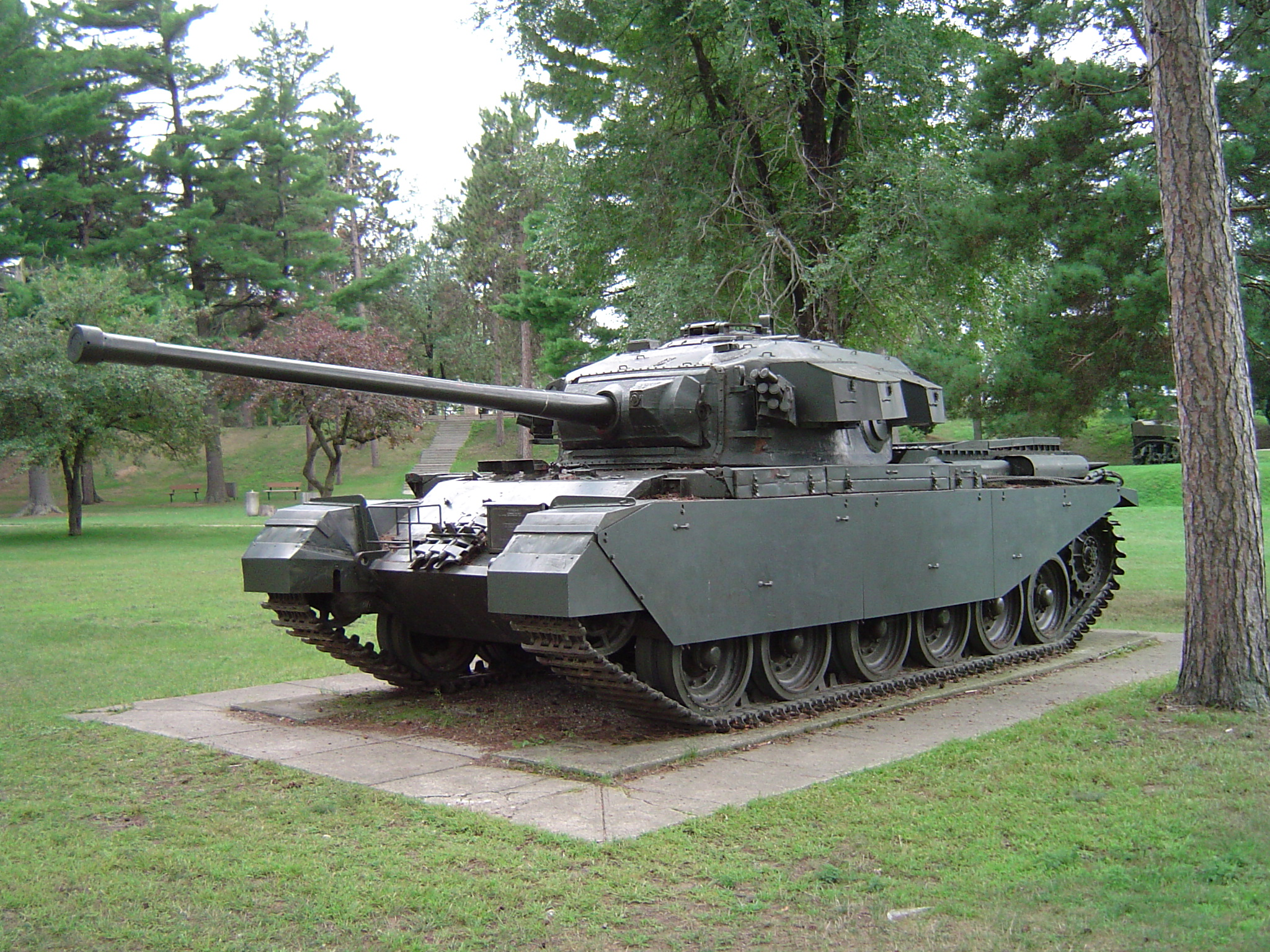
- Centurion Mk 3 tank at Worthington Tank Museum in CFB Borden (Ontario, Canada)
- Type: Main battle tank
- Place of origin: United Kingdom

Service history
- In service: 1945–present (derivatives still in service)
- Used by: see Operators
- Wars: Korean War; Suez Crisis; Indo-Pakistani War of 1965; Six-Day War; Black September; Indo-Pakistani War of 1971; War of Attrition; Yom Kippur War; Vietnam War; South African Border War; Operation Motorman (AVRE); 1978 South Lebanon conflict; BARV; 1982 Lebanon War; Somali Civil War; Gulf War (AVRE); 2006 Lebanon War; First Libyan Civil War

Production history
- Unit cost: £35,000 (1950), £38,000 (1952)
- No. built: 4,423

Specifications
- Mass: 50 long tons (51 t)
- Length: Hull only 24 ft 9.5 in (7.557 m); With gun forward 32 ft 3 in (9.83 m)
- Width: 11 ft 1 in (3.38 m) with side plates; 10 ft 9 in (3.28 m) without side plates
- Height: 9 ft 7.75 in (2.94 m)
- Crew: 4 (commander, gunner, loader, driver)
- Armour: 51–152 mm (2.0–6.0 in)
- Main armament: 105 mm L7 rifled gun; 20 pdr (84 mm) rifled gun; 17 pdr (76.2mm) rifled gun
- Secondary armament: Co-axial Besa machine gun (Mark 3) .30 cal Browning machine gun (Mark 5 onwards)
- Engine: Rolls-Royce Meteor 4B; 650 hp (480 kW) at 2550rpm
- Power/weight: 13 hp/t (9.2 kW/t)
- Transmission: 5-speed Merrit-Brown Z51R Mk. F gearbox
- Suspension: Modified Horstmann
- Ground clearance: 1 ft 8 in (0.51 m)
- Fuel capacity: 120 imperial gallons (546 L; 144 US gal)
- Operational range: 32.5 mi (52.3 km) cross country, 62.5 mi (100.6 km) on road (Marks 3, 5, and 6)
- Maximum speed: 21.5 mph (34.6 km/h)

The FV4007 (A41) Centurion was the primary main battle tank of the British Army during the post-World War II period. Introduced in 1945, it is one of the most successful post-war tank designs, remaining in production into the 1960s, and seeing combat into the 1980s. The chassis was adapted for several other roles, and these variants have remained in service. It was a very popular tank with good armour, mobility, and a powerful main armament.

Development of the Centurion began in 1943 with manufacture beginning in January 1945. Six prototypes arrived in Belgium less than a month after the war in Europe ended in May 1945. It entered combat with the British Army in the Korean War in 1950 in support of the UN forces. The Centurion later served on the Indian side in the Indo-Pakistani War of 1965, where it fought against US-supplied M47 and M48 Patton tanks, and it served with the Royal Australian Armoured Corps in the Vietnam War.

Israel's army used Centurions in the 1967 Six-Day War, the 1973 Yom Kippur War, the 1978 South Lebanon conflict, and the 1982 Lebanon War. Centurions modified as armoured personnel carriers were used in Gaza, the West Bank and on the Lebanese border. Jordan used Centurions, first in 1970 to fend off the Syrian incursion within its borders during the Jordanian Civil War and later in the Golan Heights in 1973. South Africa deployed its Centurions in Angola during the South African Border War.

The Centurion became one of the most widely used tank designs, equipping dozens of armies around the world, with some in service until the 1990s. During the 2006 Lebanon War, the Israel Defense Forces employed modified Centurions as armoured personnel carriers and combat engineering vehicles. South Africa still operates over 170 Centurions, which were modernised in the 1980s and 2000s as the Olifant (elephant).

Between 1946 and 1962, 4,423 Centurions were produced, consisting of 13 basic marks and numerous variants. In the British Army it was replaced by the Chieftain.

== Development ==
In 1943, the Directorate of Tank Design, under Sir Claude Gibb, was asked to produce a new design for a heavy cruiser tank under the General Staff designation A41. After a series of fairly mediocre designs in the A series in the past, and bearing in mind the threat posed by the German 88 mm gun, the War Office demanded a major revision of the design requirements, specifically: increased durability and reliability, the ability to withstand a direct hit from the German 88 mm gun and providing greater protection against mines. Initially in September 1943 the A41 tank was to weigh no more than 40 long tons (45 short tons; 41 t), the limit for existing Mark I and Mark II transport trailers and for a Bailey bridge of 80 ft (24 m) span. The British railway loading gauge required that the width should not exceed 10 ft 8 in (3.25 m) and the optimum width was 10 ft 3 in (3.12 m), but, critically, for the new tank this restriction had been lifted by the War Office under pressure from the Department of Tank Design. A high top speed was not important, while agility was to be equal to that of the Comet. A high reverse speed was specified, as during the fighting in southern Italy, Allied tanks were trapped in narrow sunken roads by the German Army. The modified production gearbox had a two-speed reverse, with the higher reverse speed similar to second gear.

The Department produced a larger hull by replacing the long-travel five-wheel Christie suspension used on the Comet with a six-wheel Horstmann suspension, and extending the spacing between the second and third wheels. The Christie suspension, with vertical spring coils between side armour plates, was replaced by a Horstmann suspension with three horizontally sprung, externally mounted two-wheel bogies on each side. The Horstmann design did not offer the same ride quality as the Christie system, but took up less room and was easier to maintain. In case of damage by mines, individual suspension and wheel units could be replaced relatively easily. The hull was redesigned with welded, sloped armour and featured a partially cast turret with the highly regarded 17-pounder (76.2 mm/3-inch) as the main gun and a 20 mm Polsten cannon in an independent mounting to its left. With a Rover-built Rolls-Royce Meteor engine, as used on the Comet and Cromwell, the new design would have excellent performance.

But even before the Outline Specification of the A41 was released in October 1943, these limits were removed, and the weight was increased from 40 tons to 45 long tons (50 short tons; 46 t), because of the need for heavier armour and a wider turret (too wide for the tank to be transported by rail) with a more powerful gun. The new version carried armour equal to the heaviest infantry tanks, while improved suspension and engines provided cross-country performance superior to even the early cruiser tanks. The War Office decided it would be wiser to build new trailers, rather than hamper what appeared to be a superb design. The design mockup, built by AEC Ltd, was viewed in May 1944. Subsequently, twenty pilot models were ordered with various armament combinations: ten with a 17-pounder and a 20 mm Polsten gun (of which half had a Besa machine gun in the turret rear and half an escape door), five with a 17-pounder, a forward Besa machine gun and an escape door, and five with a QF 77 mm gun and a driver-operated hull machine gun.

Prototypes of the original 40-ton design, the Centurion Mark I, had 76 mm of armour in the front glacis, which was thinner than that on the then current infantry tanks (the Churchill), which had 101 mm or 152 mm on the Churchill Mk VII and VIII being produced at the time. However, the glacis plate was highly sloped, and so the effective thickness of the armour was very high—a design feature shared by other effective designs, such as the German Panther tank and Soviet T-34. The turret was well armoured at 152 mm. The tank was also highly mobile, and easily outperformed the Comet in most tests. The uparmoured Centurion Mark II soon arrived; it had a new 118 mm-thick glacis and the side and rear armour had been increased from 38 mm to 51 mm. Only a handful of Mk I Centurions had been produced when the Mk II replaced it on the production lines. Full production began in November 1945 with an order for 800 on production lines at Leyland Motors, Lancashire the Royal Ordnance Factories ROF Leeds and Royal Arsenal, and Vickers at Elswick. The tank entered service in December 1946 with the 5th Royal Tank Regiment.

=== Continued development ===
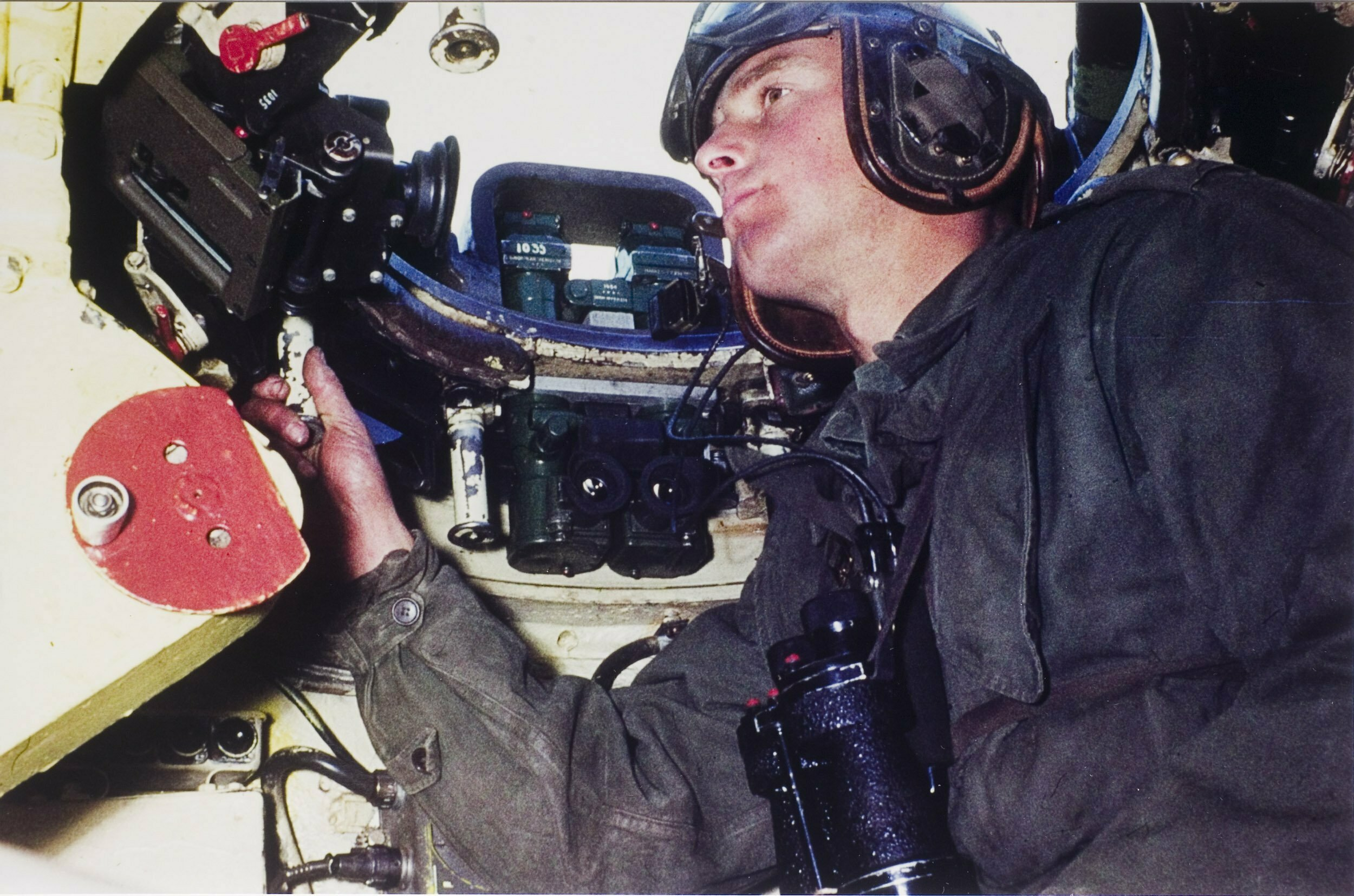
The tank commander's position in a Centurion Mk 5 in Dutch service. The handwheel on the left is used to control the main gun's elevation; his right hand is on a handle that rotates the commander's observation cupola.

Soon after the Centurion's introduction, Royal Ordnance finished work on the 84 mm calibre Ordnance QF 20 pounder tank gun. With this, the Centurion went through another upgrade to mount the 20-pounder. By this point, the usefulness of the 20 mm Polsten had been called into question, it being unnecessarily large for use against troops, so it was replaced with a Besa machine gun in a completely cast turret. The new Centurion Mark III also featured a fully automatic stabilisation system for the gun, allowing it to fire accurately while on the move, dramatically improving battlefield performance. Production of the Mk 3 began in 1948. The Mk 3 proved substantially more capable than prior variants, resulting in the earlier designs being removed from service as soon as the new Mk 3s became available, and existing tanks were then either converted into the Centurion armoured recovery vehicle (ARV) Mark 1 for use by the Royal Electrical and Mechanical Engineers or upgraded to Mk 3 standard. Improvements introduced with the Mk 3 included a more powerful version of the engine and a new gun sight and gun stabiliser.

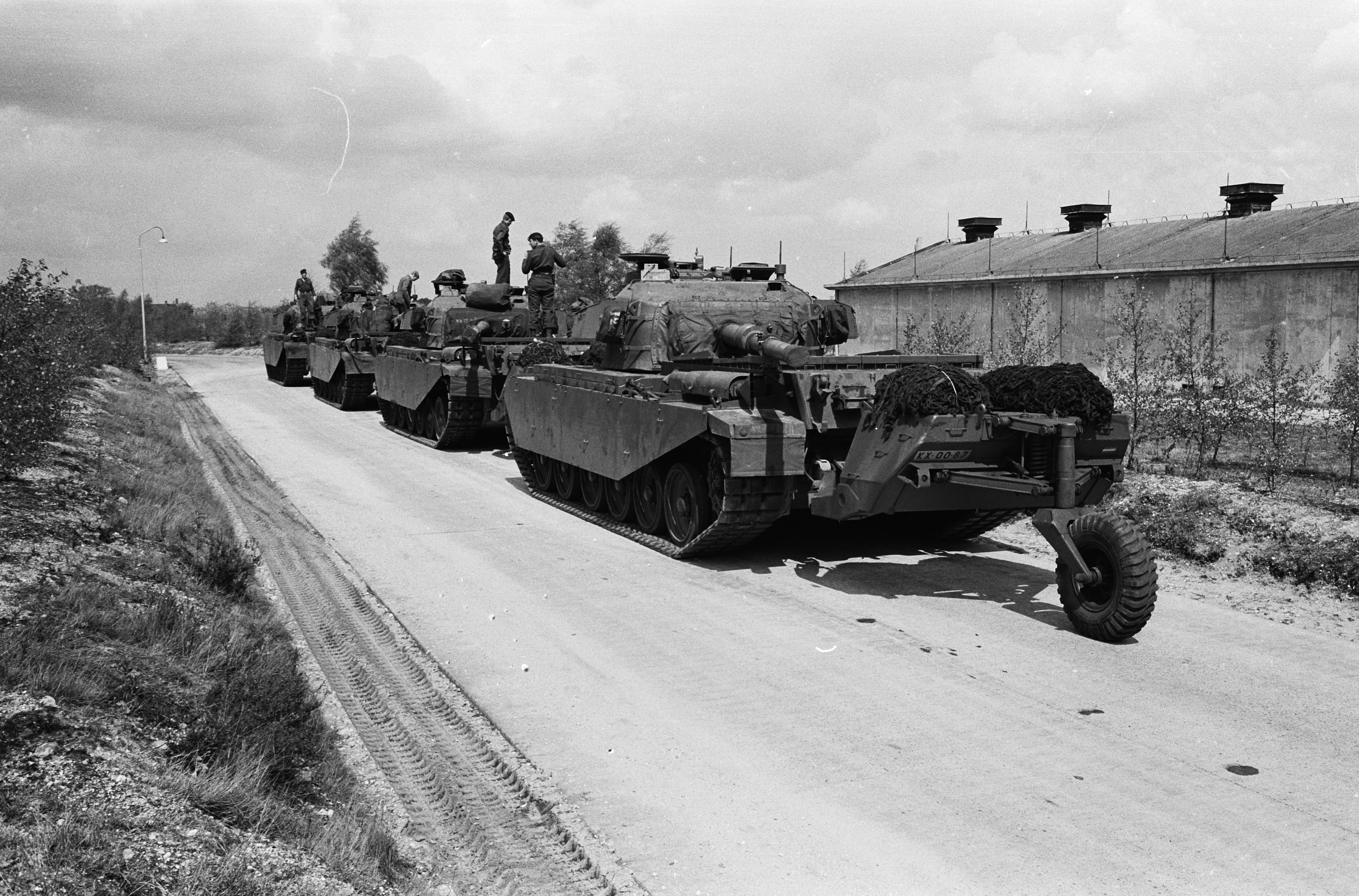
Dutch Centurions with monowheel trailers on a road march in 1963

The 20-pounder gun was used until the Royal Ordnance Factories introduced the 105 mm L7 gun in 1959. All later variants of the Centurion, from Mark 5/2 on, used the L7.

Design work for the Mk 7 was completed in 1953, with production beginning soon afterwards. One disadvantage of earlier versions was the limited range, initially just 65 miles (105 km) on hard roads, hence external auxiliary tanks and then a "monowheel" trailer were used. But the Mk7 had a third fuel tank inside the hull, giving a range of 101 miles (163 km). Additionally, it was found possible to put the Centurion on some European rail routes with their larger loading gauges.

The Centurion was used as the basis for a range of specialist equipment, including combat engineering variants with a 165 mm demolition gun Armoured Vehicle Royal Engineers (AVRE). It is one of the longest-serving designs of all time, serving as a battle tank for the British and Australian armies from the Korean War (1950–1953) to the Vietnam War (1961–1972), and as an AVRE during Operation Desert Storm in January–February 1991.

=== Production ===
The development cost of Centurion did not exceed £5 million. The cost of a Centurion tank was £35,000 in 1950, but had risen to £38,000 in 1952. (Note: John Cramer, the Australian Minister for the Army, told the Australian House of Representatives in October 1956: "the Centurion tank costs about four times as much as the 1945 tank which it replaces. Sufficient Centurion tanks, armoured personnel carriers and scout cars have been bought by this Government to equip the armoured corps with modern vehicles in place of the obsolete 1945 equipment. Some of the major items purchased under the mobilization programme in the last two years may be of interest to honorable members and to many people outside. We have now the following equipment: - 119 Centurion tanks, each of which cost £48,000...". In the period 1954-56, 1,000 Australian pounds were worth 796.43 British pounds. So 48,000 Australian pounds converts to 38,229 British pounds.) Of this, "the gun control equipment costs £1,600, and the actual gadget that works the stabiliser only £100." By comparison, during World War II a Covenanter tank cost the British Government £12,000, a Crusader tank cost £13,700, a Matilda tank cost £18,000, and a Valentine tank £14,900; (Note: It was stated in the House of Commons in 1952 that a Cromwell tank in 1945 had cost £10,000. This figure was a 1941 estimate of the basic price of a Cromwell tank, a type of tank that went into production in January 1943.) in 1967 a Chieftain tank cost between £90,000 and £95,000, and in 1984 a Challenger 1 tank cost £1.5 million. In 1955, Sir Edward Boyle (the Parliamentary Secretary to the Minister of Supply) told the House of Commons that "the cost of the Centurion tank has been coming down recently as production has settled into its stride."

| Financial Year | Centurion Production | | | | | | | | |
| Financial Year | Mark 1 | Mark 2 | Mark 3 | Mark 5 | Mark 7 | Mark 8 | Mark 9 | Mark 10 | Total |
|---|---|---|---|---|---|---|---|---|---|
| 1945/46 | | 1 | | | | | | | 1 |
| 1946/47 | 48 | 57 | | | | | | | 105 |
| 1947/48 | 52 | 192 | 30 | | | | | | 274 |
| 1948/49 | | | 139 | | | | | | 139 |
| 1949/50 | | | 193 | | | | | | 193 |
| 1950/51 | | | 229 | | | | | | 229 |
| 1951/52 | | | 500 | | | | | | 500 |
| 1952/53 | | | 573 | | | | | | 573 |
| 1953/54 | | | 565 | | 1 | | | | 566 |
| 1954/55 | | | 359 | | 154 | | | | 513 |
| 1955/56 | | | 245 | 36 | 129 | 11 | | | 421 |
| 1956/57 | | | | 176 | 168 | 51 | | | 395 |
| 1957/58 | | | | 9 | 131 | 16 | | | 156 |
| 1958/59 | | | | | 78 | 16 | | | 94 |
| 1959/60 | | | | | 94 | 14 | 1 | 29 | 138 |
| 1960/61 | | | | | | | | 110 | 110 |
| 1961/62 | | | | | | | | 16 | 16 |
| Total | 100 | 250 | 2,833 | 221 | 755 | 108 | 1 | 155 | 4,429 |

== Service history ==
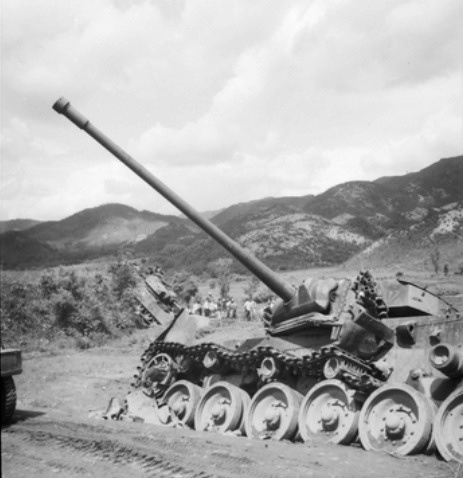
Centurions of the 8th Hussars disabled during the retreat of 29th Brigade on 25 April 1951 in the Battle of the Imjin River in Korea

=== Korean War ===
On 14 November 1950, the British Army's 8th King's Royal Irish Hussars, equipped with three squadrons (64 tanks) of Centurion Mk 3, landed in Pusan. The first recorded Centurion kill occurred near Seoul against a North Korean captured Cromwell tank. Operating in sub-zero temperatures, the 8th Hussars learnt the rigors of winter warfare: their tanks had to be parked on straw to prevent the steel tracks from freezing to the ground. Engines had to be started every half-hour, with each gear being engaged in turn to prevent them from being frozen into place. During the Battle of the Imjin River, Centurions won lasting fame when they covered the withdrawal of the 29th Brigade, with the loss of five tanks, most later recovered and repaired. In 1952, Centurions of the 5th Royal Inniskilling Dragoon Guards were also involved in the Second Battle of the Hook where they played a significant role in repelling Chinese attacks. Centurions of the 1st Royal Tank Regiment participated in the Third Battle of the Hook repelling the PLA and also were involved in the Battle of the Samichon River in 1953. In a tribute to the 8th Hussars, General John O'Daniel, commanding the US 1st Corps, stated: "In their Centurions, the 8th Hussars have evolved a new type of tank warfare. They taught us that anywhere a tank can go, is tank country: even the tops of mountains." However, the lack of pintle-mounted machine guns on the turret meant that the Centurion was only able to fire in one direction and so was vulnerable to infantry attacks.

=== Deployment in Western Europe ===
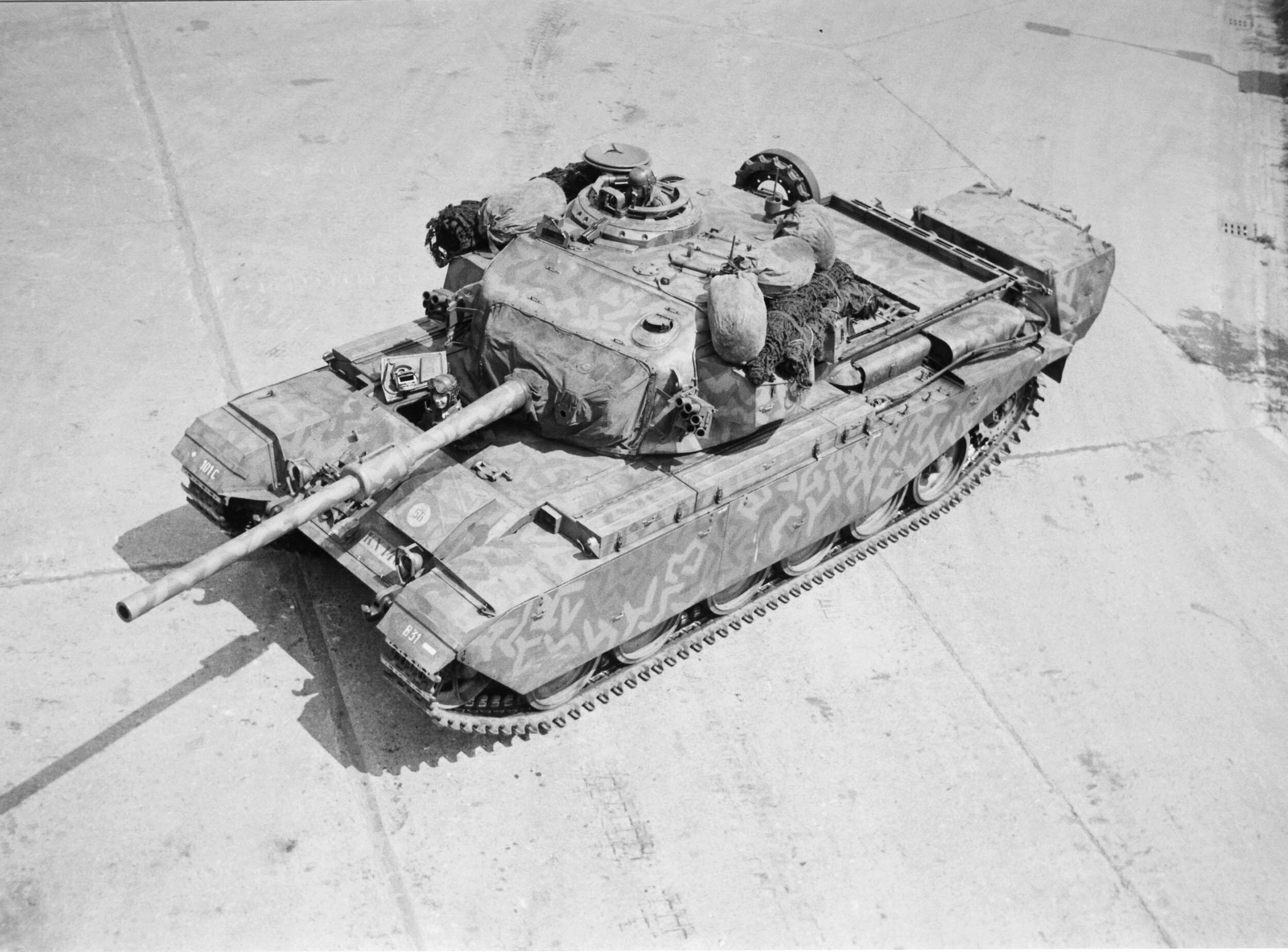
Dutch Centurion Mk 5/1 with an early camouflage scheme, 1965.

By early 1952, with the Cold War heating up, NATO needed modern heavy tanks to meet the T-34 versions with the Warsaw Pact countries, and to deter Soviet forces by stationing them with the BAOR in West Germany, where the French had just the light AMX-13, and the Germans had none. America was keen to have Centurions supplied to Denmark and the Netherlands under the Mutual Defence Assistance Program, as production of the M48 Patton would not start until April 1952. A Mk 3 cost £31,000 or £44,000 with ammunition. The Royal Canadian Armoured Corps deployed a regiment of Centurions to Germany to support the Canadian Brigade.

=== Suez Crisis ===
During the Suez Crisis, British ground commander General Sir Hugh Stockwell believed that methodical and systematic armoured operations centred on the Centurion would be the key to victory.

The Egyptians destroyed Port Said's Inner Harbour, which forced the British to improvise and use the Fishing Harbour to land their forces. The 2nd Brigade of the Parachute Regiment landed by ship in the harbour. Centurions of the British 6th Royal Tank Regiment were landed and by 12:00 they had reached the French paratroopers. While the British were landing at Port Said, the men of the 2 RPC at Raswa fought off Egyptian counter-attacks featuring SU-100 tank destroyers.

After establishing themselves in a position in downtown Port Said, 42 Commando headed down the Shari Muhammad Ali, the main north–south road to link up with the French forces at the Raswa bridge and the Inner Basin lock. While doing so, the Marines also took Port Said's gasworks. Meanwhile, 40 Commando supported by the Royal Tank Regiment remained engaged in clearing the downtown of Egyptian snipers. Lieutenant Colonel Norman Tailyour arranged for more reinforcements to be brought in via helicopter.

=== Vietnam War ===
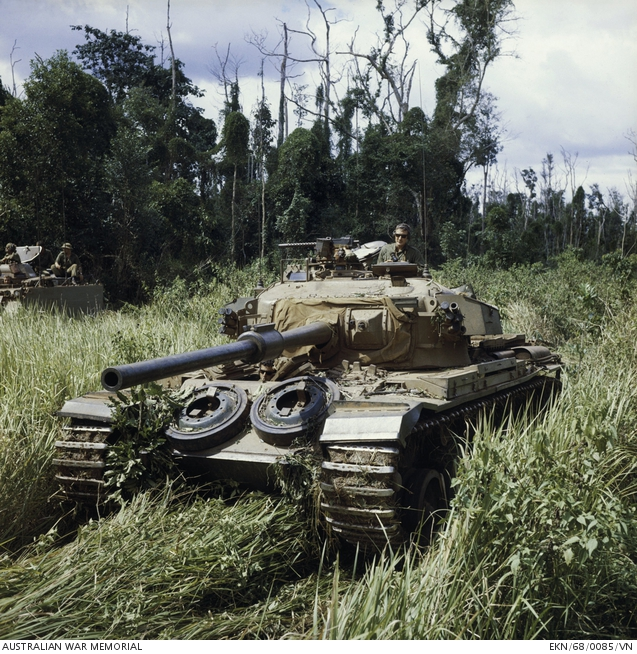
An Australian Centurion tank during an operation in South Vietnam during 1968

In 1967, the Royal Australian Armoured Corps' (RAAC), 1st Armoured Personnel Carrier (APC) Squadron transferred to "A" Squadron, 3rd Cavalry Regiment in South Vietnam. Although they successfully conducted combat operations in their areas of operations, reports from the field stated that their lightly armoured M113A1 armoured personnel carriers were unable to force their way through dense jungle limiting their offensive actions against enemy forces. The Australian government, under criticism in Parliament, decided to send a squadron of Australian Centurion tanks to South Vietnam. The 20-pdr armed Australian Centurions of 'C' Squadron, 1st Armoured Regiment landed in South Vietnam on 24 February 1968, being headquartered at Nui Dat in III Corps (MR3).

Colonel Donald Dunstan, later to be governor of South Australia, was the deputy task force commander of the 1st Australian Task Force (1 ATF) in South Vietnam. Dunstan had quite possibly been the last Australian to use tanks and infantry in a combined operation during the Second World War (as part of the Bougainville campaign), and the first since the war to command Australia's tanks and infantry in combat. When he temporarily took over command during Brigadier Ronald Hughes's absence, he directed that the Centurions be brought up from Nui Dat to reinforce firebases Coral and Balmoral, believing that they were a strong element that were not being used. Besides adding a great deal of firepower, Dunstan stated, he "couldn't see any reason why they [the Centurions] shouldn't be there". His foresight enabled 1 ATF to kill approximately 267 soldiers from the 141st and 165th North Vietnamese Army Regiments during the six-week-long Battle of Coral–Balmoral in May 1968, as well as capturing 11 prisoners, 36 crew-served weapons, 112 small arms, and other miscellaneous enemy weapons.

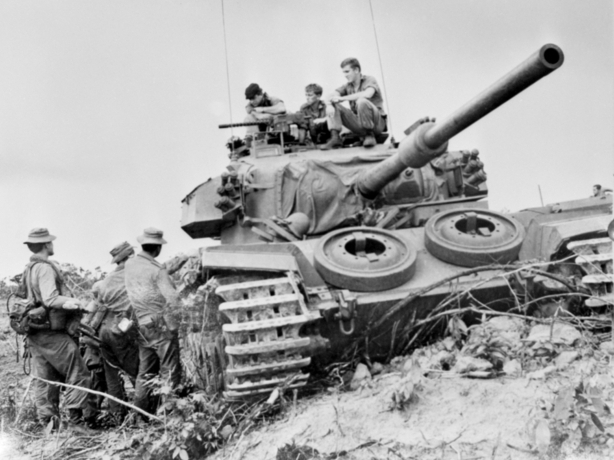
The crew of an Australian Centurion speaking with soldiers during an operation in South Vietnam during 1968

After the Battle of Coral-Balmoral, a third Centurion troop, which included two tankdozers, was formed. By September 1968, 'C' Squadron was brought to its full strength of four troops, each equipped with four Centurion tanks. By 1969, 'B' Squadron, 3rd Cavalry; 'A' Squadron, 1st Armoured Regiment; 'B' Squadron, 1st Armoured Regiment; and 'C' Squadron, 1st Armoured Regiment, had all made rotations through South Vietnam. Originally deployed as 26 Centurion tanks, after three and a half years of combat operations, 58 Centurions had served in country; 42 had suffered battle damage with six beyond repair and two crewmen had been killed in action.

The Centurion crews, after operating for a few weeks in country, soon learned to remove the protective armoured side skirts from both sides of the tank, to prevent the vegetation and mud from building up between the track and the mudguards. Each Centurion in Vietnam normally carried a basic load of 62 rounds of 20 pounder shells, 4,000 rounds of .50 cal and 9,000 rounds of .30 cal machine gun ammunition for the tank commander's machine gun as well as the two coaxial machine guns. They were equipped with petrol engines, which necessitated the use of an extra externally mounted 100-imperial-gallon (450 L) fuel tank, which was attached to the vehicle's rear.

=== Indo-Pakistani wars ===
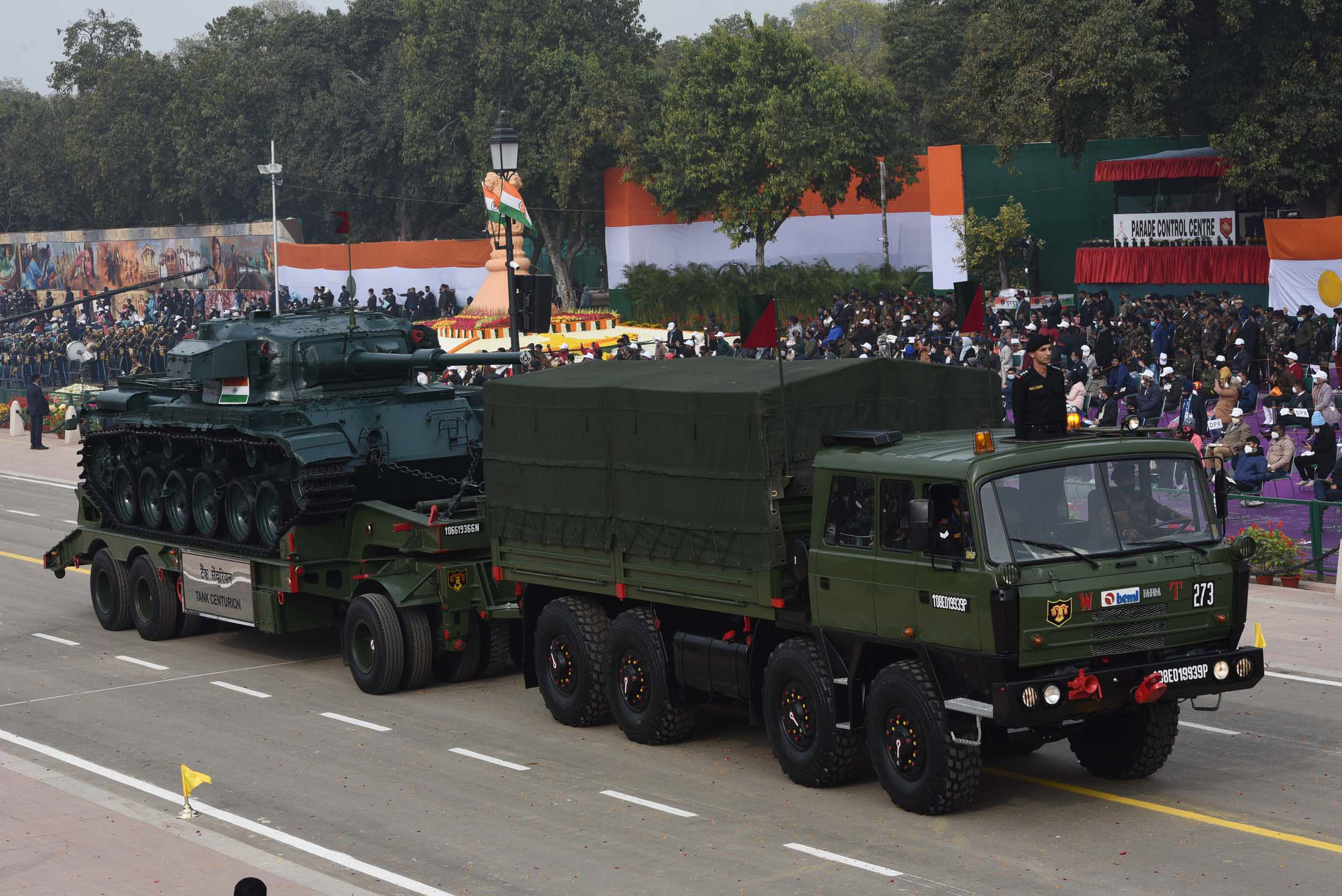
Indian Centurion tank paraded during 73rd Republic day celebration

In 1965, the bulk of India's tank fleet was older M4 Sherman tanks, but India also had Centurion Mk.7 tanks, with the 20-pounder gun, and also AMX-13 and M3 Stuart light tanks. The Centurion Mk.7 at that time was one of the most modern western tanks.

The offensive of Pakistan's 1st Armoured Division was blunted at the Battle of Asal Uttar on 10 September. Six Pakistani armoured regiments were opposed by three Indian armoured regiments. One of these regiments, 3 Cavalry, fielded 45 Centurion tanks. The Centurion, with its 20-pounder gun and heavy armour, proved to be more than a match for the M47 and M48 Pattons. On the other side, when Pakistani Army armoured division primary composed of M47 and M48 Pattons, they proved to be able to penetrate only a few of the Centurion tanks, as witnessed in the Battle of Chawinda in the Sialkot sector. A post-war US study of the tank battles in South Asia concluded that the Patton's armour could be penetrated by the 20-pounder tank gun (84 mm) of the Centurion (later replaced by the even more successful L7 105 mm gun on the Mk. 7 version which India also possessed) as well as the 75 mm tank gun of the AMX-13 light tank.

Pakistani soldiers sitting on a captured Indian Centurion tank.

In 1971, at the Battle of Basantar, an armoured division and an armoured brigade of the Pakistani I Corps confronted two armoured brigades of the Indian I Corps, which had Centurion tanks. This resulted in a substantial tank battle, between the American-built tanks of the Pakistani Army and the Indian Army's mixture of Soviet T-55s and British Centurions. Casualties were heavily skewed against the Pakistani force, with 46 tanks destroyed.

=== Middle East ===
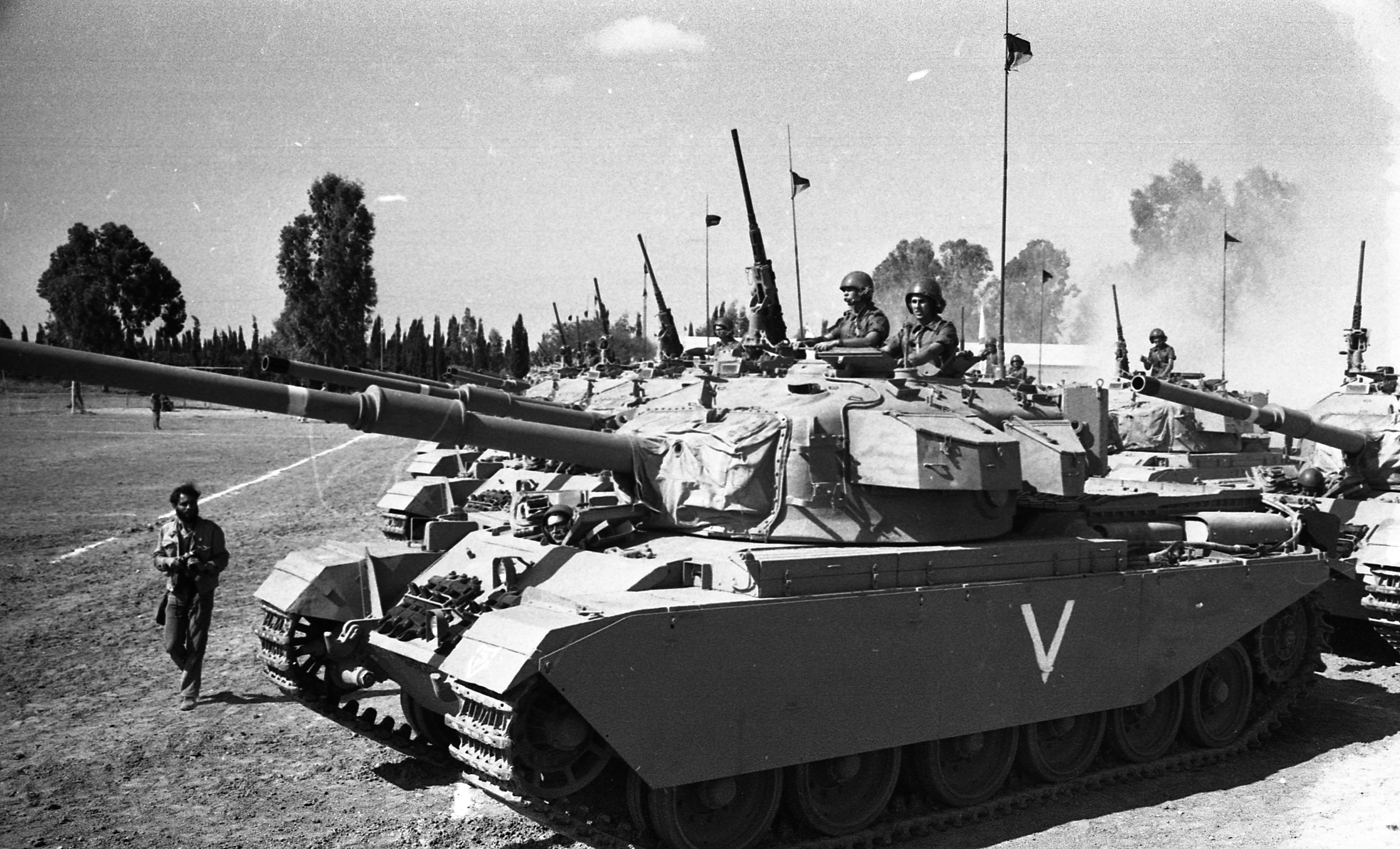
Israeli Sho't variant (Centurion up-gunned with the 105 mm L7 cannon) in 1969

The first country which bought Centurion tanks was Egypt. The first tanks were received in 1950. Israel's formerly British Centurions were first delivered in 1959. Differing varieties of the Centurion were bought by Israel over the years from many different countries or captured in combat. Following their acquisition the Israelis quickly upgraded the tanks with British 105 mm L7 instead of the original 20-pounder main gun and renamed them Sho't ("scourge" or "whip").

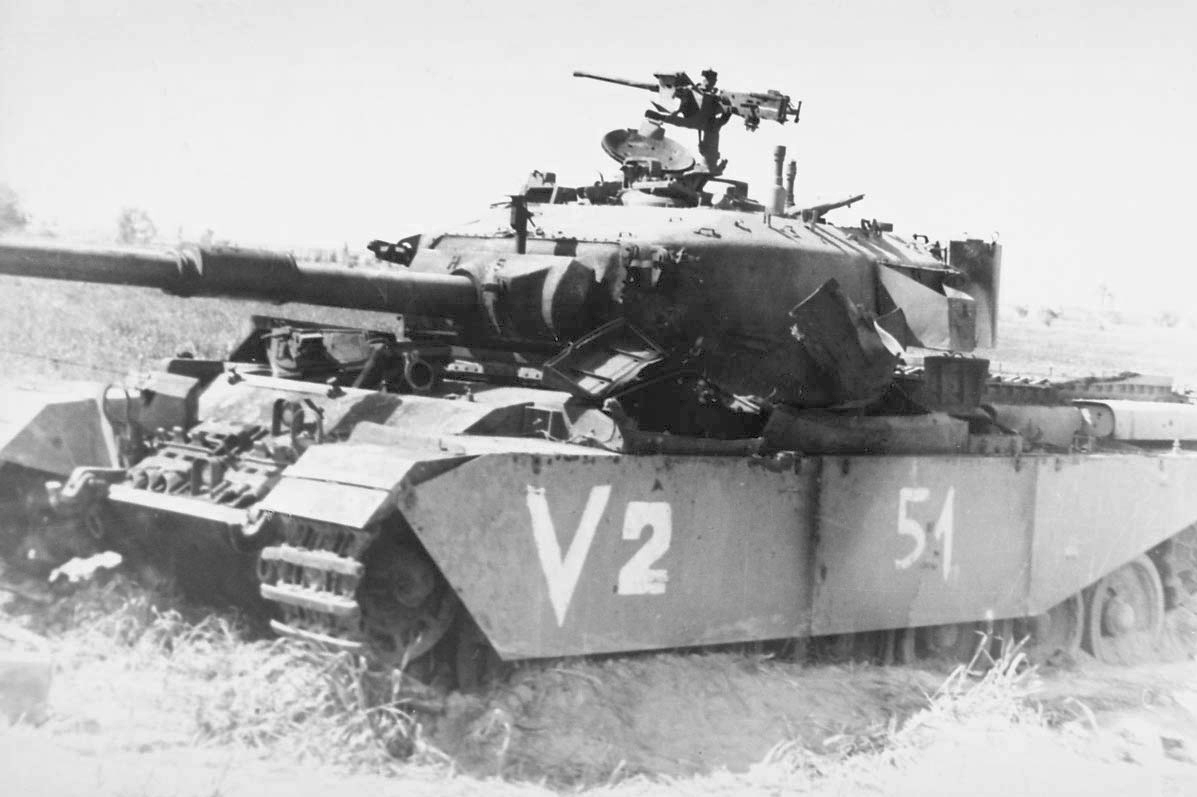
Disabled Israeli Centurion in the aftermath of the Battle of Karameh

When the Six-Day War broke out in 1967, the Israel Defense Forces (IDF) had 293 Centurion / Sho't tanks that were ready for combat out of a total of 385 tanks. In Sinai, Egypt had 30 Centurion tanks. All 30 Egyptian tanks were destroyed or captured by Israel during the conflict. Israel also captured about 30 Jordanian Centurion tanks from a total of 90 in Jordanian service. 25 tanks were abandoned in Hebron by the 10th Jordanian Independent Tank Regiment.

All Sho't tanks were upgraded with the more efficient Continental AVDS-1790-2A diesel engine (also used in the M48 and the M60 tanks) and an Allison CD-850-6 transmission from 1970 to 1974. The upgraded version was named Sho't Kal Alef, and was later followed by three additional sub-variants called Bet, Gimel and Dalet according to the upgrades added. The upgrades included thicker armour, new turret rotating mechanism, new gun stabiliser, improved ammunition layout with more rounds, and increased fuel capacity. A modern fire control system, an improved fire extinguisher system, better electrical system and brakes, and the capability of installing reactive armour completed the modifications. They had American radios and either the original 7.62 mm calibre MG on the commander's cupola or a 12.7 mm calibre HMG. The Sho't Kal could be distinguished from the Centurion by its raised rear deck, to accommodate the bigger engine.

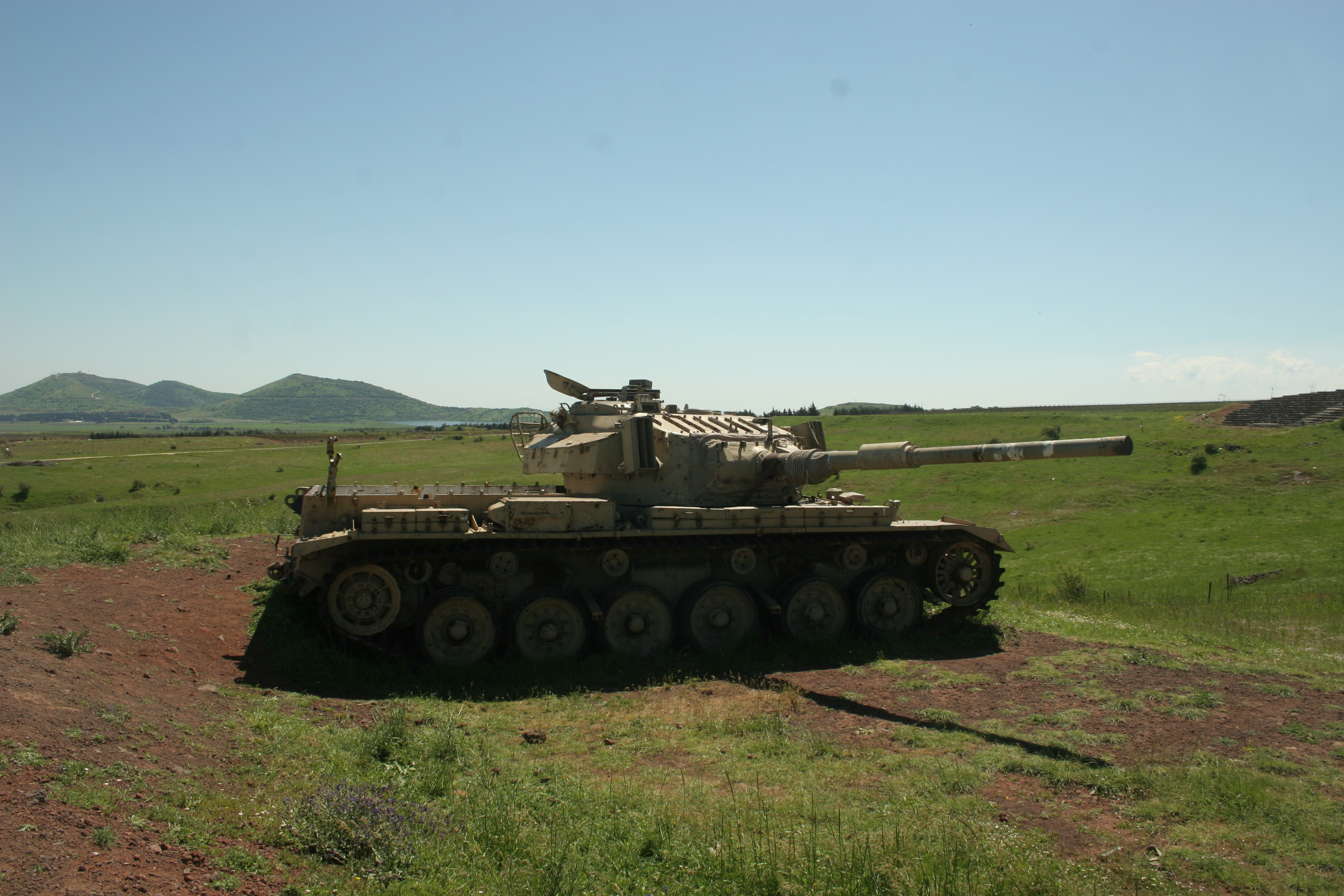
A Sho't tank in a memorial near the Valley of Tears, Golan Heights

The Sho't Kal version of Centurion earned its legendary status during the Battle of "The Valley of Tears" on the Golan Heights in the 1973 Yom Kippur War. 105 Sho't Kal tanks of the 7th Armoured Brigade and 20 Sho't tanks of the 188th Brigade defeated the advance of some 500 Syrian T-55s and T-62s and the Sho't Kal became emblematic of Israeli armour's prowess. During the entire war, 1,063 Israeli tanks were disabled (more than half of them Centurions), about 600 of which were completely destroyed or captured. Some 35 Israeli Centurions were captured by Egypt, dozens more were captured by Syria and Iraq and four by Jordan. On the other hand, 2,250 Arab tanks were disabled (including 33 Jordanian Centurions, 18 of them destroyed), 1,274 of them were destroyed or captured (643 tanks were lost in the north and 631 were lost in the south). After the war, to replace Israeli losses, the United States delivered 200 M60 and M48 tanks and the United Kingdom delivered 400 Centurion tanks to Israel.

Sho't Kal tanks with Blazer reactive armour package were used in the 1982 invasion of Lebanon. During the war, 21 Centurion tanks were knocked out, of which 8 were destroyed.

The Israelis started to retire the Sho't Kal during the 1980s and they were completely retired during the 2000s. Most of them were converted to Nagmasho't, Nagmachon, and Nakpadon (heavy armoured personnel carriers or Infantry Fighting Vehicles) and Puma armoured engineering vehicles.

=== Jordan ===
Fifty Centurions were purchased by Jordan between 1954 and 1956 and by 1967 about 90 Centurions were in service. The Jordanian Army used its Centurion tanks in the Six-Day War. In 1967, the 10th Independent Tank Regiment was equipped with 44 Centurion Mk.V tanks armed with 20pdr guns, but was initially deployed on the East Bank. Later, the unit was moved urgently to the Hebron area, in West Bank, in order to link with the supposed Egyptian advance. Some Centurion tanks were destroyed and about 30 captured by the Israeli Army. Israelis entering Hebron captured 25 Jordanian Centurion tanks. The Royal Guards Brigade had one regiment that was also equipped with Centurions.

After the 1967 war, the army was rearmed and more Centurion tanks were purchased.

In September 1970 (Black September) Jordan used Centurions of the 40th Armoured Brigade against invading Syrian T-55 tanks. Jordan lost 75 to 90 tanks out of 200 involved. Most of them were destroyed by Syrian tank fire at ar-Ramtha, while others were destroyed by the PLO in Amman. Palestinians used captured Centurion tanks against the Jordanian army.

In 1972, Centurion tanks were reequipped with 105 mm guns. During the Yom Kippur War, the Jordanian 40th Armoured Brigade was deployed in the Golan front to support Syrian troops and show King Hussein's concern for Arab solidarity. The 40th Armoured Brigade moved northward towards Sheikh Meskin, but its counterattack was uncoordinated and largely ineffective as the Israelis were in prepared defensive positions.

In 1982–1985, 293 surviving Centurions of the Jordanian Army were refitted with the diesel engine and transmission of the M60A1 tank in place of the original Meteor petrol engine, Belgian SABCA computerised fire-control system, which incorporated a laser range-finder and passive night sight for the gunner, Cadillac Gage electro-hydraulic turret drive and stabilisation system and a new Teledyne Continental hydropneumatic suspension in place of the Horstmann units. These upgraded vehicles were called the Tariq. After retirement from service with the arrival of ex-British Challenger tanks in the late 1990s, several Tariqs were converted into heavy APCs (Dawsar).

=== British use of Centurion AVREs ===
In 1972 during Operation Motorman in Northern Ireland, 165mm-armed Armoured Vehicle Royal Engineers (AVREs) with dozer blades were used to destroy barricades set up by the IRA in Northern Ireland. The 165mm demolition guns were pointed to the rear and covered up.

During Operation Desert Storm in 1991, 12 FV4003 Centurion Mk5 AVREs were deployed with 32 Armoured Engineer Regiment as part of British operations during the campaign. Three were lost in training in two separate incidents involving vehicle fires and detonation of munitions. One AVRE was destroyed on 5 February 1991 and two were destroyed in a second incident the next day. Four minor injuries were sustained. No AVRES saw action during the operation.

=== South Africa ===
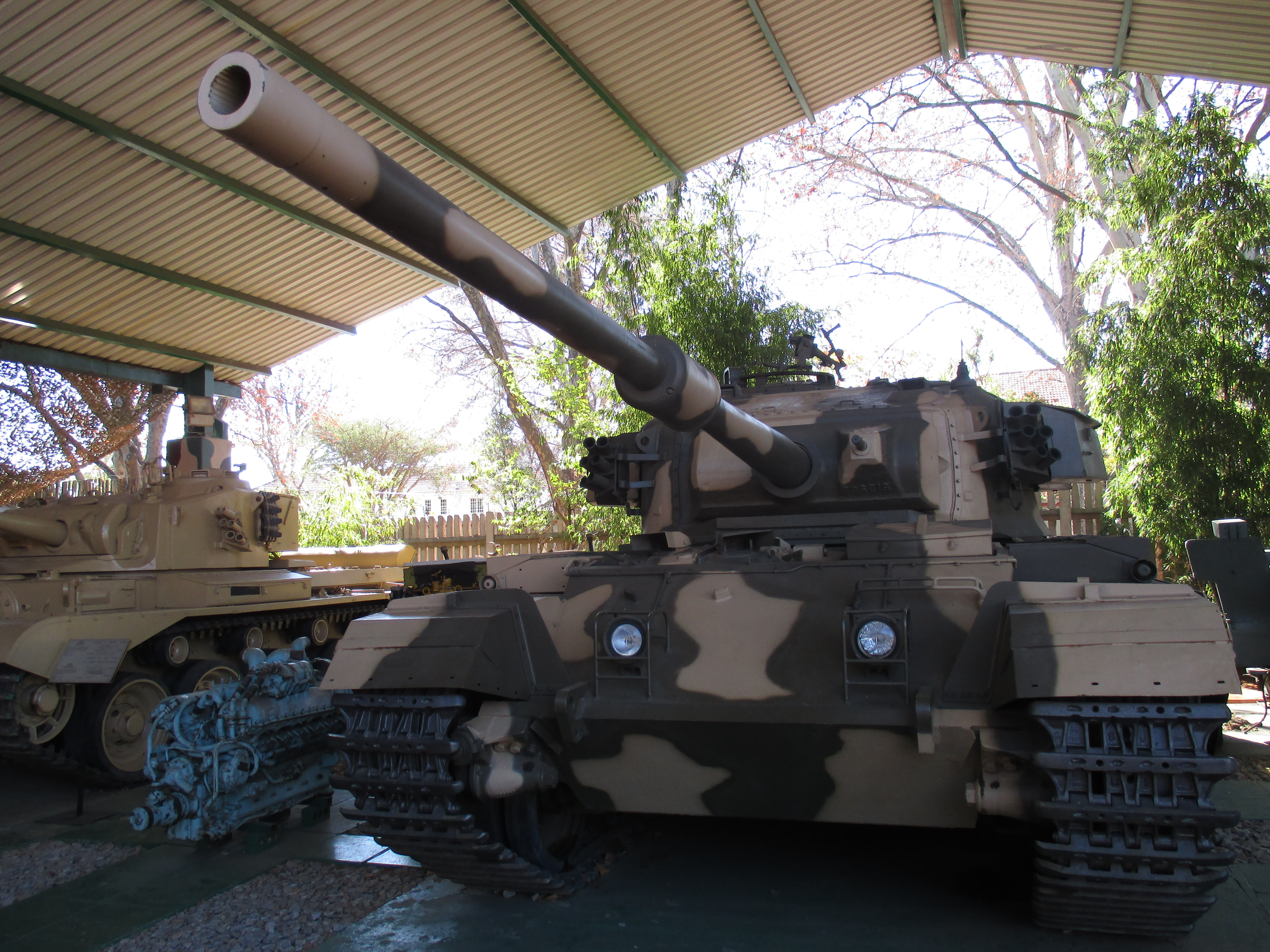
Modified South African Centurion Mk 5

South Africa ordered 203 Centurion Mk 3 tanks from the United Kingdom in 1953. The South African Centurions entered service between 1955 and 1958, and included about 17 armoured recovery vehicles. South Africa's major strategic priorities at the time revolved around assisting the British Armed Forces and other member states of the Commonwealth of Nations during a conventional war in the Middle East or Anglophone Africa. The Centurions were procured specifically because they were compatible with Commonwealth tank tactics and pre-existing British armoured formations.

Following South Africa's withdrawal from the Commonwealth in 1961, its priorities shifted toward internal security and diversifying national arms procurement outside traditional suppliers such as the United Kingdom. To that end, 100 Centurion Mk 3s and 10 Centurion-based recovery vehicles were sold off to Switzerland in 1961. The remaining Centurions were largely relegated to reserve roles as a result of maintenance problems compounded by parts shortages and a tendency to overheat in the hot African climate. In 1972, the South African Army retrofitted some of its Centurions with the engines and transmission of American-made M48 Patton tanks in an attempt to improve technical performance. The upgraded Centurions were designated Skokiaan and proved unpopular due to their high fuel consumption and poor operating range.

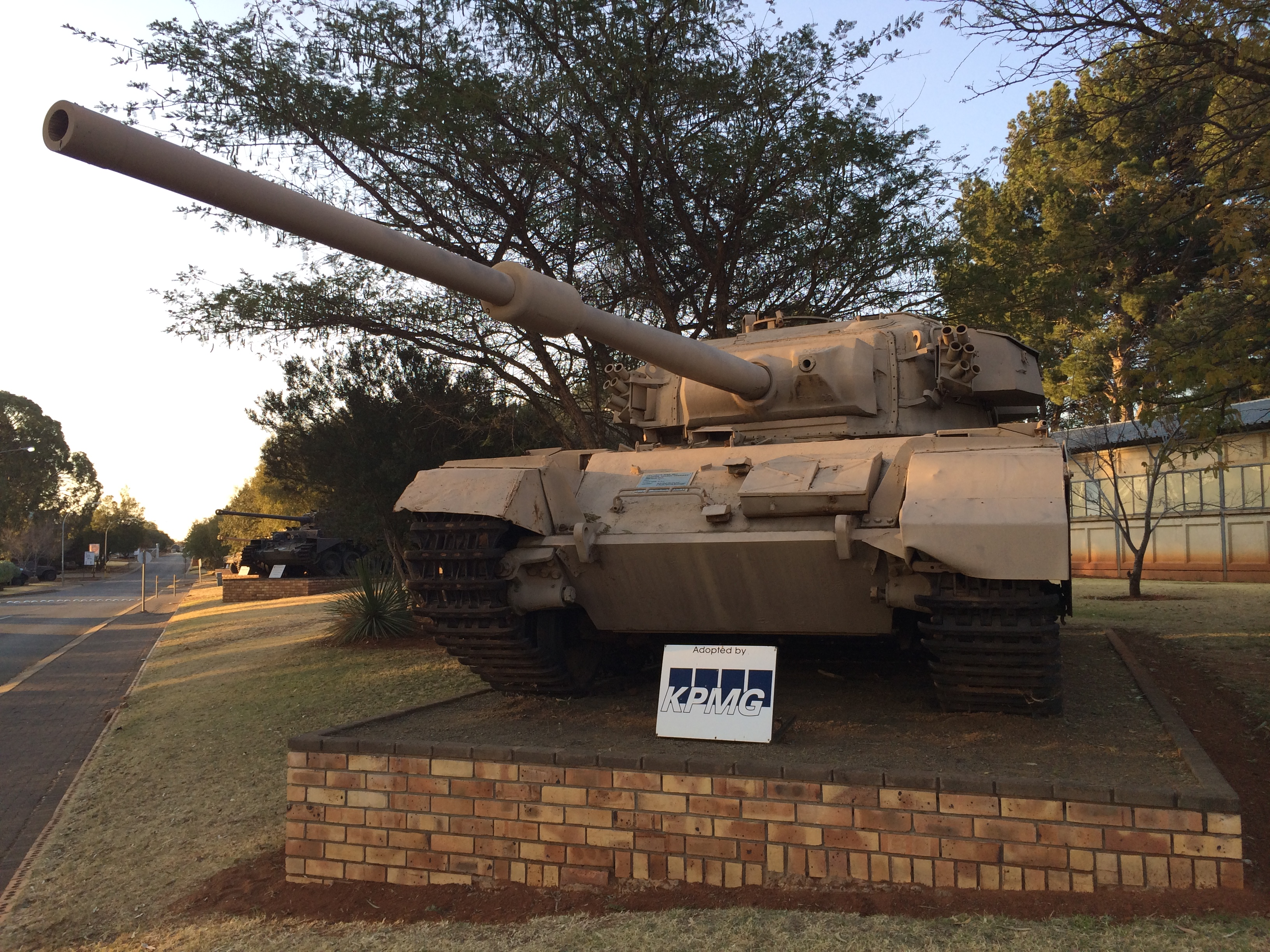
The first Skokiaan prototype

Tanks reentered the mainstream of South African military doctrine in 1975, following Operation Savannah, which saw the lightly armoured South African forces in Angola threatened by large formations of Soviet tanks supplied to the People's Armed Forces for the Liberation of Angola (FAPLA) and their Cuban allies. Operation Savannah was followed by further modifications and trials under Project Semel, and the South African government was obliged to finance the creation of a new private sector enterprise, the Olifant Manufacturing Company (OMC), to refurbish the Centurions. During this period South Africa managed to restore its tank fleet to its original size by purchasing a number of surplus Centurion hulls from Jordan and India. The passage of United Nations Security Council Resolution 418, which imposed a mandatory arms embargo on the country, forced South Africa to purchase the hulls without turrets or armament. OMC upgraded each Centurion with a 29-litre Continental turbocharged diesel engine and a new transmission adopted from the M60 Patton. The refurbished Centurions were also armed with a South African variant of the Royal Ordnance L7 105 mm main gun. They were accepted into service with the South African Armoured Corps as the Olifant Mk1A in 1985.

South African expeditionary forces clashed with FAPLA T-54/55 tanks during Operation Askari in late 1983 and early 1984; however, due to the enormous logistical commitment needed to keep the Olifants operational so far from conventional repair facilities, they were not deployed. At length the South African mechanised infantry, bolstered by Eland and Ratel-90 armoured car squadrons, succeeded in destroying the tanks on their own, although severe delays were encountered due to their lack of adequate anti-tank weaponry. Morale also suffered when inexperienced armoured car crews were ordered to take on the Angolan T-54/55s in their vulnerable vehicles. Criticism in this regard led to the deployment of a single squadron of thirteen Olifant Mk1As to the Angolan border, where they were attached to the 61 Mechanised Battalion Group. Following the Lusaka Accords, which effectively ensured a ceasefire between South Africa and Angola, these Olifants were placed into storage and the tank crews rotated out.

Olifant Mk2

The collapse of the Lusaka Accords and the subsequent launch of Operation Moduler in late 1987 led to the Olifant squadron being reactivated on the direct orders of South African State President P.W. Botha. On 9 November 1987 the Olifants destroyed two Angolan T-55s during a heated nine-minute skirmish. This marked the first occasion South African tanks had been sent into battle since World War II. Throughout Operation Moduler, South African forces typically dispersed into an "arrowhead" formation, with Olifants in the lead, Ratel-90 armoured cars on the flanks, and the remainder of the mechanised infantry to the rear and centre. Three Olifants were abandoned in a minefield during Operation Packer and subsequently captured by FAPLA, while another two were damaged beyond immediate repair by mines but successfully recovered. A number of others suffered varying degrees of track and suspension damage due to mines or Angolan tank fire, but were able to keep moving after field repairs.

In the early 1990s, the Olifant Mk1A was superseded by the Olifant Mk1B, which incorporated major improvements in armour protection, a slightly more powerful engine, a double armoured floor for protection against mines, and a torsion bar suspension.

=== Sweden ===
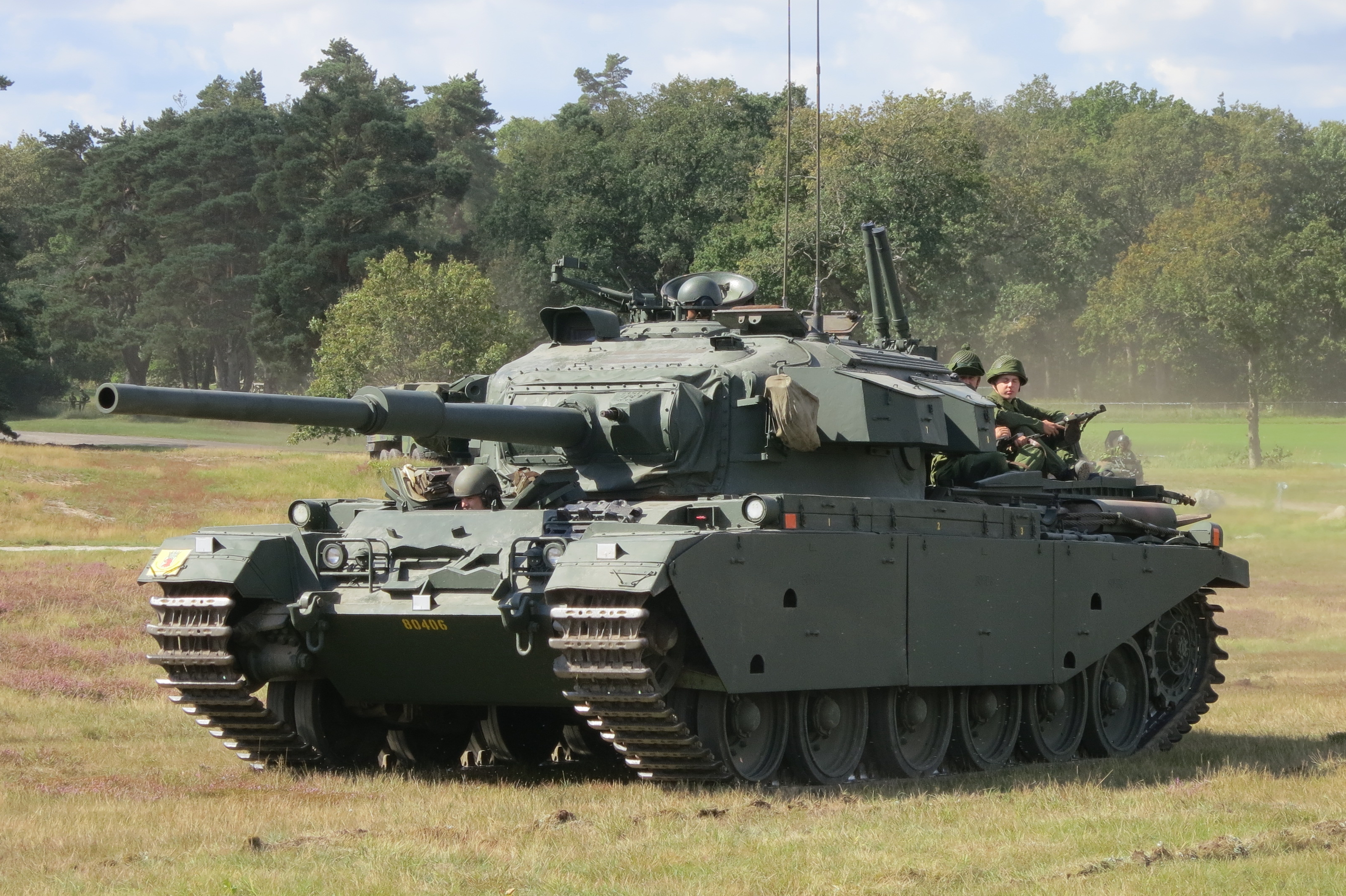
Stridsvagn 102

At the end of the Second World War, it was clear that the mix of tanks in service with the Swedish Armed Forces was not just obsolete but also presented a large logistical problem. Kungliga Arméförvaltningens Tygavdelning (KAFT, the weapons bureau of the army administrative service) conducted a study that concluded that the most cost-effective alternative would be to purchase the newly developed Centurion Mk 3, which, while quite modern, was judged to also have upgrade potential for future requirements. A purchase request was sent to Great Britain, but the reply was that no deliveries could be made before the needs of the British Army had been satisfied, which it was estimated would take between five and 15 years. Thus, in 1951, the vehicle bureau of KAFT was set to develop a Swedish alternative project, E M I L. Parallel with this, negotiations were initiated with France about buying the AMX-13.

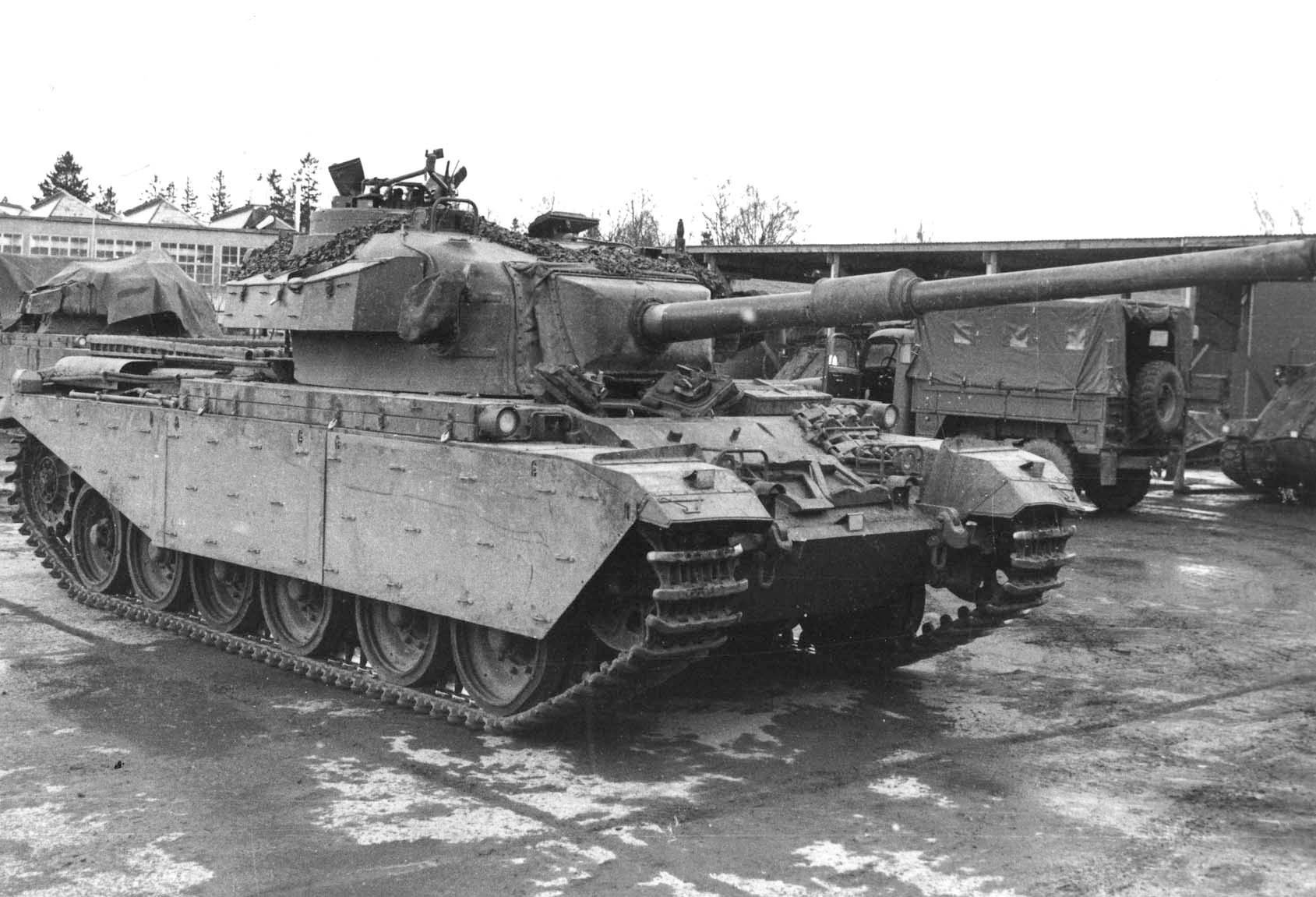
Strv 101 (Swedish Centurion Mk 10)

The British stance altered in early December 1952, due to the economic necessity of increasing exports to earn scarce foreign currency. Britain offered to sell the desired Centurions immediately. Minister of Defence Torsten Nilsson arbitrarily placed an order of 80 Mk 3, with Swedish Army designation Stridsvagn 81 (Strv 81), around new year 1952/1953, with the first delivery in April 1953. In 1955, Sweden ordered a batch of 160 Centurion Mk 5 (also designated Strv 81), followed by a batch of 110 Centurion Mk 10 around 1960 (designated Strv 101). The Centurions, together with the Stridsvagn 103, formed the backbone of the Swedish armoured brigades for several decades. The Mk 3 and the Mk 5 were upgraded with a 105 mm gun in the 1960s, becoming Strv 102.

Between 1983 and 1987, the Centurions had a midlife renovation and modification (REMO) done, which included among other things night vision equipment, targeting systems, laser range finders, improved gun stabilisation, thermal sleeves on the barrel and exhaust pipes and reactive armour developed by the Swedish FFV Ordnance. Around 80 Strv 102 were upgraded with Continental diesel engines and Allison gearboxes in the early 1980s, becoming Strv 104.

The Swedish Army gradually phased out its Centurions and Strv 103s during the 1990s as a consequence of comparative tests of the T-72, Leclerc, M1A2 and Leopard 2 Improved They were replaced with the Stridsvagn 121 and Stridsvagn 122.

=== Nuclear tests ===
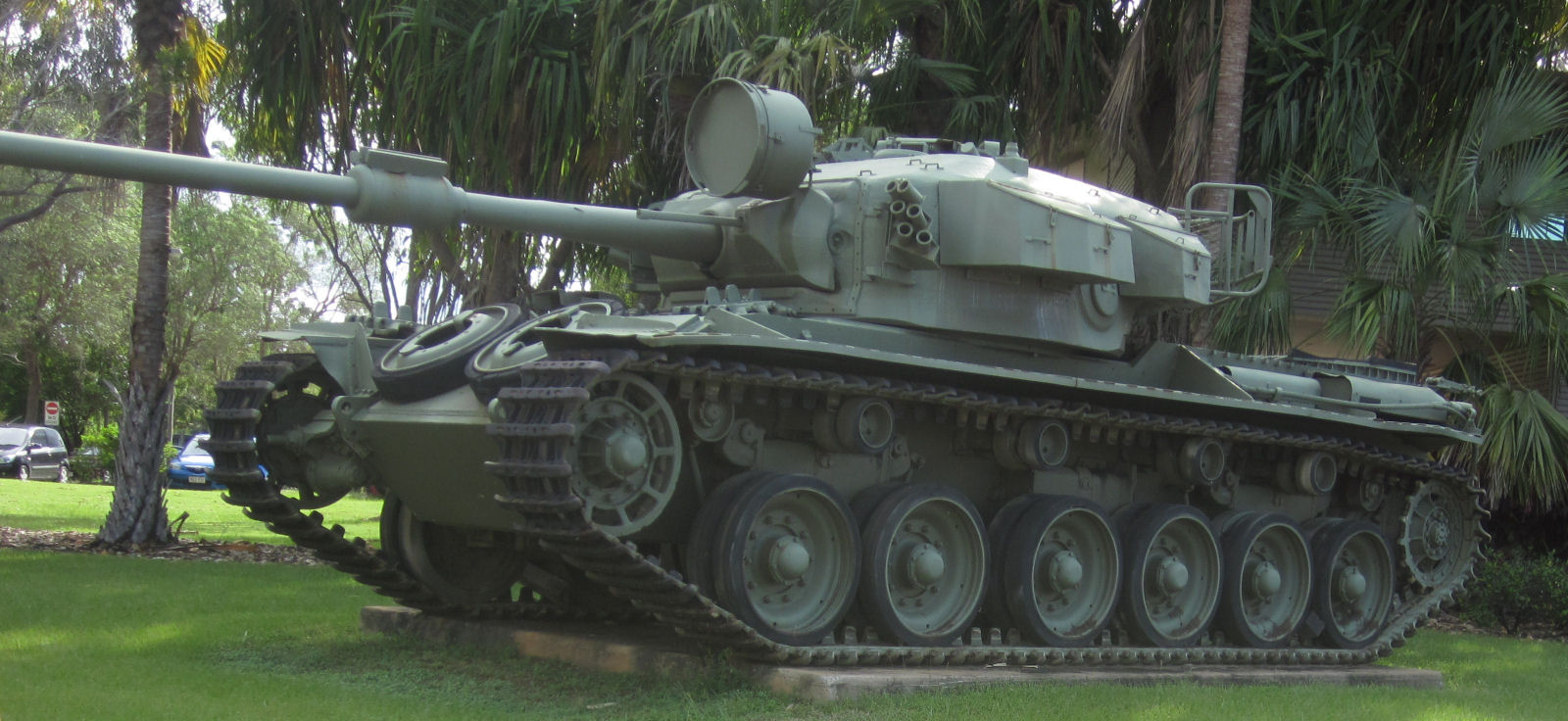
The Atomic Tank at Robertson Barracks

An Australian Army Mk 3 Centurion Type K, Army Registration Number 169041, was involved in a small nuclear test at Emu Field in Australia in 1953 as part of Operation Totem 1. Built as number 39/190 at the Royal Ordnance Factory, Barnbow in 1951 it was assigned the British Army number 06 BA 16 and supplied to the Australian Commonwealth Government under Contract 2843 in 1952.

It was placed less than 500 yards (460 m) from the 9.1 kt blast with its turret facing the epicentre, left with the engine running and a full ammunition load. Examination after detonation found that it had been pushed away from the blast point by about 5 feet (1.5 m), pushed slightly left and that its engine had stopped working, but only because it had run out of fuel. Antennae were missing, lights and periscopes were heavily sandblasted, the cloth mantlet cover was incinerated, and the armoured side plates had been blown off and carried up to 200 yards (180 m) from the tank. The tank was driven back to Woomera three days after the nuclear test while it was still radioactive. All four members of the crew who drove the tank died in subsequent decades.

169041, subsequently nicknamed The Atomic Tank, was used in the Vietnam War. In May 1969, during a firefight, 169041 (call sign 24C) was hit by a rocket-propelled grenade (RPG). The turret crew were all wounded by fragmentation as the RPG hollow charge jet entered the lower left side of the fighting compartment, travelled diagonally across the floor and lodged in the rear right corner. Trooper Carter was evacuated, while the others remained on duty and the tank remained battleworthy.

The Atomic Tank was located at Robertson Barracks in Palmerston, Northern Territory, before being moved to RAAF Base Edinburgh in South Australia. Although other tanks were subjected to nuclear tests, 169041 is the only one known to have withstood a blast and to have later fought in a war.

== Variants ==
=== UK variants ===
==== Centurion Pilot Vehicles ====
20 built late 1944-early 1945. Vehicle weight 42 tons.
P1 – P5
Armed with 17 pdr with 20 mm Polsten cannon and 7.92 BESA in ball mounting at turret rear.

P6 – P10
17 pdr with linkage to 20 mm Polsten and turret rear escape hatch

P11 – P15
17 pdr with linkage to 7.92 mm BESA and turret rear escape hatch

P16 – P20
Armed with 77mm HV and driver-operated hull machine gun

==== Prototypes ====
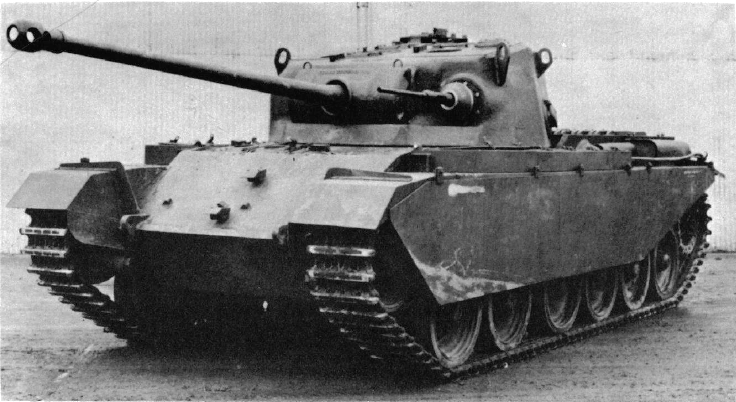
A41 prototype with Polsten cannon

A41 [20 mm]
Centurion prototype with secondary turret-mounted Polsten cannon
A41 [Besa]
Centurion prototype with coaxial Besa MG—later fitted with experimental CDL

==== Centurion production mark numbers ====
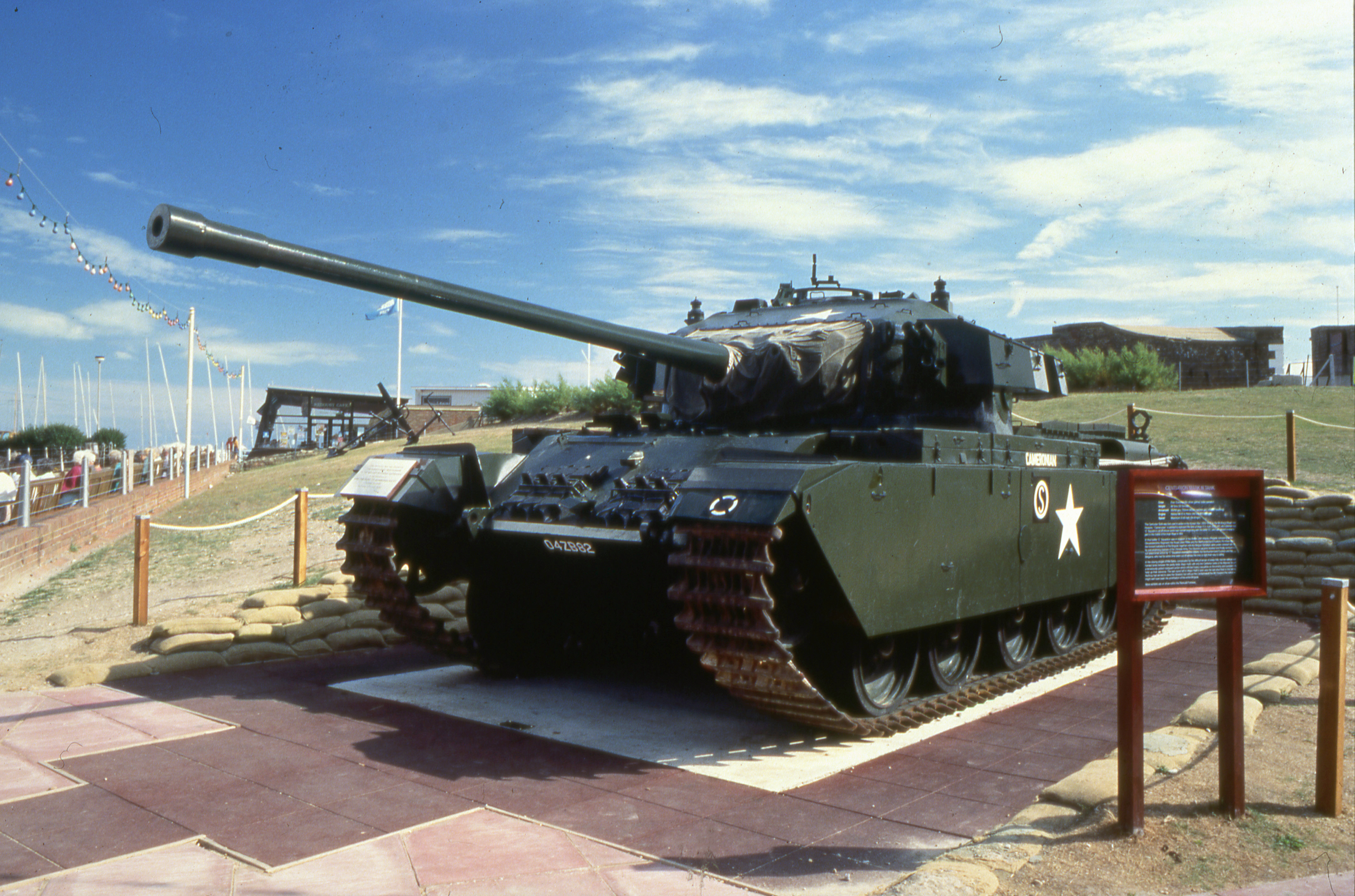
Centurion Mk 3 at Eastbourne Redoubt

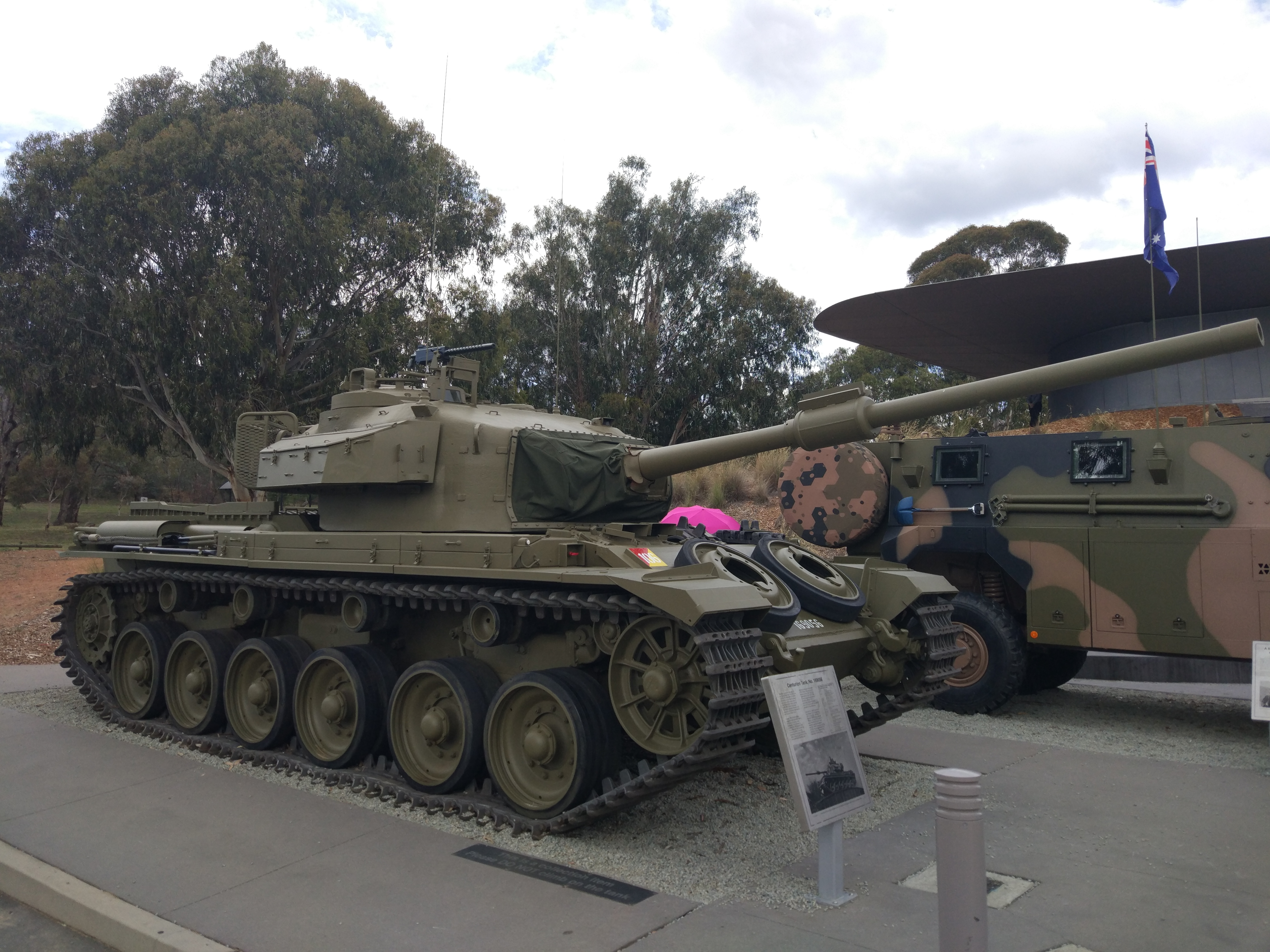
Centurion Mk 5/1 at the Australian War Memorial

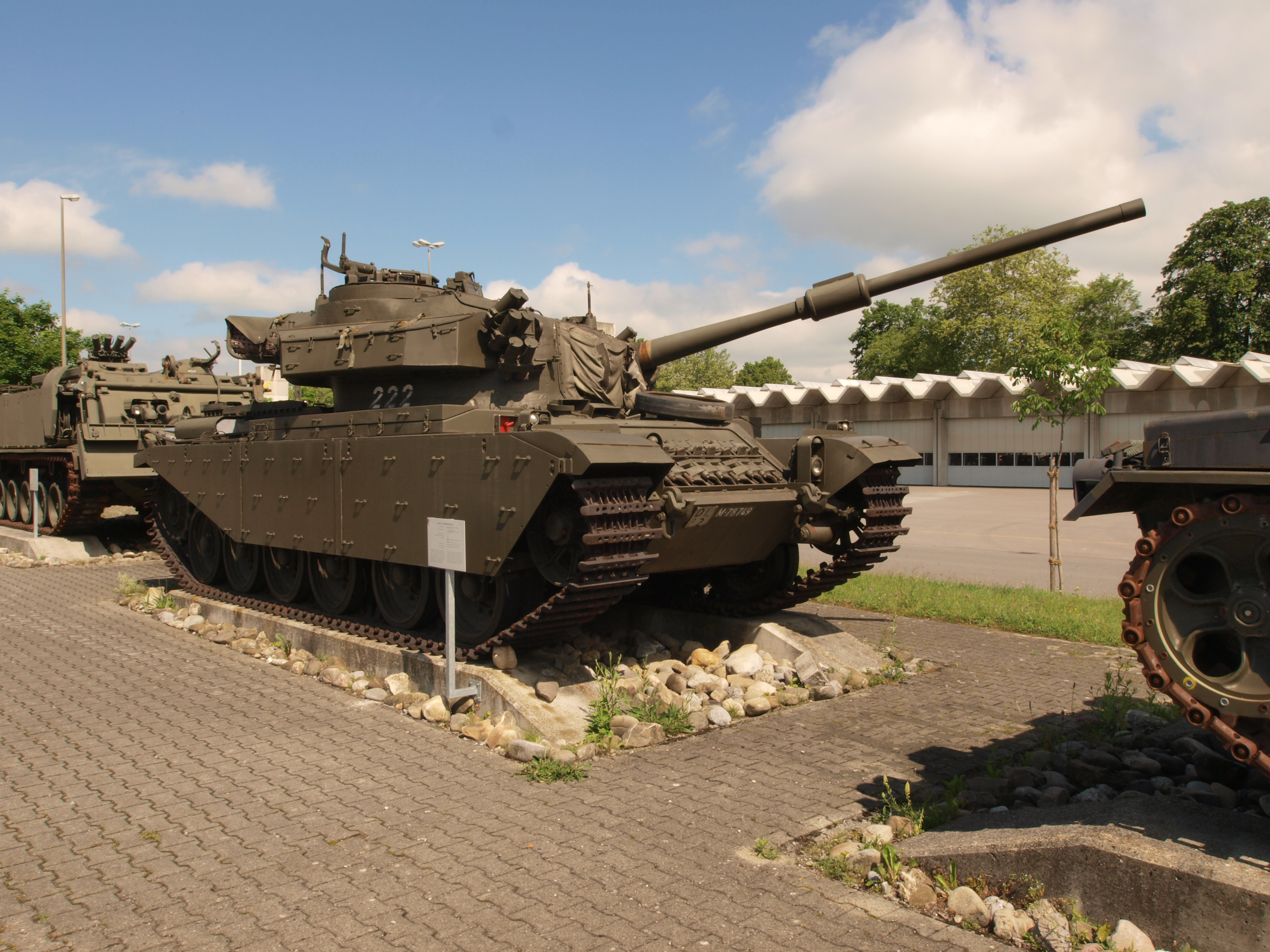
Centurion Mk 7

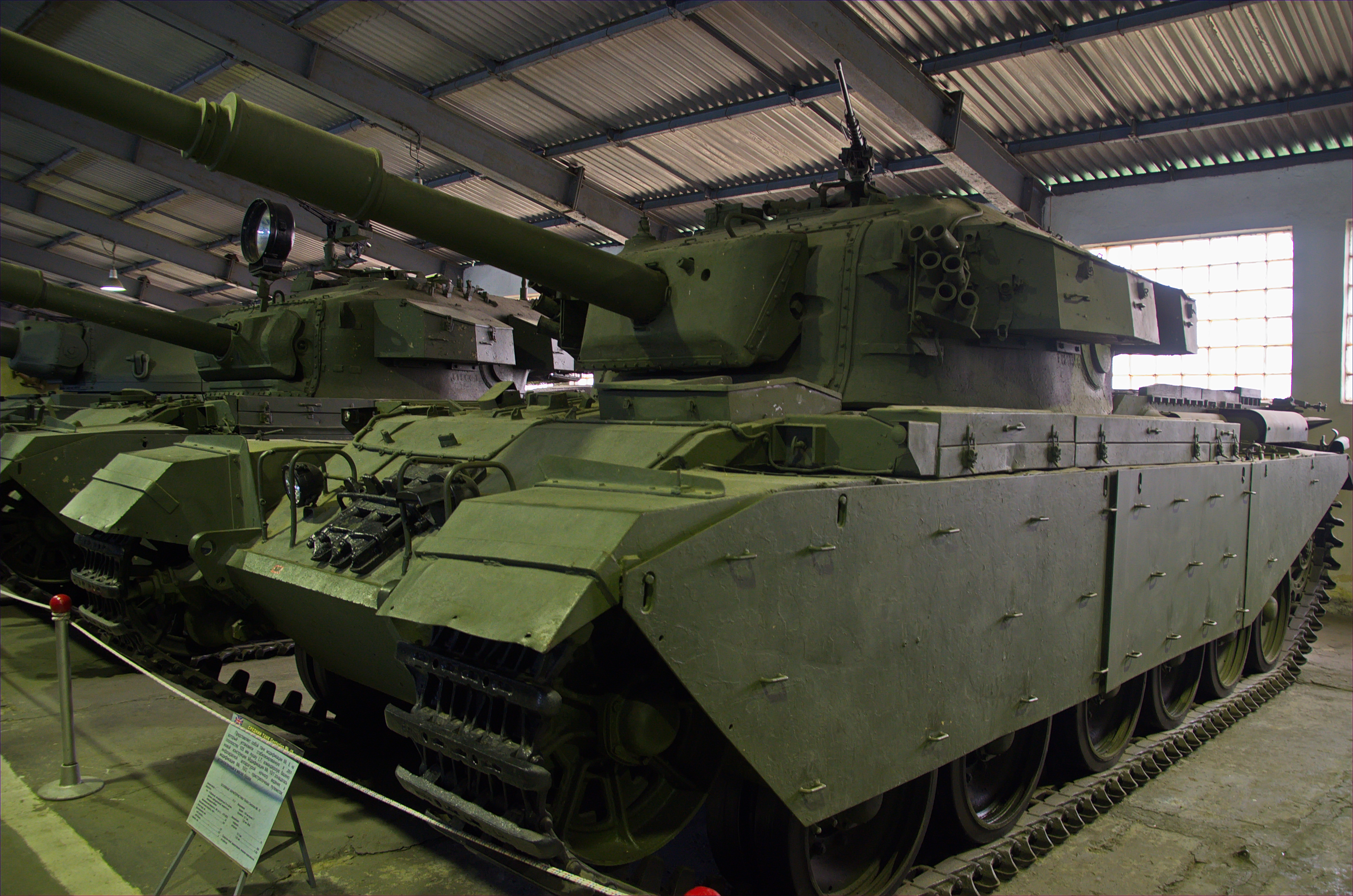
Centurion Mk 10

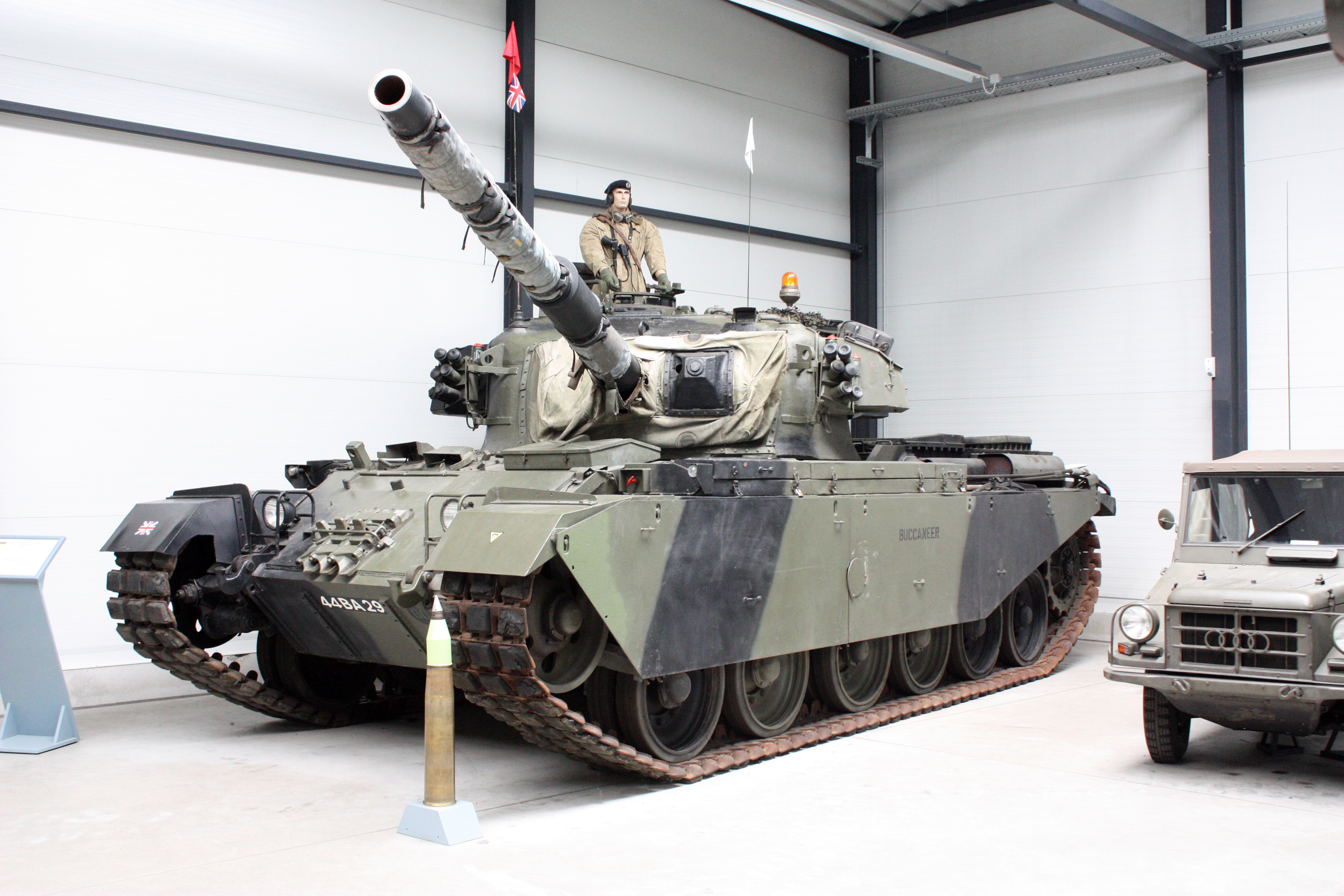
Centurion Mk 12

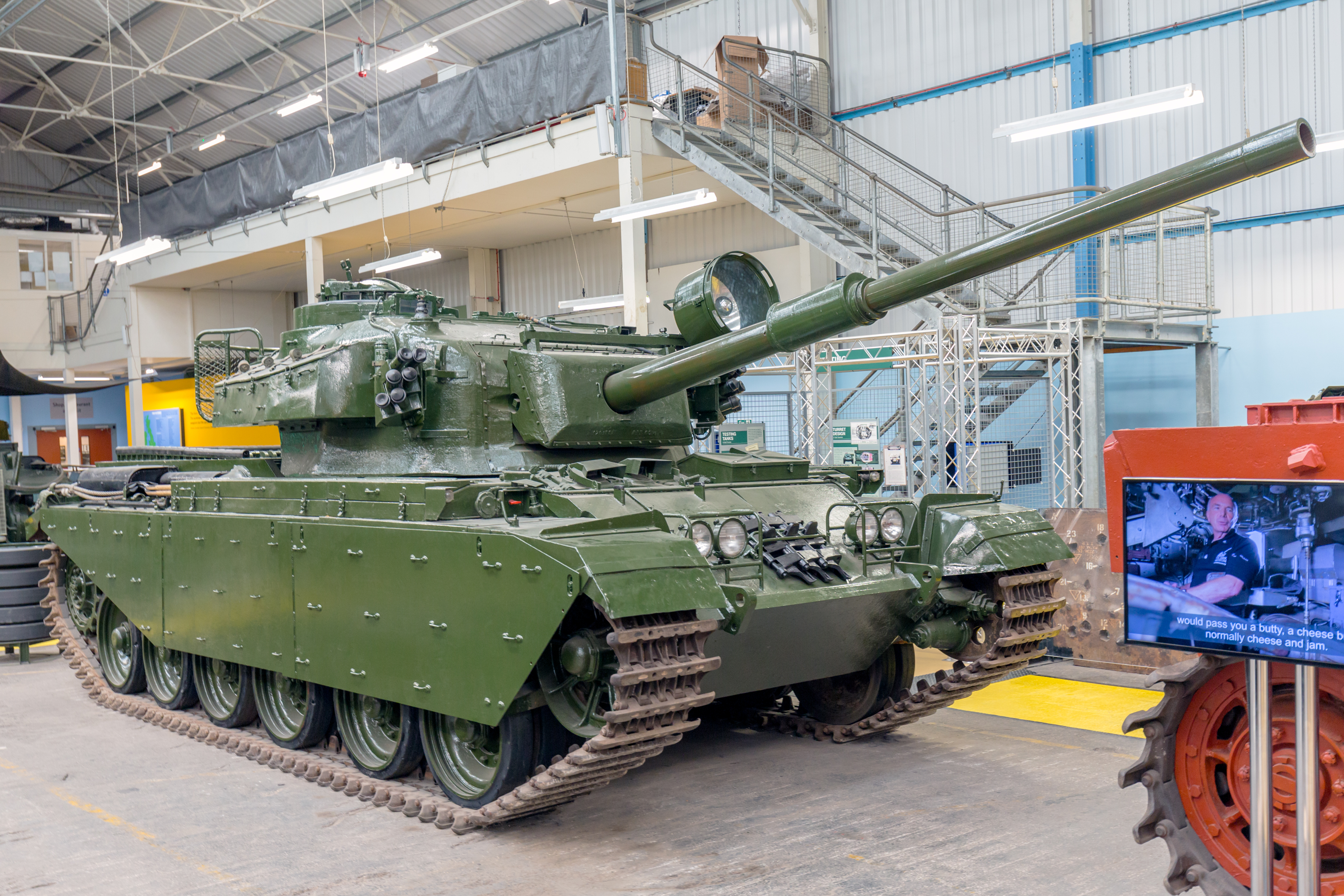
Centurion Mk 13

Centurion Mk 1
A41, armed with the 17pdr (76.2 mm) gun and Polsten cannon (or Besa machine gun). Fabricated turret with rear escape door, vehicle weight 47 tons. Six early vehicles sent to 5th Royal Inniskilling Dragoon Guards, 22nd Armoured Brigade at Gribbohm, in Germany, May 1945. (Note: Note: prototype vehicles and Centurion's Marks 1 to 3 were designed and produced under design leadership of the Associated Equipment Company (AEC).)
Centurion Mk 2
A41A, Up-armoured hull, fully cast turret, new commander's cupola, Polsten cannon and mount replaced with co-axial Besa machine gun, gunner's sighting periscope replacing sighting telescope, main gun armament stabilised in azimuth and elevation. Entered full production in 1946.
Centurion Mk 3
Upgunned to the 20pdr (84 mm) gun, slightly shorter hull, 2 stowage positions for track links on glacis, vehicle weight 49 tons. (Note: Note: most Mark 2s were later upgraded to Mark 3 standard in 1950-51) Fitted with a two-inch (51 mm) mortar, loaded and fired from within the turret. Entered full production in 1948, replaced earlier variants.
Centurion Mk 4
Projected close-support version with 95 mm CS howitzer, not built (Note: Note: it was initially planned for 10% of all Centurion production to be of Close Support (CS) vehicles. This requirement was later cancelled.)
Centurion Mk 5
Browning machine guns fitted to coaxial and commander's cupola mounts, turret rear escape door deleted, turret roof reshaped, deletion of 2" (51 mm) bomb thrower in turret roof, extra stowage bin on glacis, addition of guide roller in track run, (Note: Note: most of these modifications were retrospectively applied to Mark 3 vehicles) vehicle weight 51 tons. (Note: Note: Centurion's Marks 5 onwards were designed and produced under design leadership of Vickers-Armstrong Limited.) Entered production in 1955.
Centurion Mk 5/1 a.k.a. FV 4011
Increased glacis armour, two coax machineguns: one .30 (7.62 mm) Browning & one .50 (12.7 mm) caliber Browning for ranging the 84 mm (20-pounder) main gun
Centurion Mk 5/2
Upgunned to the Royal Ordnance L7 105 mm gun (Note: Note: Mark 5 vehicles after receiving up-gunning and up-armouring were later designated Mark 6)
Centurion Mk 6
Upgunned and uparmoured Mk 5
Centurion Mk 6/1
Mk 6 fitted with IR equipment
Centurion Mk 6/2
Mk 6/1 fitted with ranging gun
Centurion Mk 7 a.k.a. FV 4007
Revised engine decks, and added a third internal fuel tank. Armed with the 20pdr (84 mm) gun.
Centurion Mk 7/1 a.k.a. FV 4012
Uparmoured Mk 7
Centurion Mk 7/2
Upgunned Mk 7 (Note: Note: Mark 7 vehicles after receiving up-gunning and up-armouring were later designated Mark 9)
Centurion Mk 8
Resilient mantlet and new commanders cupola. Armed with the 20pdr (84 mm) gun.
Centurion Mk 8/1
Uparmoured Mk 8
Centurion Mk 8/2
Upgunned Mk 8 (Note: Note: Mark 8 vehicles after receiving up-gunning and up-armouring were later designated Mark 10)
Centurion Mk 9 a.k.a. FV 4015
A Mk 7 uparmored and upgunned to the L7 gun.
Centurion Mk 9/1
Mk 9 with IR equipment
Centurion Mk 9/2
Mk 9 with ranging gun fitted
Centurion Mk 10 a.k.a. FV 4017
Upgunned and uparmoured Mk 8
Centurion Mk 10/1
Mk 10 with IR equipment
Centurion Mk 10/2
Mk 10 with ranging gun fitted
Centurion Mk 11
Mk 6 fitted with IR equipment and ranging gun
Centurion Mk 12
Mk 9 fitted with IR equipment and ranging gun
Centurion Mk 13
Mk 10 fitted with IR equipment and .50 (12.7 mm) caliber Browning ranging gun.

==== Fighting Vehicle numbers ====
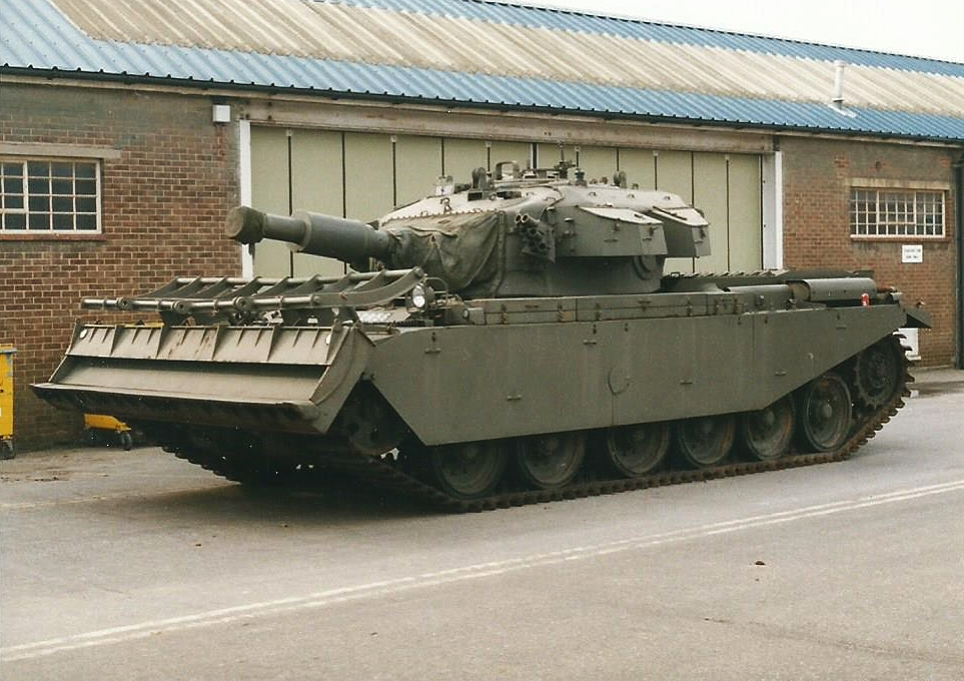
Centurion AVRE 165

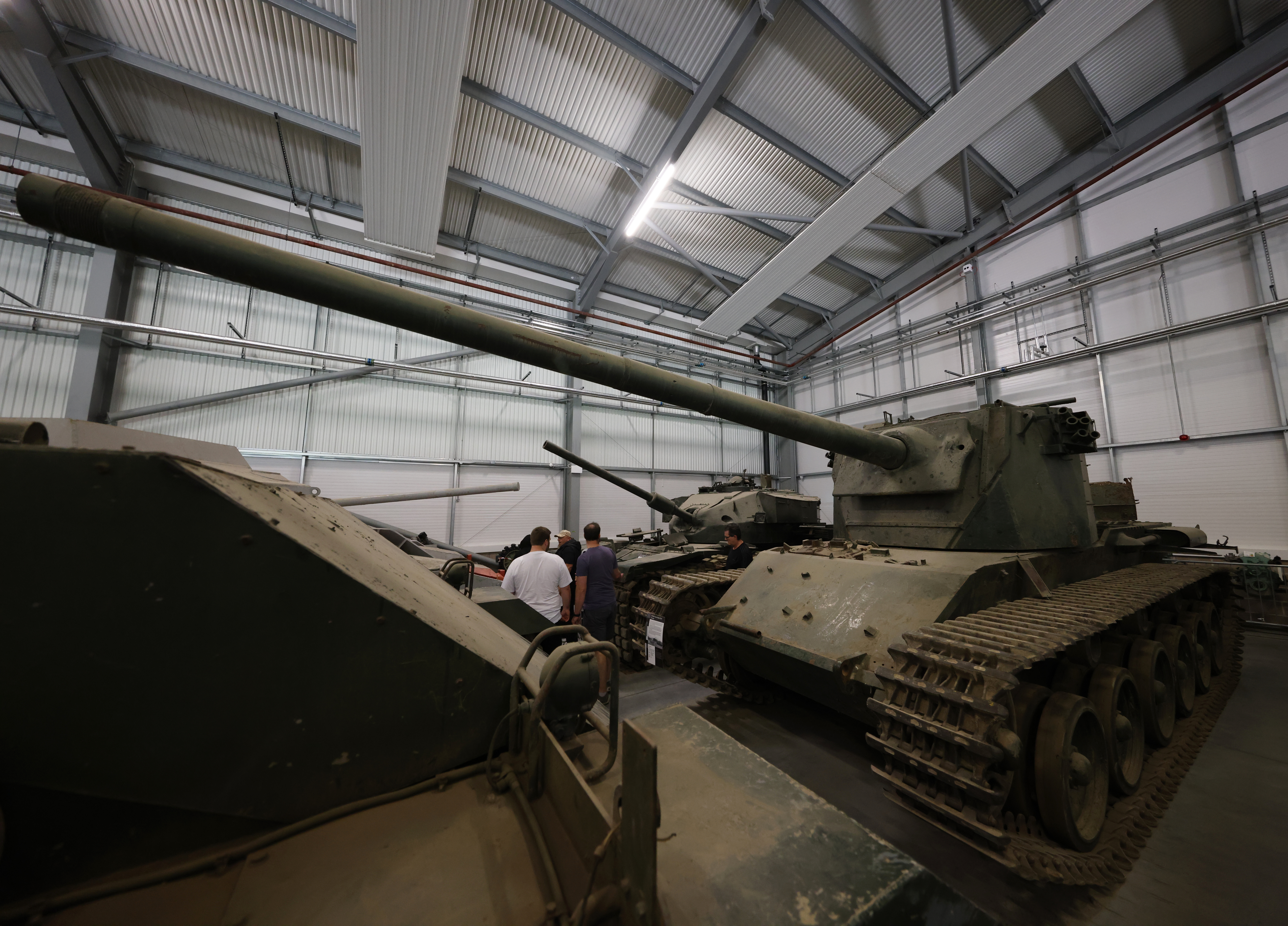
FV 4004 Conway in the right

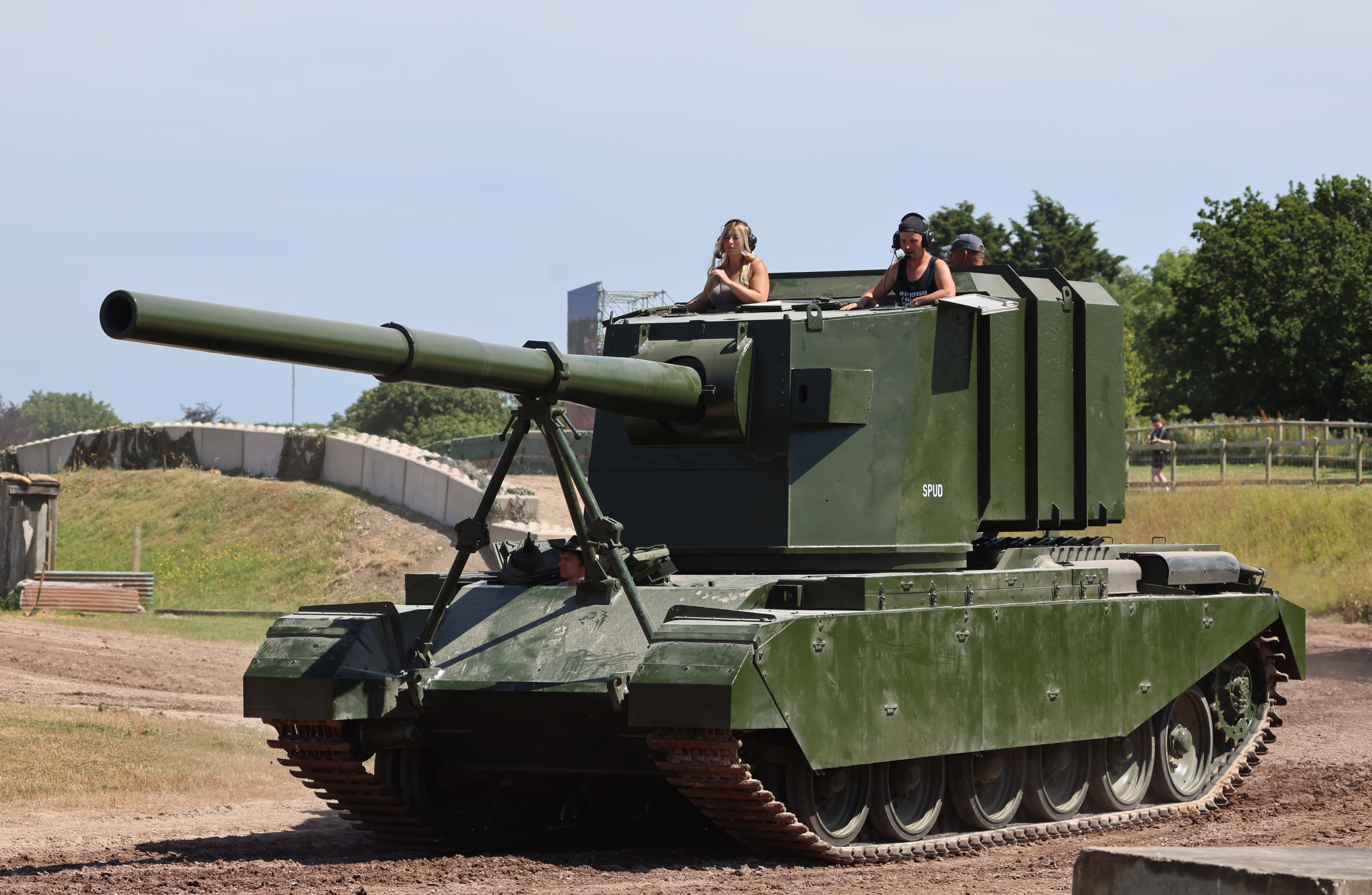
FV 4005 stage 2 in the Bovington Tank Museum

FV 3802
Self-propelled 25-pdr (88 mm) artillery prototype based on the Centurion—engine at the rear as in the gun tank, but only five road wheels per side. The gun was fitted in a barbette with 45° traverse to each side. Accepted in principle in 1954, but abandoned in favour of FV3805 in 1956.

FV 3805
Self-propelled 5.5 in (140 mm) artillery prototype, again based on the Centurion—engine at the front and driver over the trackguard. Project stopped in 1960 in favour of the FV433 105 mm SP Abbot. The single surviving prototype of the FV3805, which had its 5.5-inch (140 mm) gun removed, is known to be located on the Isle of Wight on the south coast of England. This prototype was converted into an artillery observation vehicle. As of August 2015, there is currently a crowd-sourced restoration project in process, with the intent to restore the vehicle to fully operational and running capacity.

FV 4002 Centurion Mk 5 Bridgelayer
(1963) – Mk 5 chassis with a No 5 Tank Bridge. The 52 by 13 ft (15.8 by 4.0 m) bridge could be launched in less than two minutes, could span a gap of 45 ft (14 m) and with a height difference of up to 8 ft (2.4 m) and could bear up to 80 tons.

FV 4003 Centurion Mk 5 AVRE 165
(1963) – AVRE (Armoured Vehicle Royal Engineers) vehicle with a 165 mm demolition gun with a range of about 2,000 yards (1,800 m) and firing a 60 lb (27 kg) HESH projectile for breaching obstacles. It was fitted with a hydraulically operated dozer blade or a mine plough and could carry a fascine bundle or a roll of metal Class 60 Trackway, tow the Viper mine-clearance equipment or a trailer. This variant had a five-man crew and was used in the 1972 Operation Motorman and in the 1991 Gulf War.

FV 4004 Conway
"FV 4004 Self-propelled gun, 120 mm, L1 gun, Mk 3" prototype based on a Centurion Mark 3 hull with a larger calibre 120 mm L1 gun in a turret designed by Auster and made by Chubb of rolled plate. Due to the long recoil of the gun, the gun had to mounted higher up to avoid striking the turret ring and had limited elevation and depression. It was intended to be an interim design until the Conqueror tank, which had the same gun, entered service. One was built before the project was cancelled in 1951.

FV 4005 Stage1/Stage 2
An experimental tank destroyer with a 183 mm gun L4, which was a modified version of the BL 7.2-inch (183 mm) howitzer. The project started in 1951/52, as an effort to quickly put the gun on a Centurion hull alongside the intended FV215 Heavy Tank project, and developed in July 1955. The Stage 1 used an open mount fixed gun with a loader assistant device for firing trials, this was then developed into the Stage 2 with a lightly armoured, fully enclosed and traversable turret but with the loading assist removed. By August 1957, the tank destroyer was dismantled. It was later reassembled, replacing the original Centurion Mk.3 Hull with Mk.12 Hull, and put on display in the Bovington Tank Museum. In November 2023 the turret was removed from the Mk.12 Hull before being placed on an Mk.3 hull and restored to running condition.

FV 4006 Centurion ARV Mk 2
(1956) – Mk 1 / Mk 2 / Mk 3 hull with the turret replaced by a superstructure housing a winch. The winch was powered by an auxiliary engine and was capable of pulling of up to 90 tons using a system of blocks. Armed with a single .30 in (7.62 mm) machine gun on the commander's cupola.
FV 4007 Centurion Mk 1, 2, 3, 4, 7, 8/1, 8/2
FV 4008 Duplex Drive Amphibious Landing Kit
12 lightweight panels forming a skirt around a permanently fixed deck; the panels were jettisoned with explosive charges.
FV 4010 a.k.a. Heavy Tank Destroyer G.W. Carrier
Malkara Anti Tank Guided Missile launcher vehicle
FV 4011 Centurion Mk 5
FV 4012 Centurion Mk 7/1, 7/2
FV 4013 Centurion ARV Mk 1
(1952) – Based on Mk 1 / Mk 2 hull. Turret replaced by a superstructure housing a winch driven by a 72 hp (54 kW) Bedford QL truck engine. About 180 units were built, some of them were used in the Korean War. After 1959, they were used solely as training vehicles.
FV 4015 Centurion Mk 9
FV 4016 Centurion ARK
(1963) – Armoured Ramp Carrier. Built on a Mark 5, the vehicle itself was part of the bridge. It could span a gap of up to 75 feet (23 m), and could bear up to 80 tons.
FV 4017 Centurion Mk 10
FV 4018 Centurion BARV (1963)
Beach Armoured Recovery Vehicle. The last Centurion variant to be used by the British Army. One vehicle was still in use by the Royal Marines until 2003. Replaced by the Hippo, which is based on a Leopard 1 chassis.
FV 4019 Centurion Mk 5 Bulldozer
(1961) – Centurion Mk V with a dozer blade identical to that of the Centurion AVRE. One such tank was usually given to every Centurion-equipped squadron.
FV 4202 "40 ton Centurion"
Used to demonstrate various concepts later used in the Chieftain. A Rolls-Royce Meteorite engine with five pairs of smaller wheels. It had a needle nose turret front carrying a 20-pounder gun, welded to the rear of a Centurion turret. The driver had a reclining seat but could not operate the vehicle in the reclined position.

=== Specialist variants ===
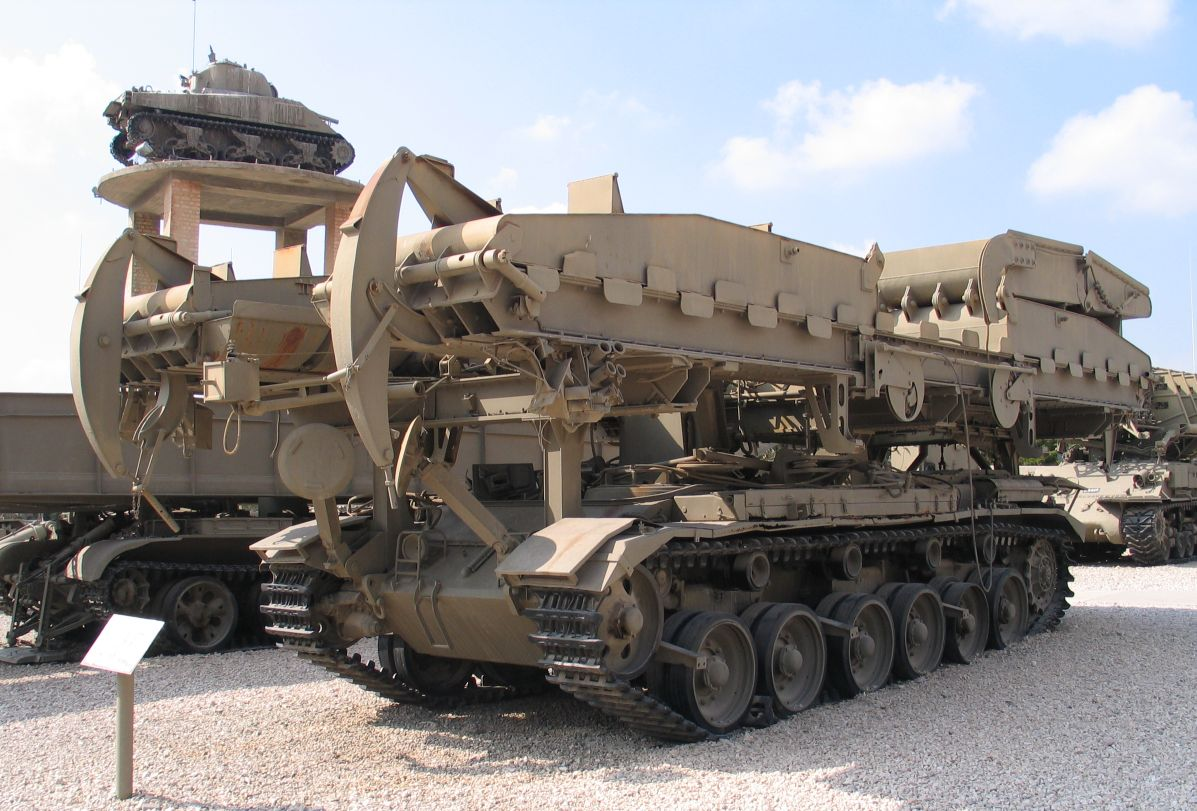
Centurion ARK

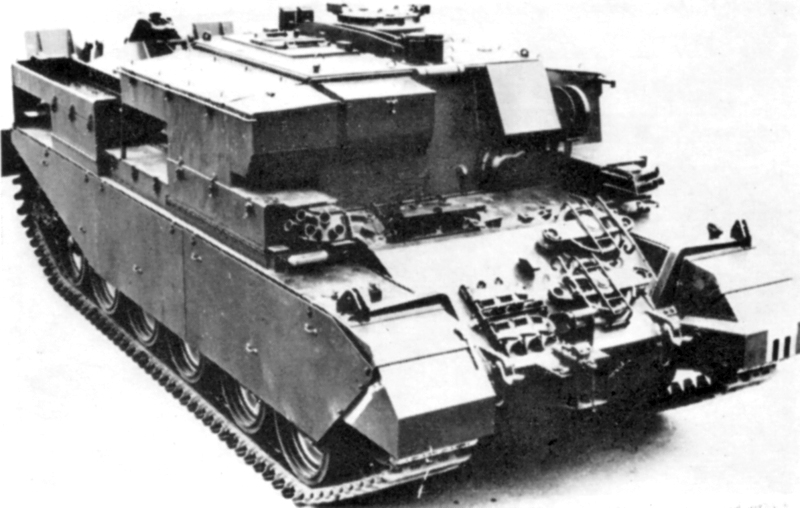
Centurion ARV Mk 2

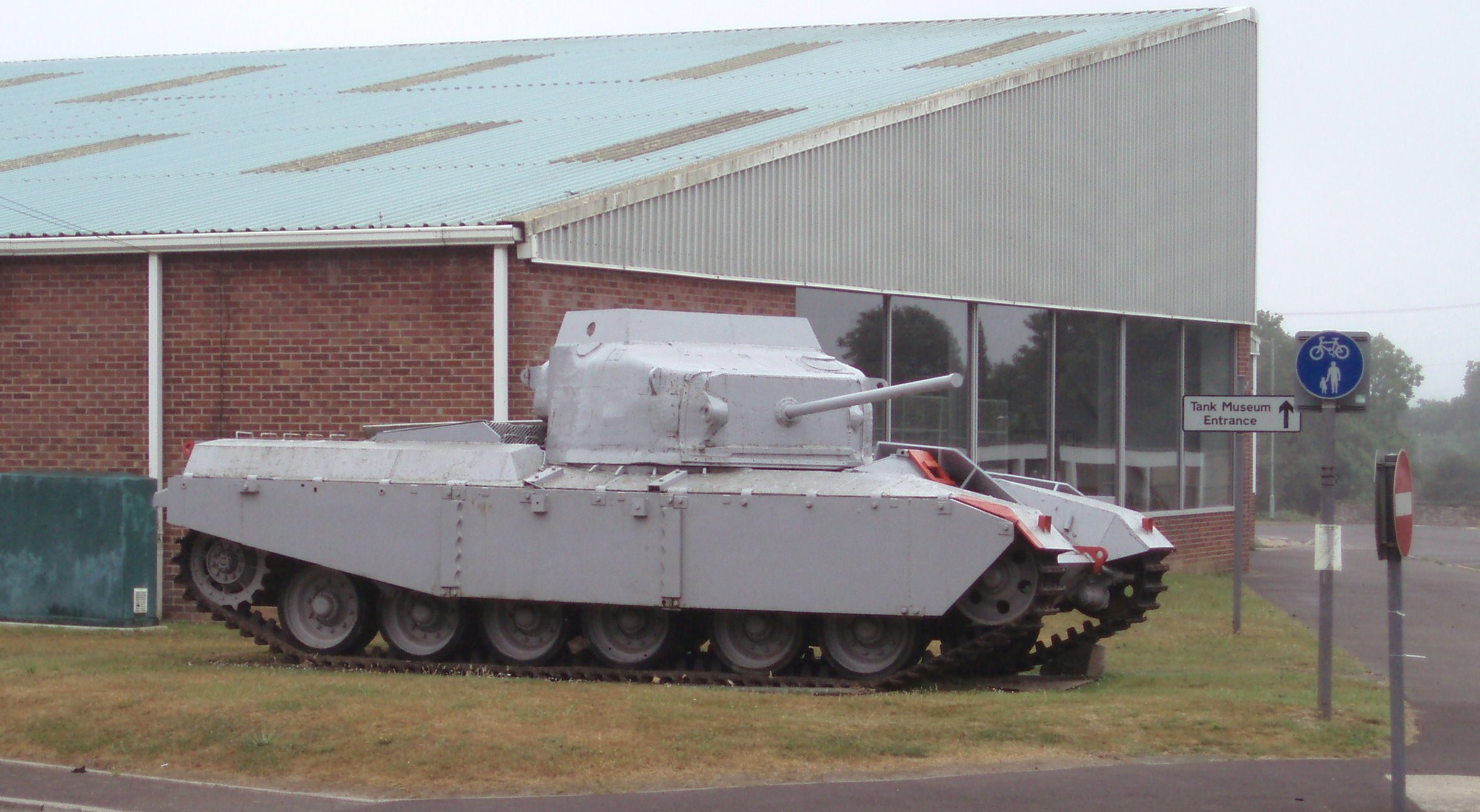
Centurion Target Tank

Centurion [Low Profile]
Variant with Teledyne Low-profile Turret. It was armed with a 105mm gun, and the hull was up-armoured to an unknown extent.
Centurion [MMWR Target]
Cobbled together radar target tank.
Centurion Marksman
Fitted with Marksman air defence turret
Centurion Ark (FV 4016)
Assault Gap Crossing Equipment (Armoured ramp carrier)
Centurion ARV Mk I
Armoured Recovery vehicle
Centurion ARV Mk II
Armoured Recovery Vehicle with superstructure
Centurion AVLB
Dutch armoured vehicle laying bridge
Centurion AVRE 105
Combat Engineer Version armed with 105 mm gun
Centurion AVRE 165
Combat Engineer Version armed with 165mm L9 Demolition Gun
Centurion BARV
Beach Armoured Recovery Vehicle
Centurion Bridgelayer (FV 4002)
Class 80 bridgelayer
Centurion Mk 12 AVRE 105
Ex-Forward Artillery Observer vehicles converted to AVRE role.
Centurion Target Tank
A Gun tank with most items removed from turret and dummy gun fitted, much thicker Bazooka plates fitted and extra armour in places. Used on Lulworth Ranges c1972-5 to train guided weapon missile crews using inert missiles. Nominally driver only.

=== Non-UK variants ===
==== Denmark ====
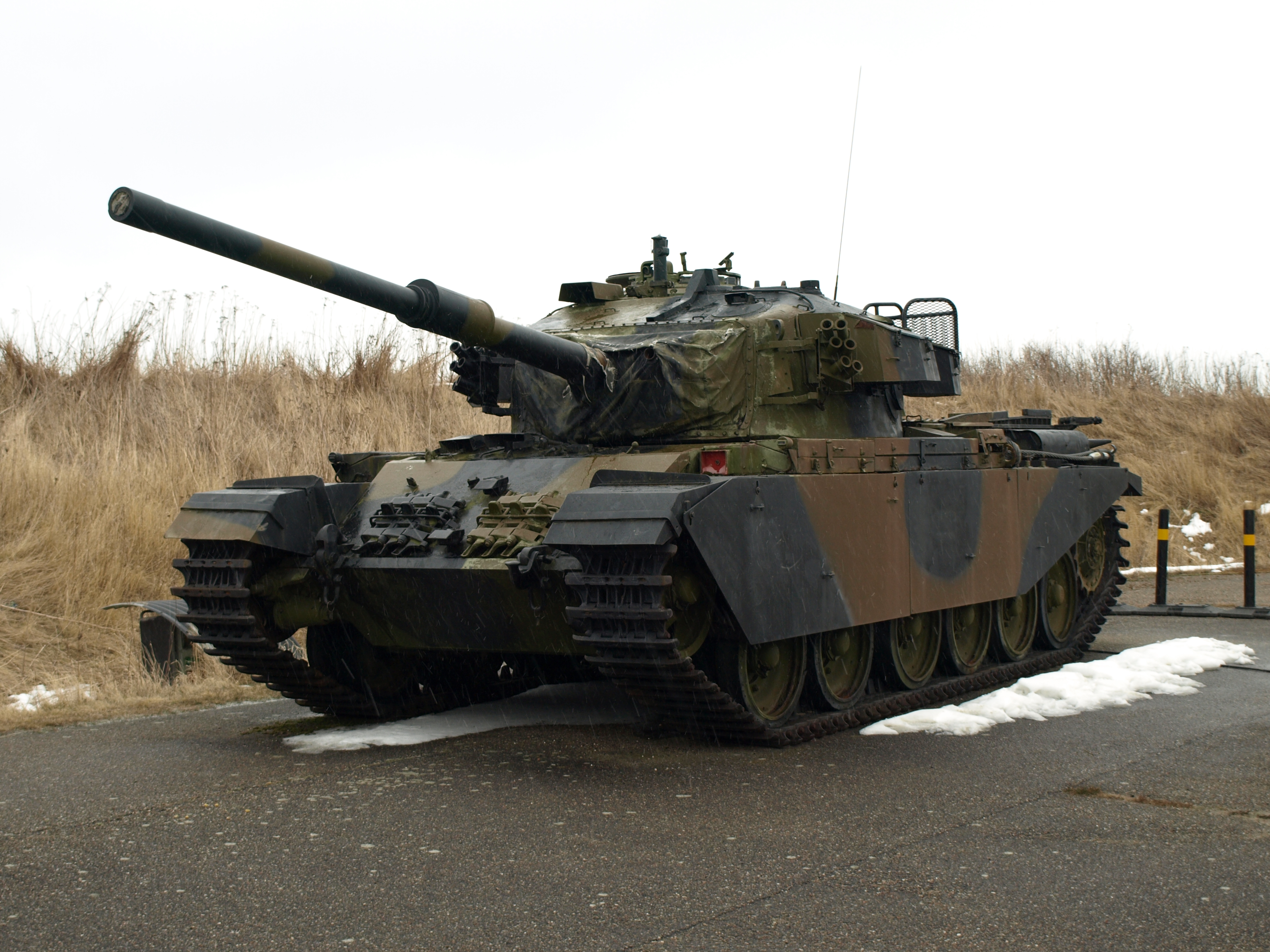
Centurion Mk V, 2 DK

Centurion Mk V, 2
A Mk V upgraded with the British 105 mm L7A1 gun and the Browning co-axial machine gun replaced by the German MG3. 106 Mk Vs were upgraded from 1964.

Centurion Mk V, 2 DK
Mk V, 2 with laser range finder and night vision optics. 90 units were upgraded in 1985.

==== Israel ====
All Israeli Centurion 105-mm-gunned "Sho't" variants are an upgrade and advancement of the previous variant, and were produced after one another. Sho'ts were converted to armoured personnel carriers after their service.

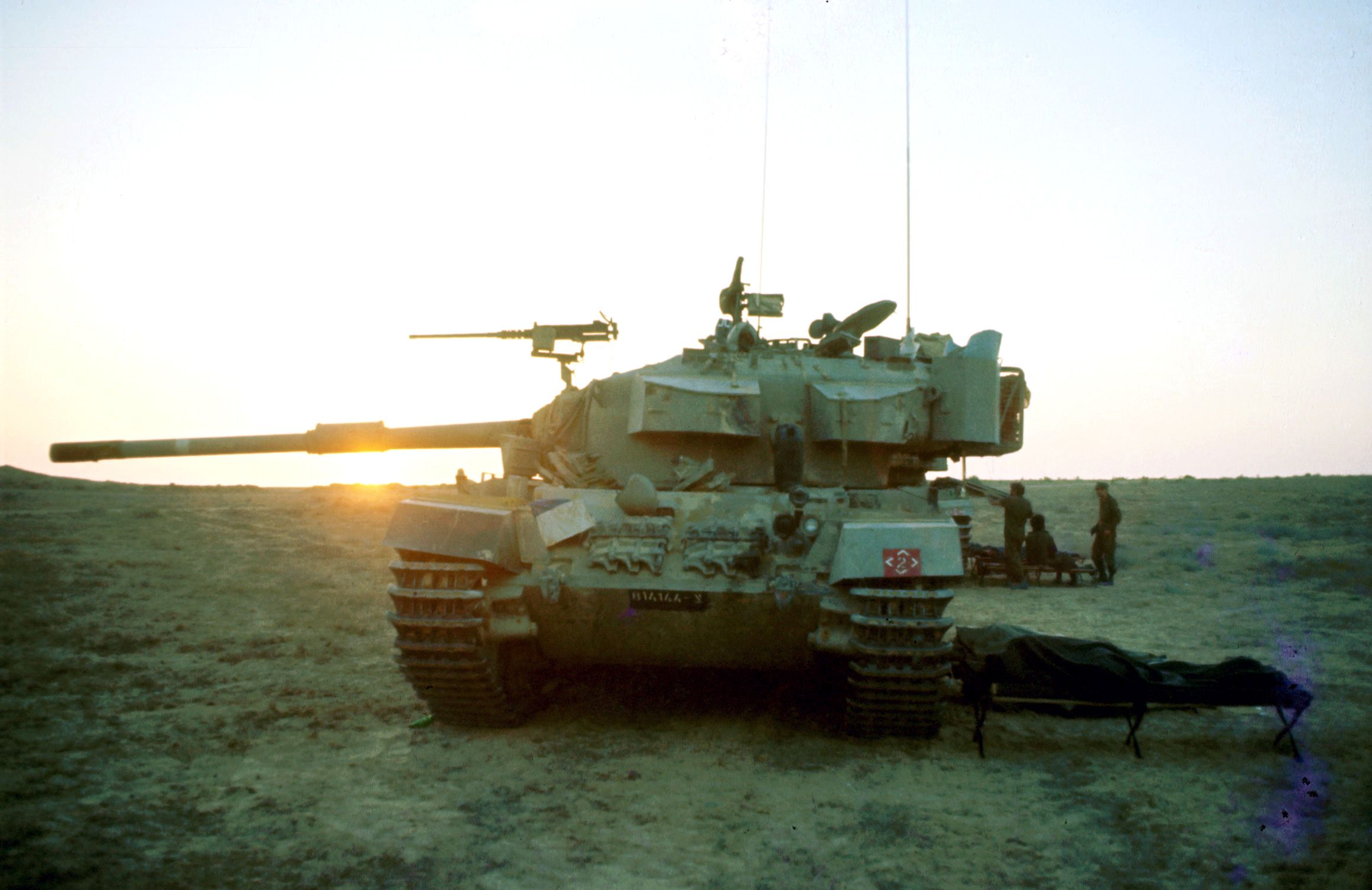
Sho't Kal Alef

Sho't (English – "Whip")
A standard Israeli designation of the Centurion with a 105 mm L7.
Sho't Meteor
Centurion Mark 3, 5, and 8 tanks with the original Meteor engine, with new additions of a 105 mm L7 cannon, exterior rear fuel tank, .50 caliber M2 machine gun attached to commander's cupola, and more minor modifications. Entered service in 1963.
Sho't Kal Alef
Modernised Centurion Mark 3, 5, and 8 tanks upgraded with a new Continental AVDS1790-2AC engine, new Allison CD-850-6A transmission, new fire control system, and more modernisation upgrades. Original British smoke launchers were removed. Entered service in 1970.

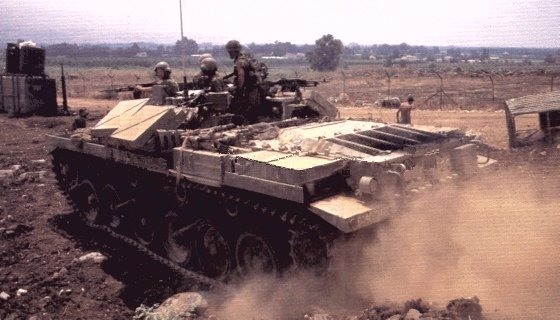
Nagmashot

Sho't Kal Bet
New hydraulic traverse system installed (Cadillac Gage), loader received a .30 caliber M1919 machine gun mounted closely to the loader's hatch, mounting points for explosive reactive armour added. Produced in 1975.
Sho't Kal Gimel
New installations of an upgraded engine (AVDS1790-2AG) featuring a new alternator, Blazer ERA, IS-10 smoke grenade launchers, new stabilisation system, and engine smoke generating system (ESS). Cadillac Gage turret traverse mechanism from the Bet was fully installed. Laser rangefinder and Nir David FCS installed. Manufactured in 1979.

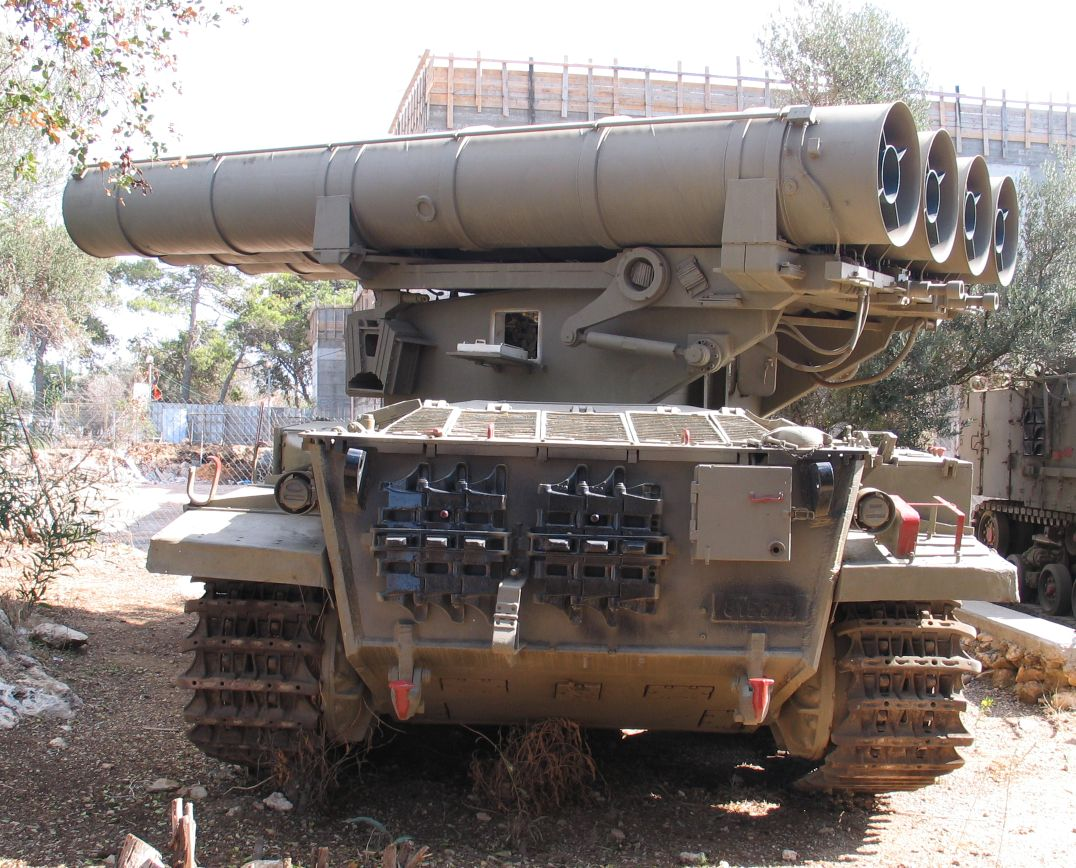
MAR-290 / Eshel ha-Yarden.

Sho't Kal Dalet
New thermal sleeve for the L7 cannon, all .30 caliber M1919 machine guns were replaced with FN MAG 60-40's, a new FCS was installed. Production began in 1984.
Nagmashot / Nagmachon / Nakpadon
Israeli heavy armoured personnel carriers based on the Centurion tank's chassis.
Puma
Israeli combat engineering vehicle on Centurion tank chassis.
Eshel ha-Yarden
A quadruple tubular launcher for 290 mm ground-to-ground rockets mounted on Centurion tank chassis. The project was cancelled after a single prototype was built. Both this vehicle and an earlier version based on Sherman chassis are often referred to as MAR-290.

==== Singapore ====
Tempest
Operated by Singapore, modernised with Israeli assistance, similar to Israeli variant, with diesel engine and new main gun, and possibly reactive armour. Tank is highly classified within the Singapore Army, resulting in an extremely scarce amount of information.

==== Netherlands ====
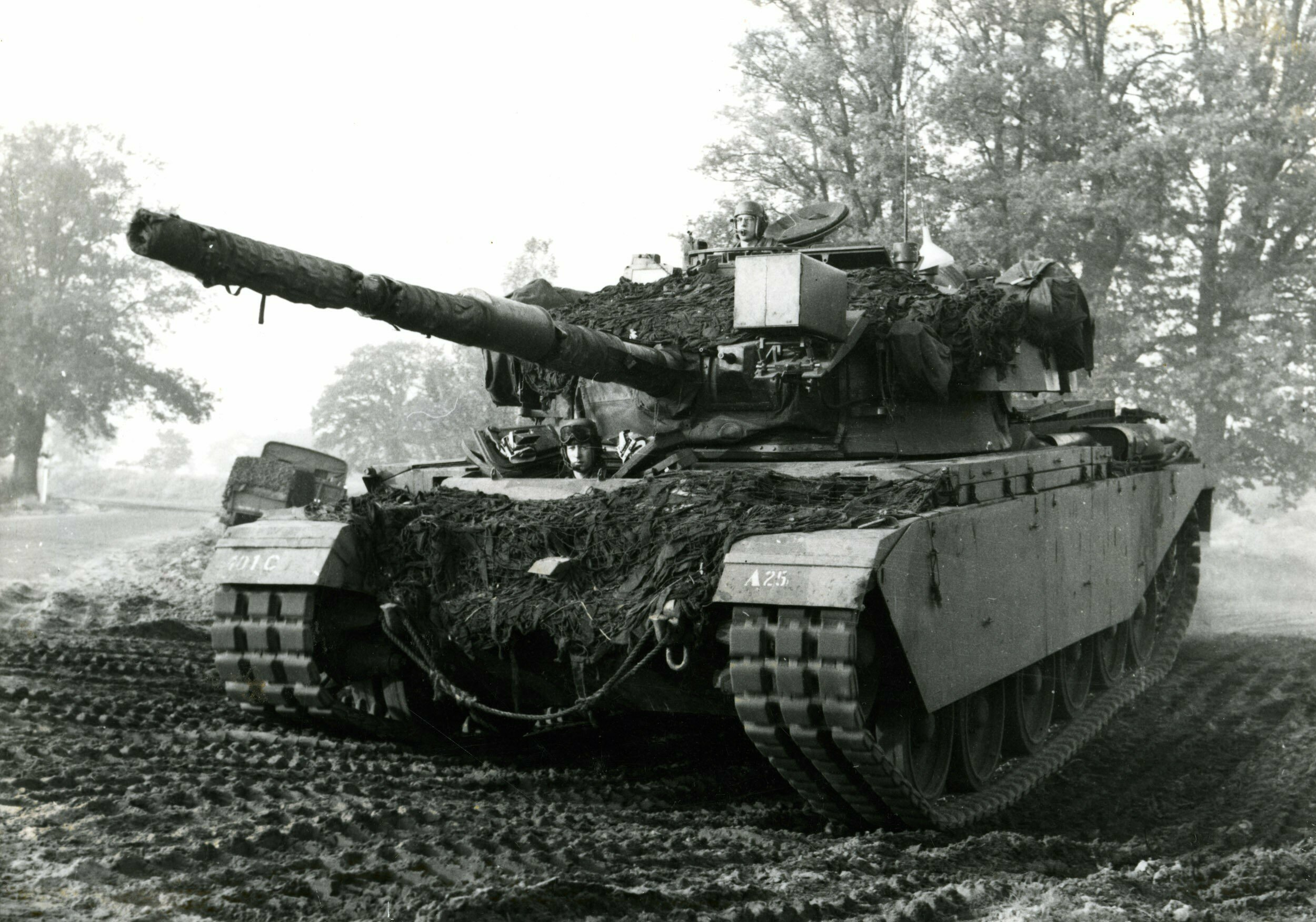
Dutch Centurion Mk 5/2 in 1969. The tank is distinguished by the rectangular housing of the xenon searchlight and is armed with the 105 mm L7 cannon.

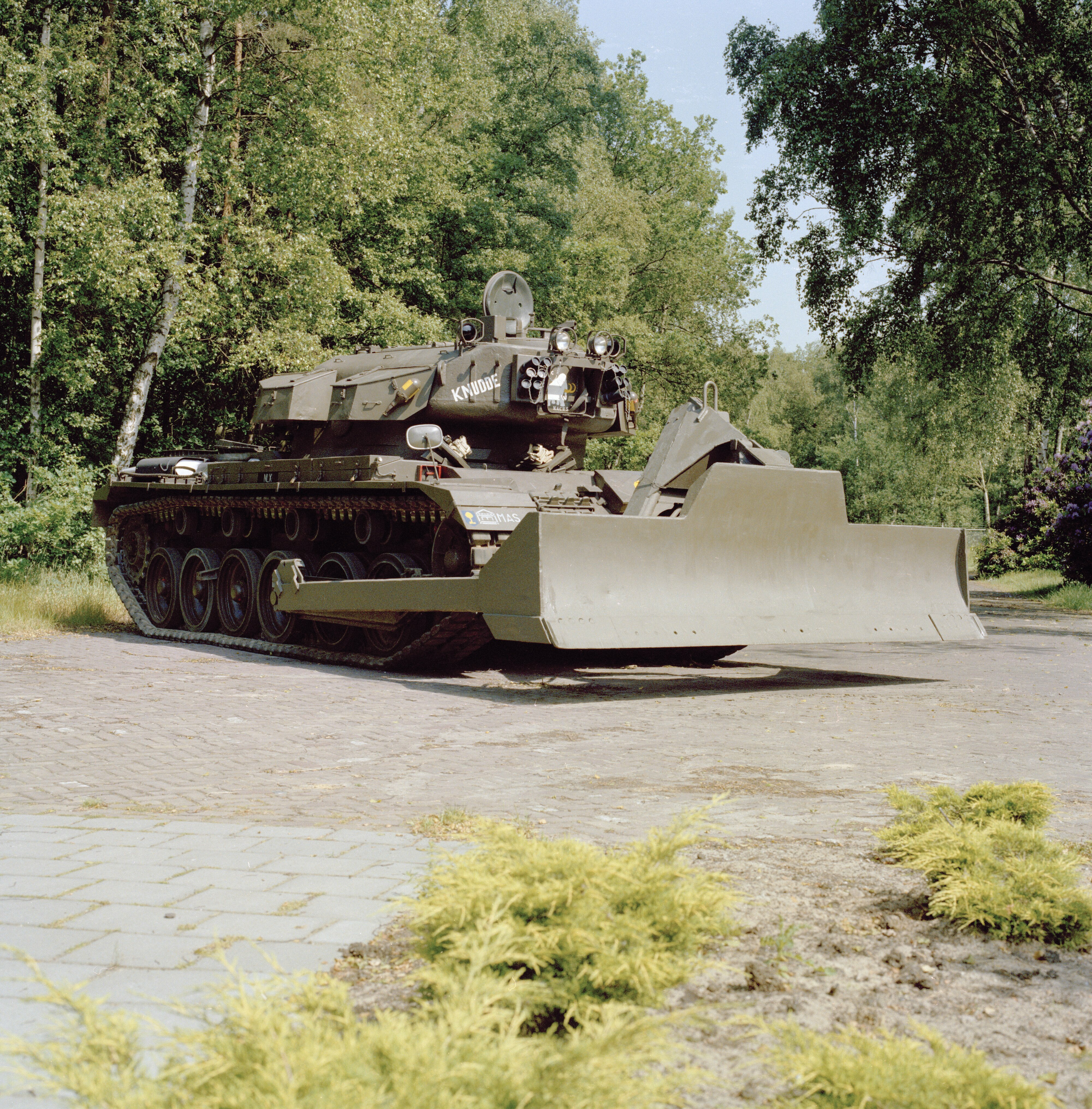
Centurion dozertank

Centurion Mk 5 NL and Mk 5/2 NL
Circa 1965, Dutch Mk 5 and 5/2 tanks were equipped with infrared headlights, searchlight, and viewing equipment, of Philips design instead of the types used on British tanks. Around the same time, a .50-caliber ranging machine gun was added, as was a spare wheel bracket on the rear of the turret, and from 1969, the M1919 Browning machine guns were replaced by FN MAGs. From 1973, the tanks' radio sets were replaced by Philips-designed ones.
Centurion bruggenlegger
Between 1962 and 1965, 17 Mk 5 gun tanks were converted to bridge layers (Dutch: bruggenlegger), using the same bridge and mechanism as the American M48 and M60 AVLBs.
Centurion dozertank
Also in 1962–65, 17 Mk 5s with 20-pounder guns were converted to dozer tanks by fitting adapted blades from old M4 Sherman dozers. Once ammunition stocks for the 20-pounders were exhausted, the guns were removed and the turrets fixed facing to the rear, with the smoke grenade launchers relocated to the now front of the turret with spotlights installed there as well to assist dozer operations at night.

==== South Africa ====
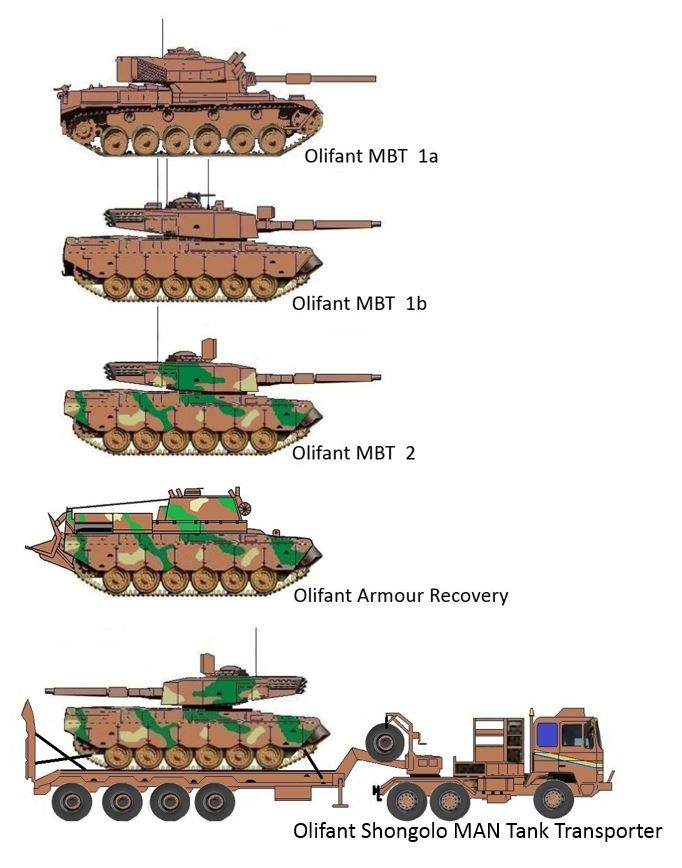
Olifant and its variants

Olifant
Centurion tanks redesigned and rebuilt by South Africa with the help of Israel; considered the best indigenous tank design on the African continent. The name 'Olifant derives from the Afrikaans word for 'elephant' - being a heavy animal and indicating the heaviest combat vehicle in the South African Army.

Semel

(1974) 810 hp fuel-injected petrol engine, three-speed semi-automatic transmission.

Olifant Mk 1

(1978) 750 hp diesel engine, semi-automatic transmission.

Olifant Mk 1A

(1985) Retains the fire control system of the original Centurion but has a hand-held laser rangefinder for the commander and image-intensifier for the gunner, while gaining a 105mm GT-3 Cannon.

Olifant Mk 1B

(1991) Torsion bar suspension, lengthened hull, additional armour on the glacis plate and turret, V-12 950 hp diesel engine, computerised fire control system, laser rangefinder and a new GT-3B 105mm Cannon.

Olifant Mk 2

Redesigned turret, new fire control system. Can mount an LIW 105 mm GT-8 rifled gun or a 120 mm GT-9 smooth bore gun.

==== Sweden ====
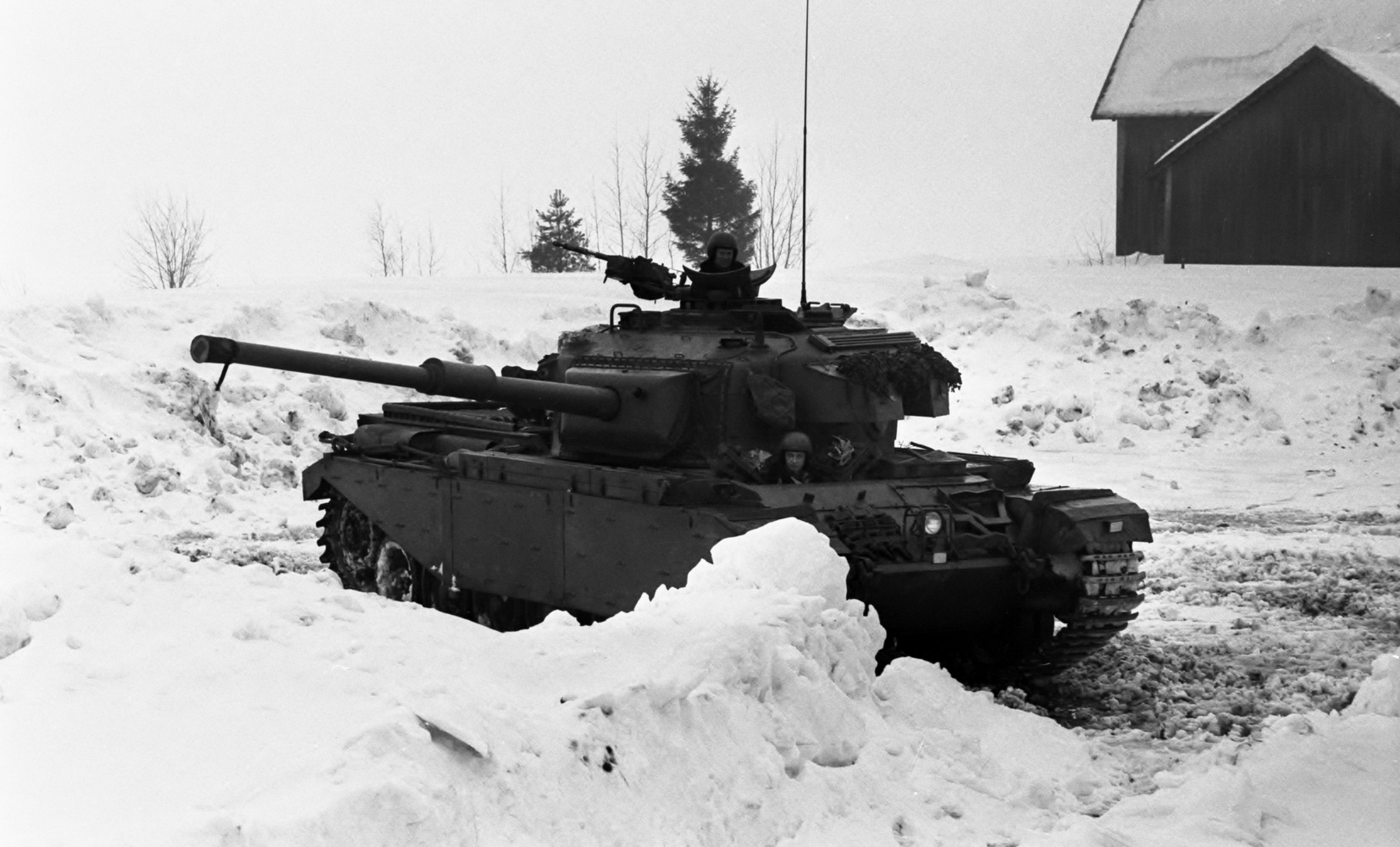
Strv 101 during exercise at Villingsberg in 1966

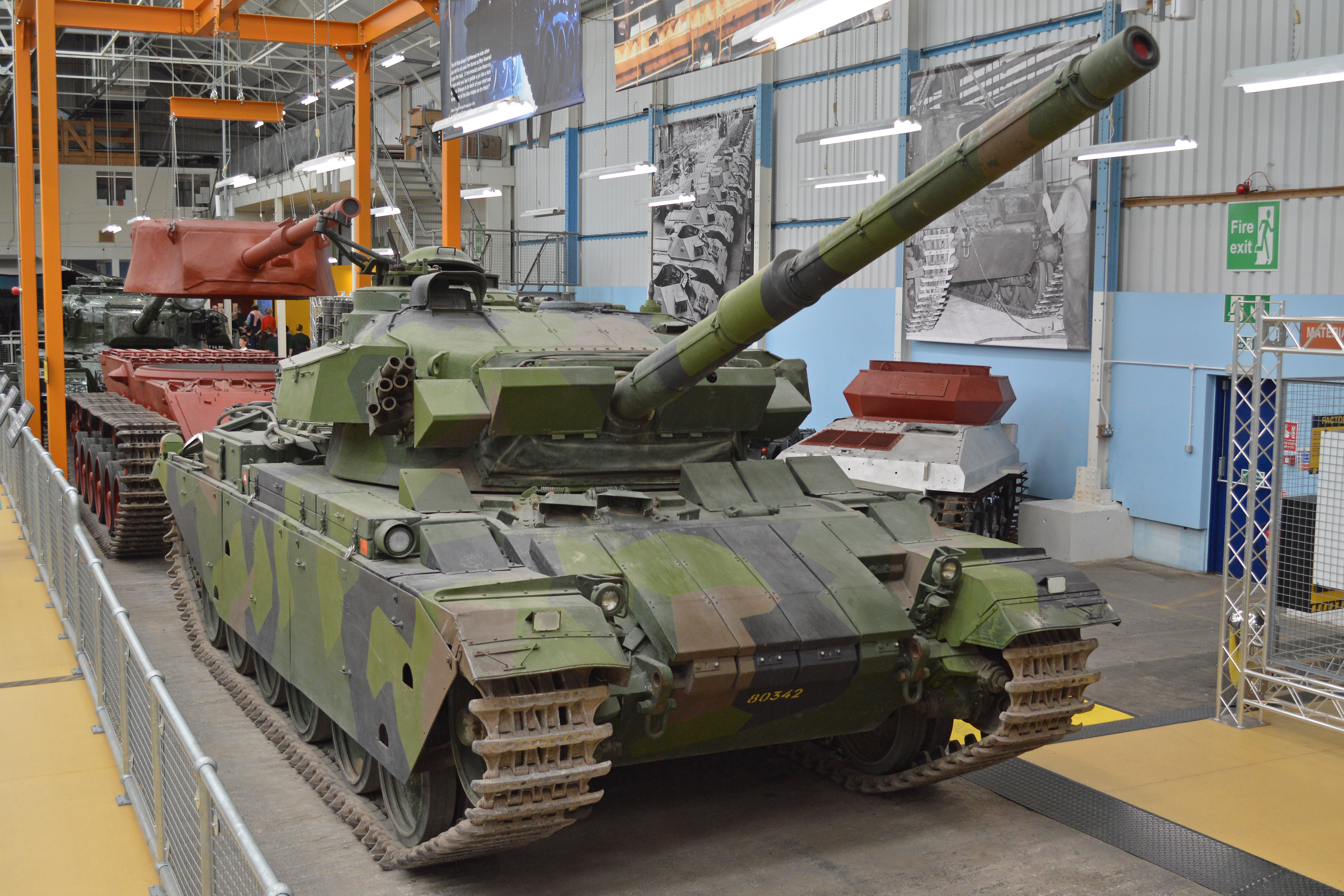
Strv 104 at The Tank Museum, Bovington

The designations follows the pattern of main gun calibre in centimetres followed by the service order number. Hence the Strv 81 is read as the first tank with an 8 cm gun, while the Strv 101 is the first tank with a 10 cm gun that was accepted into service.

Stridsvagn 81
Swedish Army designation for both the initial 80 Mk 3 Centurions (20 pdr gun) and the 1955 purchase of 160 Mk 5 Centurions, all with Imperial instrumentation, Swedish radios, etc. Pre-NATO threading made the screws incompatible with the later Strv 101.
Stridsvagn 101
Swedish Army designation for its 110 Mk 10 Centurions (105 mm gun) bought in 1958 with Swedish instrumentation and radios, etc.
Stridsvagn 102
Swedish Army designation for Stridsvagn 81 upgunned in 1964–1966 to 105 mm main gun.
Stridsvagn 101R
Swedish Army designation for Stridsvagn 101 upgraded in the 1980s with Renovation/modification (REMO).
Stridsvagn 102R
Swedish Army designation for Stridsvagn 102 upgraded in the 1980s with REMO and frontal armour matching the 101R.
Stridsvagn 104
Swedish Army designation for the 80 Stridsvagn 102 which in addition to the REMO received the same powerpack as the Sho't Kal Alef, consisting of a Continental diesel and an automatic gearbox from Allison.
Stridsvagn 105
Swedish Army designation for Stridsvagn 102R upgraded with new suspension, firecontrol systems etc. Prototype only.
Stridsvagn 106
Swedish Army designation for Stridsvagn 101R upgraded with new suspension, etc. Not built.
Bärgningsbandvagn 81
Swedish Army designation for Centurion ARV.

==== Switzerland ====
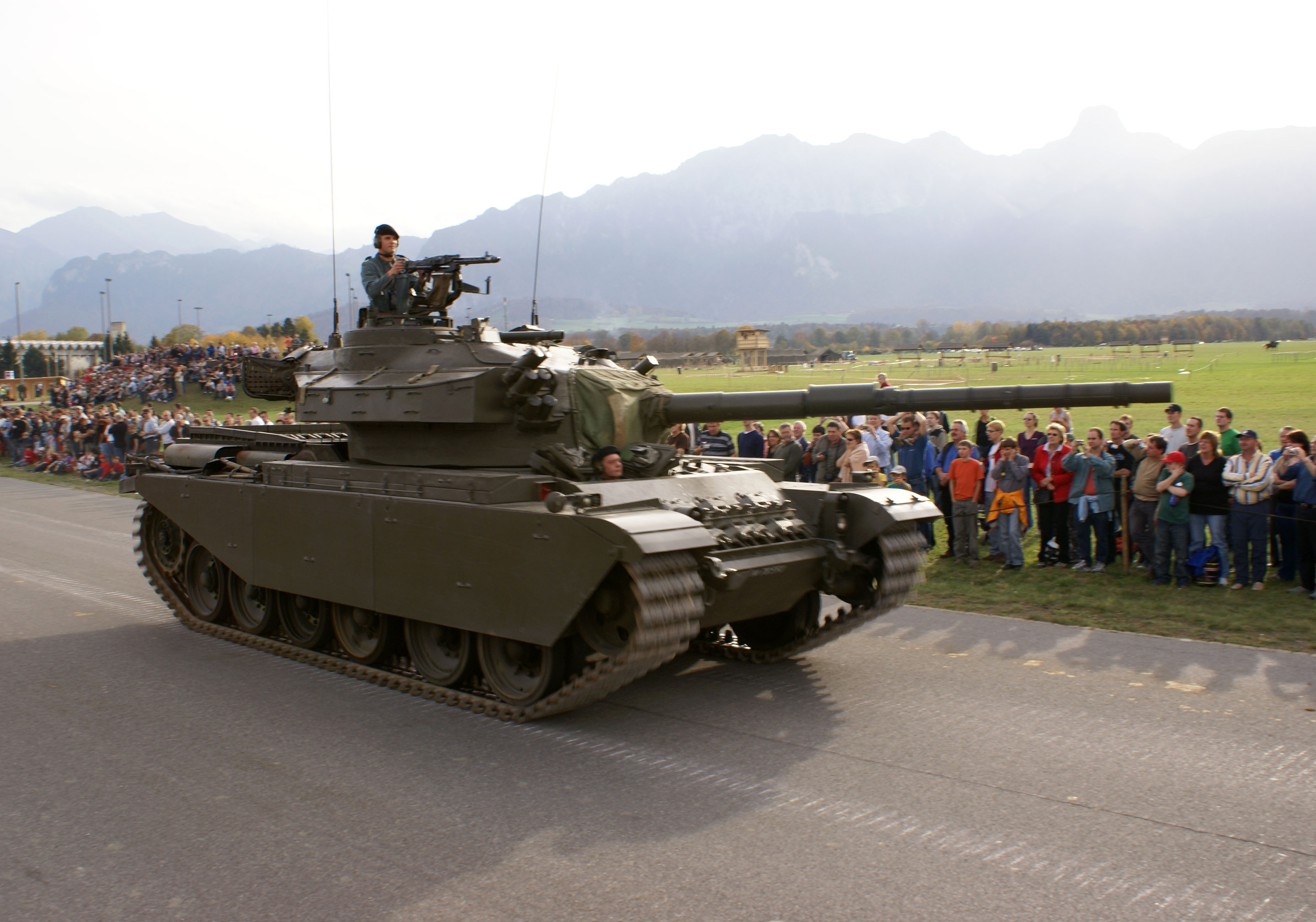
Panzer 55 with 105 mm L7

All Swiss Centurion Tanks were used with a retrofitted Swiss MG 51 / 71 as secondary armament.

Panzer 55
100 Centurion Mark 3's ordered in 1955 and delivered between 1956 and 1957.
100 additional Centurion Mark 5's were ordered from South Africa in 1960 and delivered between 1962 and 1964
150 of the vehicles were subsequently re-armed with the 105 mm L7.
Panzer 57
100 Centurion Mark 7's ordered in 1957 and delivered between 1958 and 1960
12 used (Canadian) Centurion Mark 12's were ordered in 1975/76 and delivered in 1976/77

==== Jordan ====
Tariq
Jordan designation.

== Operators ==
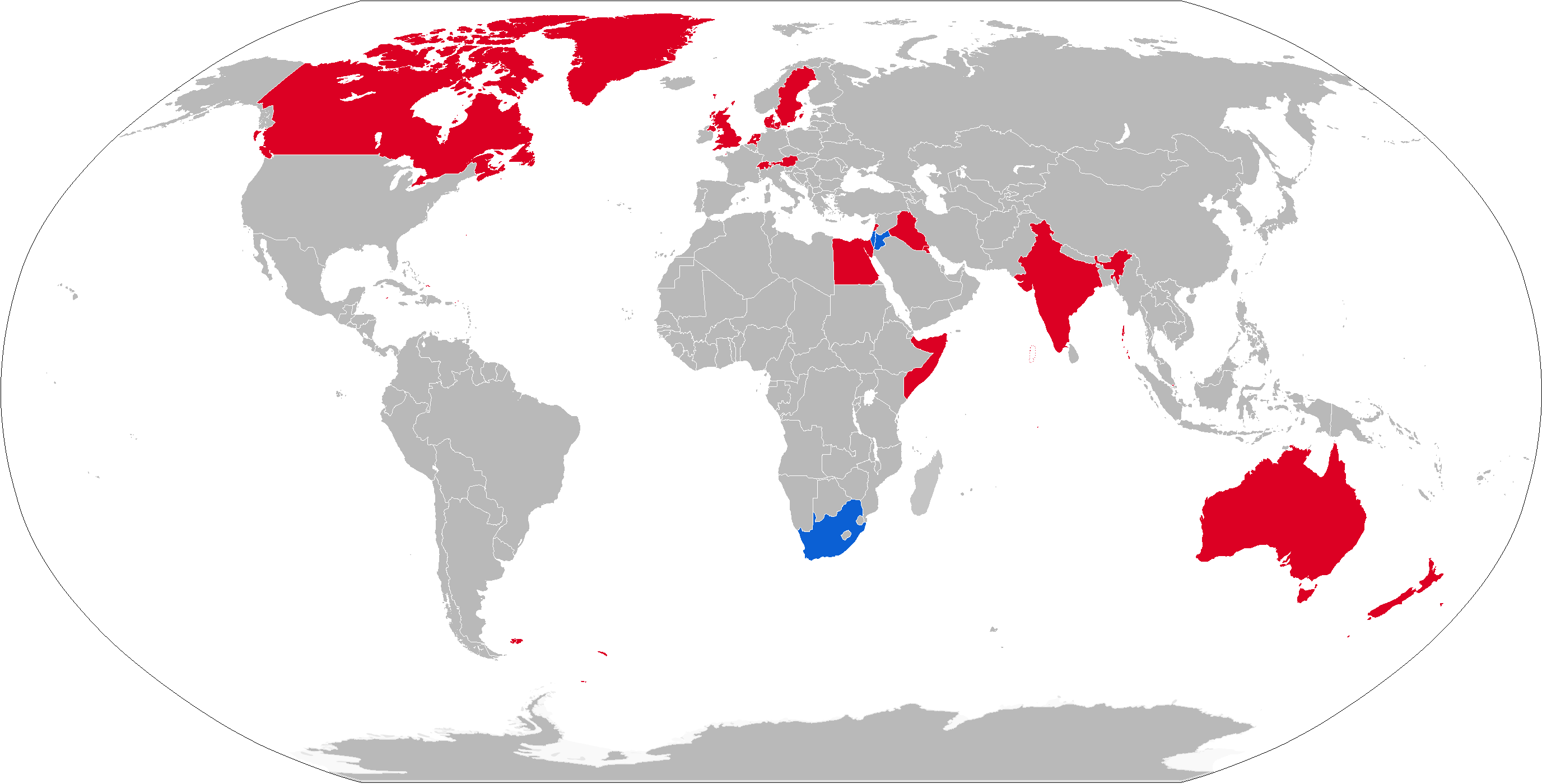
Operators Current Former

=== Current operators ===
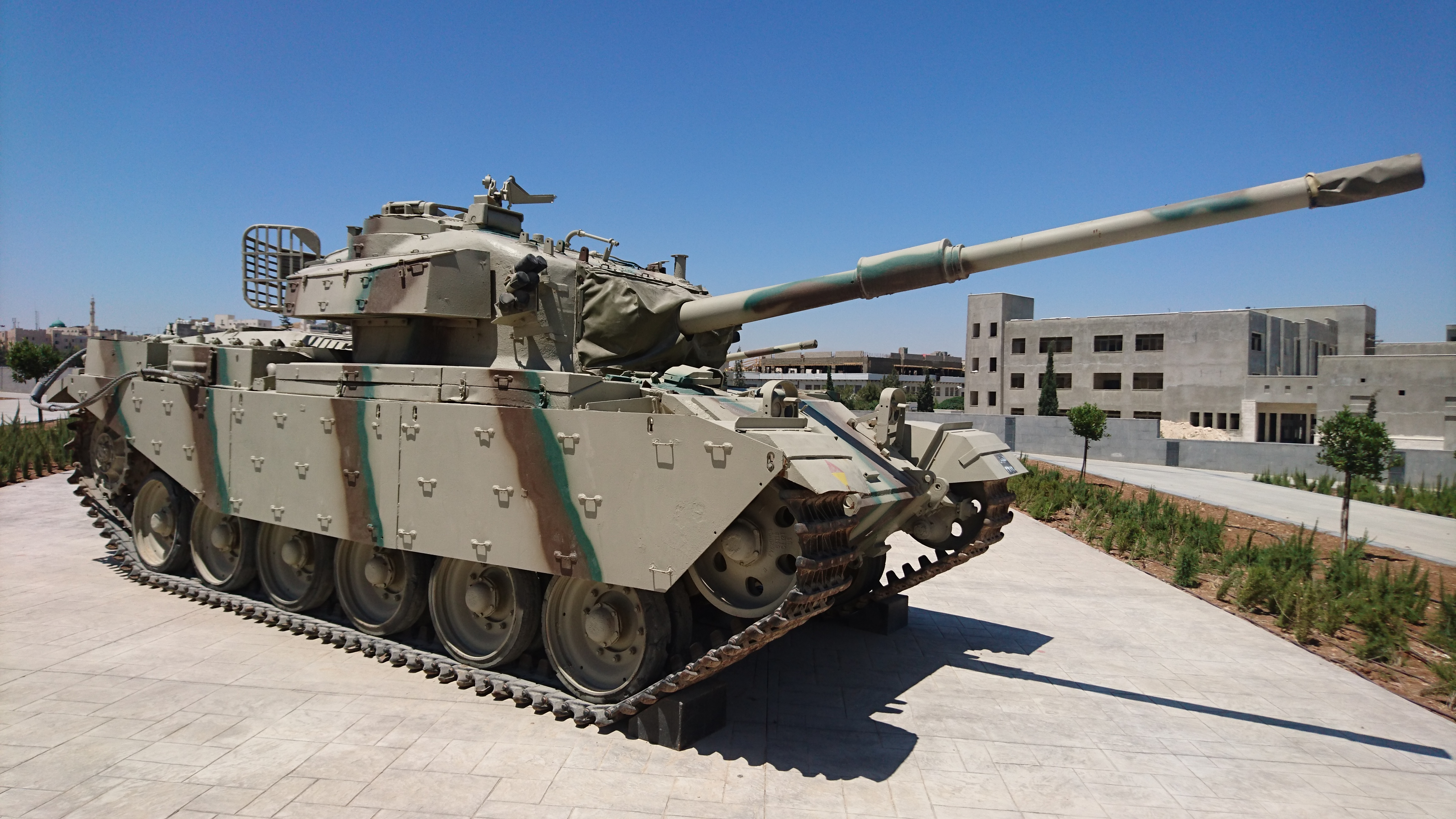
Jordanian Tariq at the Royal Tank Museum, Amman

- Israel: Gun tanks retired, many hulls converted to Nagmachon and Nakpadon APCs or Puma CEVs, as well as ARVs (tachlaz) and bridge layer (Tagash) variants.
- Jordan: Chassis re-used for the modern Temsah APC
- South Africa: In service as the indigenously developed and upgraded Mk1A/B and Mk2 Olifant tank

=== Former operators ===
- Australia: Replaced by Leopard 1.
- Austria: Now fixed in bunkers.
- Canada: Initially ordered 274 Mk 3 tanks, plus nine armoured recovery vehicles and four bridge-layers and additional orders followed. The Mk 5 (upgunned to 105 mm) were used later. From 1969 to 1970, the Canadian Army lists 77 tanks based in Germany (mostly Mk 5 and Mk 11's) and the remainder in Canada (60 at CFB Wainwright AB, 59 at CFSD Longue-Pointe QC, 46 at CFB Gagetown NB, 30 at CFB Borden, 29 at CFB Meaford ON, 27 at CFB Calgary AB, 12 at CFB Petawawa ON, six at RCEME School Kingston ON and one at the LETE Test Establishment Orleans, CFB Ottawa ON) for a total of 347 tanks (including 120 Mk 5s, three Mk 5 recovery tanks and some Mk 11s with IR and ranging guns fitted). Replaced by Leopard C1. Many of the tanks were sold to Israel, which converted them to diesel. Some are still in use as variants.
- Denmark: 216 tanks plus 14 armoured recovery vehicles and 4 bridge-layers all types augmented by Leopard 1 variants
- Egypt: Replaced by T-55s, T-62s, M60A3s and M1A1s.
- India: Retired
- Iraq: Retired
- Kuwait: 50. Handed over to Somalia in the later half of 1979.

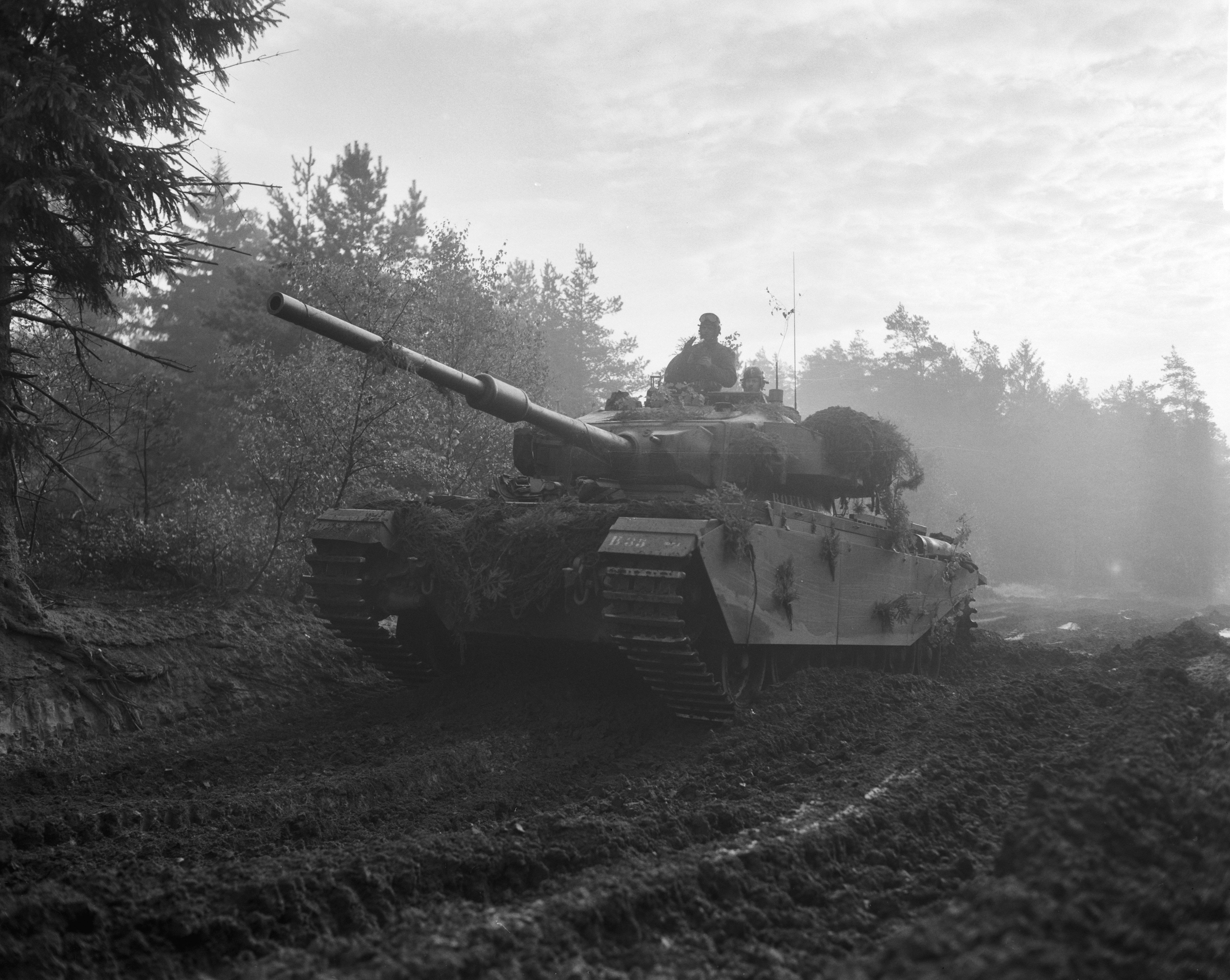
Dutch Centurion Mk 3 in 1961.

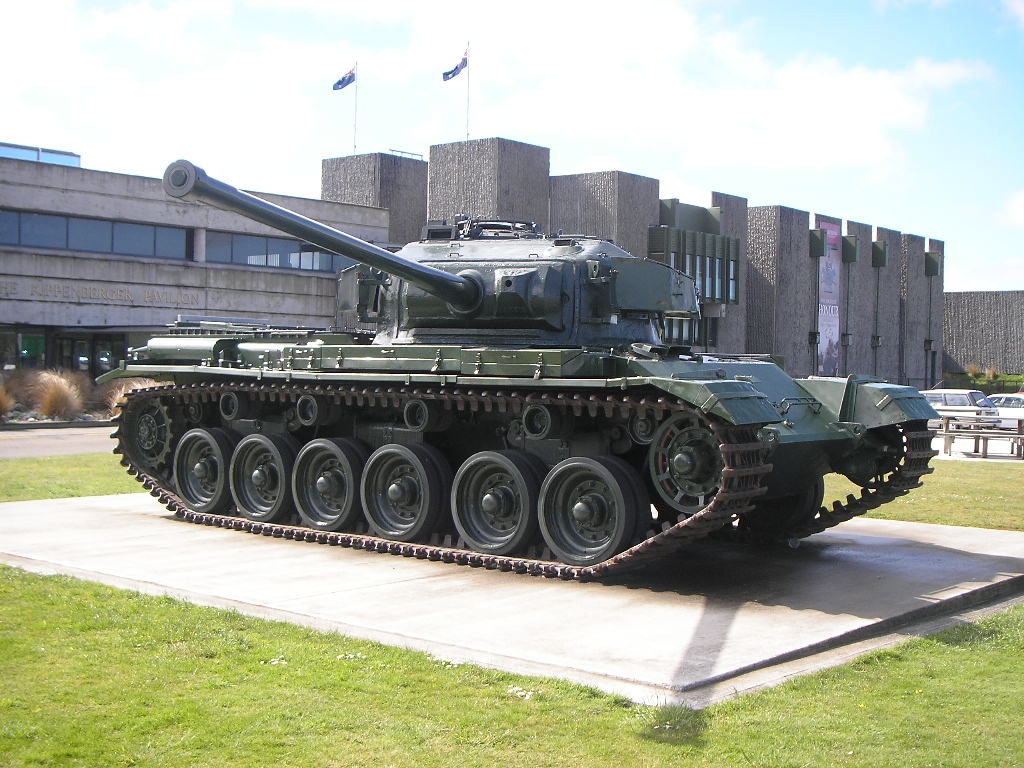
Centurion tank on display at the National Army Museum – Waiouru, New Zealand

- Netherlands: Initially received 435 Mk 3 tanks beginning in 1953, increased to 592 by 1956; all were paid for by the United States as part of the Mutual Defense Assistance Act. They replaced the Sherman and Ram tanks of the Royal Netherlands Army. As one was lost to an accidental fire in 1953, 591 gun tanks were on strength, and were soon upgraded to Mk 5 standard with 20-pounder gun and the British radio sets replaced by American types; one fuel mono-trailer was also available per tank. From 1956 to 1958, 66 ARV Mk 2s were procured, and in 1959–60, 70 Mk 7 tanks were delivered from the UK; these were all held in war reserve until 1969, when they were disposed of. Over the years 1960–72, 343 Mk 5 tanks were gradually upgunned with 105 mm guns to Mk 5/2 standard, as were 19 Mk 7s (to Mk 7/2) in 1966–68. Between 1962 and 1965, 17 Mk 5 tanks were converted to bridge layers, using the same bridge and mechanism as the American M48 and M60 AVLBs; at the same time, another 17 Mk 5s with 20-pounder guns were converted to dozer tanks. As an experiment, one Mk 5/2 and one Mk 7/2 were converted by installing a diesel engine in 1968; though successful, it was not adopted because the cost approached that of buying a new Leopard 1. All Centurions were replaced by Leopard 2 MBTs in the 1980s, after having been used alongside Leopard 1s in the 1970s. Many Mk 5 and all Mk 7 tanks were returned to the United States (which had paid for them), which appears to have shipped most to Israel.
- New Zealand: Used 12 vehicles in the variant Mk 3 (three tanks) from UK, Mk 5 and 5/1 (total eight tanks) from British Army in Hong Kong and one ARV from UK. Retired from services in 1968 and seven tanks together with the ARV sold to Australia. Two have been preserved and have been handed over to the museum. The other two went to the Waiouru training ground as hard range targets.
- Socialist Republic of Romania: Defector Ion Mihai Pacepa claimed Romania received one example from Israel in 1978 in exchange for increased immigration of Romanian Jews to Israel. Pacepa further states that Nicolae Ceaușescu had planned to produce the Centurion under license.
- Singapore: 63 Centurion Mk3 and Mk7s bought from India in 1975 and more from Israel in 1993–1994, all upgraded to Israeli standard with new main guns and diesel engines It has since been placed into storage and replaced by the Leopard 2SGs.
- Somalia: Christopher F. Foss, writing in the second edition of Jane's Main Battle Tanks said that 'Kuwait was believed to have supplied Somalia with about 35 Centurions.' The Military Balance 1987–88 (p. 112) listed 30 Centurions held by the Somali Army.
- Sweden: Replaced by Stridsvagn 121 (Leopard 2A4)
- Switzerland: Replaced by Leopard 2
- United Kingdom: Replaced by Chieftain

== See also ==
=== Tanks of comparable role, performance and era ===
- T-54/55 (Soviet Union)
- T-62 (Soviet Union)
- M26 Pershing (US)
- M46 Patton (US)
- M47 Patton (US)
- M48 Patton (US)
