= Tortoise heavy assault tank =

British assault gun design/prototype

Tank, Heavy Assault, Tortoise (A39)
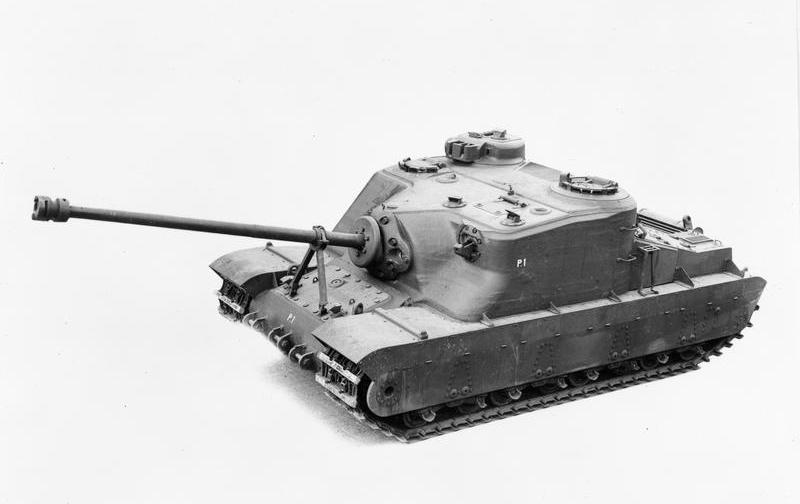
- The Assault Tank A39 Tortoise
- Type: Assault gun / heavy tank
- Place of origin: United Kingdom

Production history
- Designed: 1944
- Manufacturer: Nuffield Mechanizations & Aero
- Produced: 1945–1947
- No. built: 6

Specifications
- Mass: 78 long tons (87 short tons; 79 t)
- Length: 32 ft 10 in (10 m); Hull: 23 ft 9 in (7.24 m)
- Width: 12 ft 10 in (3.9 m)
- Height: 9 ft 10 in (3 m)
- Crew: 7 (Commander, gunner, 2 machine gunners, 2 loaders, driver)
- Armour: 178–228 mm (7–9 in); 33 mm (1.3 in) top
- Main armament: Ordnance QF 32 pounder (94 mm gun)
- Secondary armament: 2 × 7.92 mm Besa machine guns (top turret); 1 × 7.92 mm Besa machine gun (bow)
- Engine: Rolls-Royce Meteor V12 petrol 650 bhp (480 kW)
- Power/weight: 7.7 hp/tonne
- Transmission: 6 speeds forward and reverse
- Suspension: torsion bar box bogie
- Operational range: Road: 87 mi (140 km)
- Maximum speed: Road: 12 mph (20 km/h); Off-road: 4 mph (6 km/h)
- References: Chamberlain & Ellis

The Tortoise heavy assault tank (A39) was a British heavy assault gun tank design developed during the Second World War, but never put into mass production. It was developed for the task of clearing heavily fortified areas such as the Siegfried Line and as a result favoured armour protection over mobility.

Although heavy, at 78 tons, and not readily transported, it was considered reliable and a good gun platform.

Only a few prototypes of the Tortoise had been produced by the end of the war. After testing was complete, one was retained for preservation and the others disposed of.

== Development ==
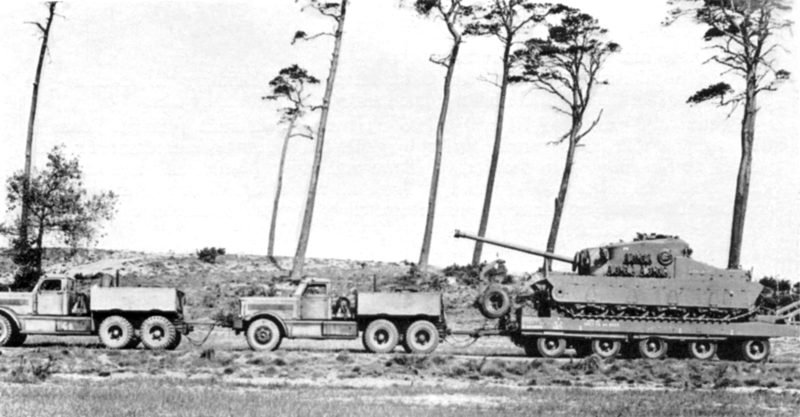
The A39 Tortoise being towed on an 80-ton trailer by two Diamond T's during trials in BAOR, 1948

In the early part of 1943, the Allied forces anticipated considerable resistance in the projected future invasion of Europe, with the enemy fighting from heavily fortified positions such as the Siegfried Line. As a result, a new class of vehicles emerged, in the shape of assault tanks, which placed maximum armour protection at a higher priority than mobility. Initially, work was concentrated on the Excelsior tank (A33), based on the Cromwell tank. There was also a programme to upgrade the armour of the Churchill tank. For similar work in the Far East, the Valiant tank (A38), based on the Valentine tank was considered, although weight was specified to be as low as possible.

The Secretary of State for War (James Grigg) and the Minister of Supply (Andrew Duncan) issued a Joint Memorandum in April 1943 that gave a vague specification for an assault tank, classing it as a special purpose vehicle to operate in heavily defended areas as part of the specialist 79th Armoured Division.

The Nuffield Organization responded with 18 separate designs (AT1 through AT18) drafted between May 1943 and February 1944, each design larger and heavier than the last. By February 1944, design AT16 was complete and was approved by the Tank Board, who proposed that month that 25 should be produced directly from the mockup stage without bothering with a prototype, to be available for operational service in September 1945. An order for 25 was placed by the War Office and work was begun.

After the war the order was reduced and only six vehicles were built. One was sent to Germany for trials, where it was found to be mechanically reliable with a powerful and accurate gun. However, at a weight of 80 tons and a height of 10 feet (3.0 m) it was extremely slow and difficult to transport.

== Description ==
The primary requirement for an assault tank is armour, to enable the tank to assault a heavily emplaced enemy. This led to Tortoise having very thick armour, arranged as a one piece casemate to avoid the weak spots of a turret design. This differs from the design of other wartime era assault tanks, the Excelsior tank and assault tank T14.

Since the Tortoise had a fixed casemate superstructure instead of a turret, it can be classified as a self-propelled gun or an assault gun. The crew included a commander, driver, and gunner, with two loaders for the 32-pounder gun and two machine gunners.

Internally, it was split into three compartments: the transmission to the front, the crew in the centre and the Rolls-Royce Meteor engine at the rear. The suspension consisted of four bogies on each side of the hull. Each bogie had two pairs of wheels, with each pair linked to a transverse torsion bar. The Merritt-Brown transmission was fitted with an all speed reverse, giving approximately the same speed backwards as forwards.

== Armament ==
The Ordnance QF 32-pounder gun design was adapted from the British 3.7 inch anti-aircraft gun. The ammunition used a separate charge and shell, the latter a thirty-two-pound (15 kg) armour piercing shot (APCBC). In tests, the gun was successful against a German Panther tank at nearly 1,000 yards (910 m).

The 32-pdr gun was mounted in a power-assisted limited traverse mounting; rather than being mounted on the more traditional trunnions, it protruded through a large ball mount in the front of the hull, protected by 225 mm (8.9 in) armour. To the left of it was a Besa machine gun in an armoured ball mount. A further two Besa machine guns were mounted in a turret on the top of the hull to the right.

== Surviving vehicles ==
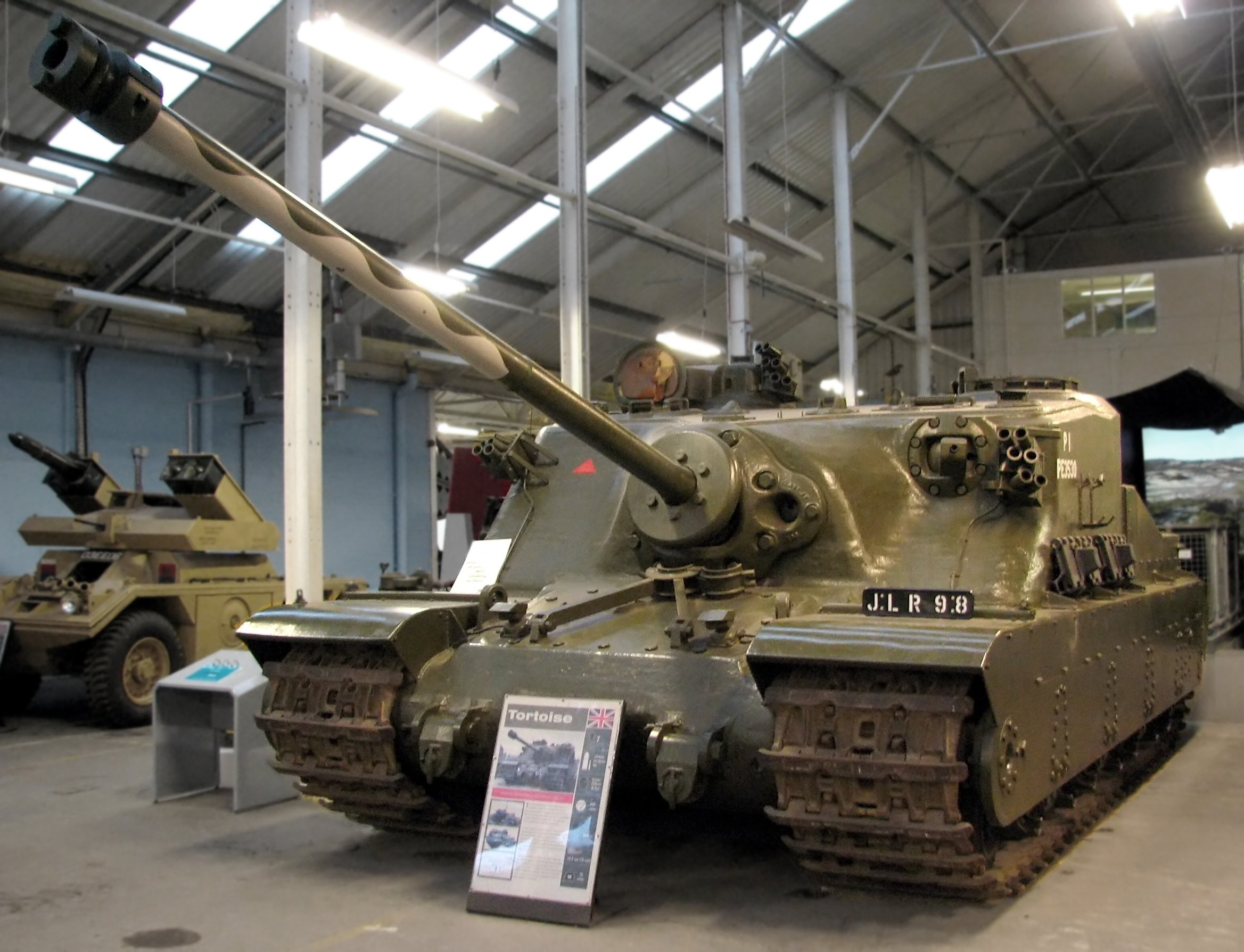
The Tortoise at The Tank Museum (2008)

- One of the six prototype Tortoises constructed of mild steel (Note: It is normal for armoured vehicle prototypes to be built using mild steel instead of armour plate. Besides being cheaper to produce, mild steel is also readily available and easier to work.) has been preserved at The Tank Museum in Bovington, England. The vehicle is in running condition. A 2011 overhaul saw it running under its own power for the first time since the 1950s. It was shown to the public in June 2011 at Tankfest 2011, the Bovington museum's annual display of running vehicles.
- A Tortoise, without its gun, lies on the former Kirkcudbright military training area (now a Site of Special Scientific Interest) in Scotland. The location and condition of the vehicle mean that recovery and restoration is unlikely.
- Another Tortoise was used as a target on Lulworth Ranges, Dorset in the early 1970s. By August 1974 it was little more than a metal shell.

== See also ==
- Other assault tanks:
  - Valiant tank
  - Excelsior tank
  - T14 heavy tank
- T28 super-heavy tank – a comparable US project, few prototypes built
- Super-heavy tank
- Object 704 – a similar Soviet vehicle. It was a variant of the existing ISU 152 assault gun, but with added armour. One prototype was built.
- SU-100Y – another Soviet SPG intended to deal against enemy fortifications and heavy-armoured tanks
