= T14 tank =

T14 tank may refer to:

- T-14 Armata, a Russian main battle tank to enter service in 2019 or later
- T14 heavy tank, a joint American and British project to develop a heavy tank cancelled in 1944
