= Valentine tank =

British infantry tank

Tank, Infantry, Valentine, Mk I–XI
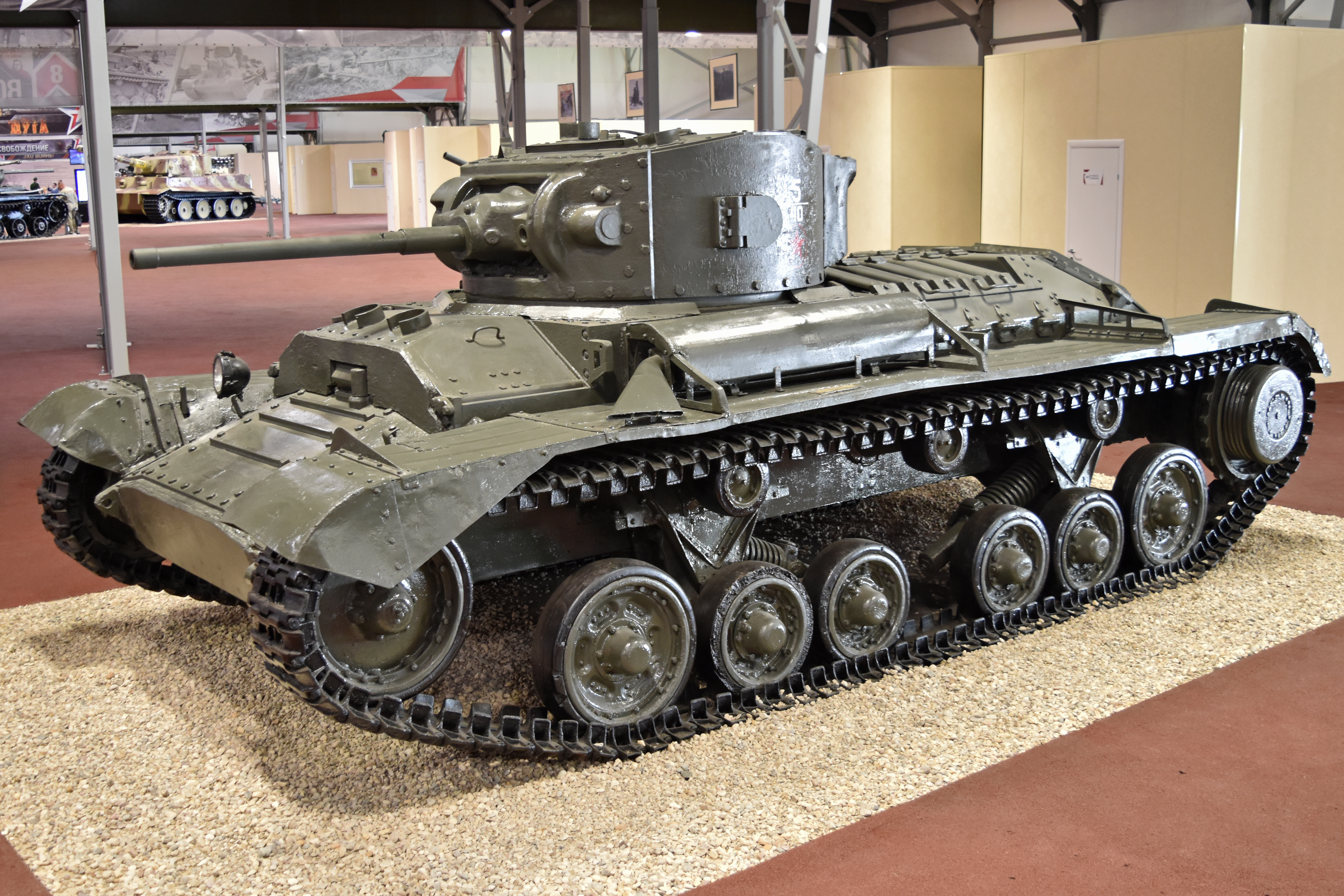
- Valentine II at Patriot Park, Russia
- Type: Infantry tank
- Place of origin: United Kingdom

Service history
- In service: 1940–1960
- Used by: British Army, Red Army, New Zealand Army
- Wars: World War II; 1948 Arab–Israeli War; Cyprus crisis of 1963–64

Production history
- Designer: Vickers-Armstrongs
- Designed: 1938
- Manufacturer: Vickers-Armstrongs and others
- Produced: 1940–1944
- No. built: 8,275 (6,855 built in UK and 1,420 in Canada)

Specifications
- Mass: about 16 long tons (16 t)
- Length: hull: 17 ft 9 in (5.41 m)
- Width: 8 ft 7.5 in (2.629 m)
- Height: 7 ft 5.5 in (2.273 m)
- Crew: Mk I, II, IV, VI–XI: 3 (Commander, gunner, driver); Mk III, V: 4 (+ loader)
- Armour: 0.31–2.56 in (8–65 mm)
- Main armament: Mk I–VII: QF 2-pounder (40 mm); Mk VIII–X: QF 6-pounder (57 mm); Mk XI: QF 75 mm Mk IIICS QF 3-inch (76 mm)
- Secondary armament: Mk I–VII, X, XI: 7.92 mm BESA machine-gun with 3,150 rounds
- Engine: Mk I: AEC A189 9.6 litre petrol Mk II, III, VI: AEC A190 diesel Mk IV, V, VII–XI: GMC 6004 diesel 131–165 hp (97–121 kW)
- Power/weight: 12.4 hp (9.2 kW) / tonne
- Transmission: Meadows Type 22 (5 speed and reverse)
- Suspension: modified three-wheel Horstmann suspension "Slow Motion"
- Fuel capacity: 36 gallons internal
- Operational range: 90 mi (140 km) on roads
- Maximum speed: 15 mph (24 km/h) on roads
- Steering system: clutch and brake

The Tank, Infantry, Mk III, Valentine was an infantry tank produced in the United Kingdom during World War II. More than 8,000 Valentines were produced in eleven marks, plus specialised variants, accounting for about a quarter of wartime British tank production. The variants included riveted and welded construction, petrol and diesel engines and increases in armament. It was supplied in large numbers to the USSR and built under licence in Canada. It was used by the British in the North African campaign. Developed by Vickers, it proved to be strong and reliable.

== Name ==
There are several proposed explanations for the name Valentine. According to the most popular one, the design was presented to the War Office on St Valentine's Day, 14 February 1940, although some sources say that the design was submitted on Valentine's Day 1938 or 10 February 1938. White notes that "incidentally" Valentine was the middle name of Sir John Carden, the man responsible for many tank designs including that of the Valentine's predecessors, the A10 and A11. (Note: Sir John had died three years before in an aircraft accident.) Another version says that Valentine is an acronym for Vickers-Armstrongs Limited Elswick & (Newcastle-upon) Tyne. The "most prosaic" explanation according to author David Fletcher is that it was just an in-house codeword of Vickers with no other significance.

== Development ==
The Valentine started as a proposal based on Vickers' experience with the A9 and A10 specification cruiser tanks and the A11 (Infantry Tank Mk I). As a private design by Vickers-Armstrongs, it did not receive a General Staff "A" designation; it was submitted to the War Office on 10 February 1938. The development team tried to match the lower weight of a cruiser tank, allowing the suspension and transmission parts of the A10 heavy cruiser to be used, with the greater armour of an infantry tank, working to a specification for a 60 mm (2.4 in) armour basis (the same as the A.11). (Note: That the armour was to be as effective as a vertical 60 mm (2.4 in) plate.)

The tank was to carry a 2-pounder gun in a two-man turret (the A.11 was armed only with a heavy machine gun), a lower silhouette and be as light as possible, resulting in a very compact vehicle with a cramped interior. Compared to the earlier Infantry Tank Mk II "Matilda", the Valentine had somewhat weaker armour and almost the same top speed. By using components already proven on the A9 and A10, the new design was easier to produce and much less expensive.

The War Office was initially deterred by the size of the turret, since they considered a turret crew of three necessary, to free the vehicle commander from direct involvement in operating the gun. Concerned by the situation in Europe, it finally approved the design in April 1939 and placed the first order in July for deliveries in May 1940. At the start of the war, Vickers were instructed to give priority to the production of tanks. The vehicle reached trials in May 1940, which coincided with the loss of much of the army's equipment in France, during Operation Dynamo, the evacuation from Dunkirk. The trials were successful and the vehicle was rushed into production as "Tank, Infantry, Mark III"; no pilot models were required as much of the mechanics had been proven on the A10 and 109 had been built by the end of September. During late 1940 and early 1941, Valentines were used as cruiser tanks in British-based armoured divisions and they were supplied to tank brigades of the Eighth Army in North Africa from June 1941.

== Production ==
The development path of the Valentine tank.

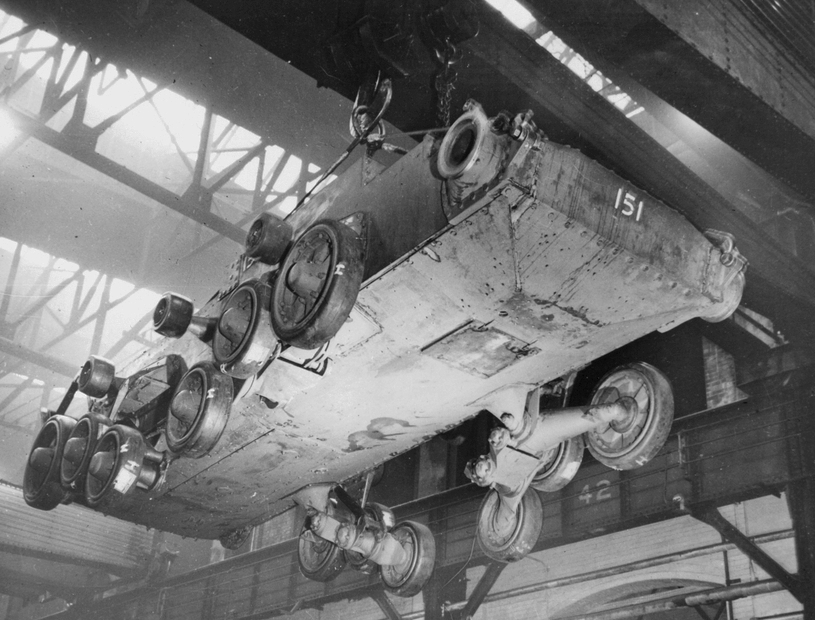
Chassis of a Valentine tank at the Angus shops

Metropolitan-Cammell Carriage & Wagon—an associate company of Vickers—and Birmingham Railway Carriage & Wagon Company (BRCW) were contracted to produce the Valentine. Metropolitan and the BRCW had built small numbers of the A10, their production runs were just finishing and they delivered their first Valentines in mid-1940. Metropolitan used two sites, with Wednesbury joined by their Midland site in production of the Valentine. Vickers output started at ten per month rising to 45 per month in a year and peaking at 20 per week in 1943, before production was slowed and then production of the Valentine and derivatives stopped in 1945. Vickers-Armstrong produced 2,515 vehicles and Metropolitan 2,135; total UK production was 6,855 tanks, with 2,394 exported from Britain to the Soviet Union under lend-lease.

To develop its own tank forces, Canada had established tank production facilities. An order was placed in 1940 with Canadian Pacific and after modifications to the Valentine design to use local standards and materials, the production prototype was finished in 1941. Canadian production was mainly at CPR Angus Shops in Montreal and 1,420 were produced in Canada, of which 1,388 were sent to the Soviet-Union. The Valentines formed the main Commonwealth export to the Soviet Union under lend-lease. The remaining 32 were retained for training. The use of local GMC Detroit Diesel two-stroke engines in Canadian production was a success and the engine was adopted for British production. The British and Canadians produced 8,275 Valentines, making it the most produced British tank design of the war.

== Vehicle layout ==
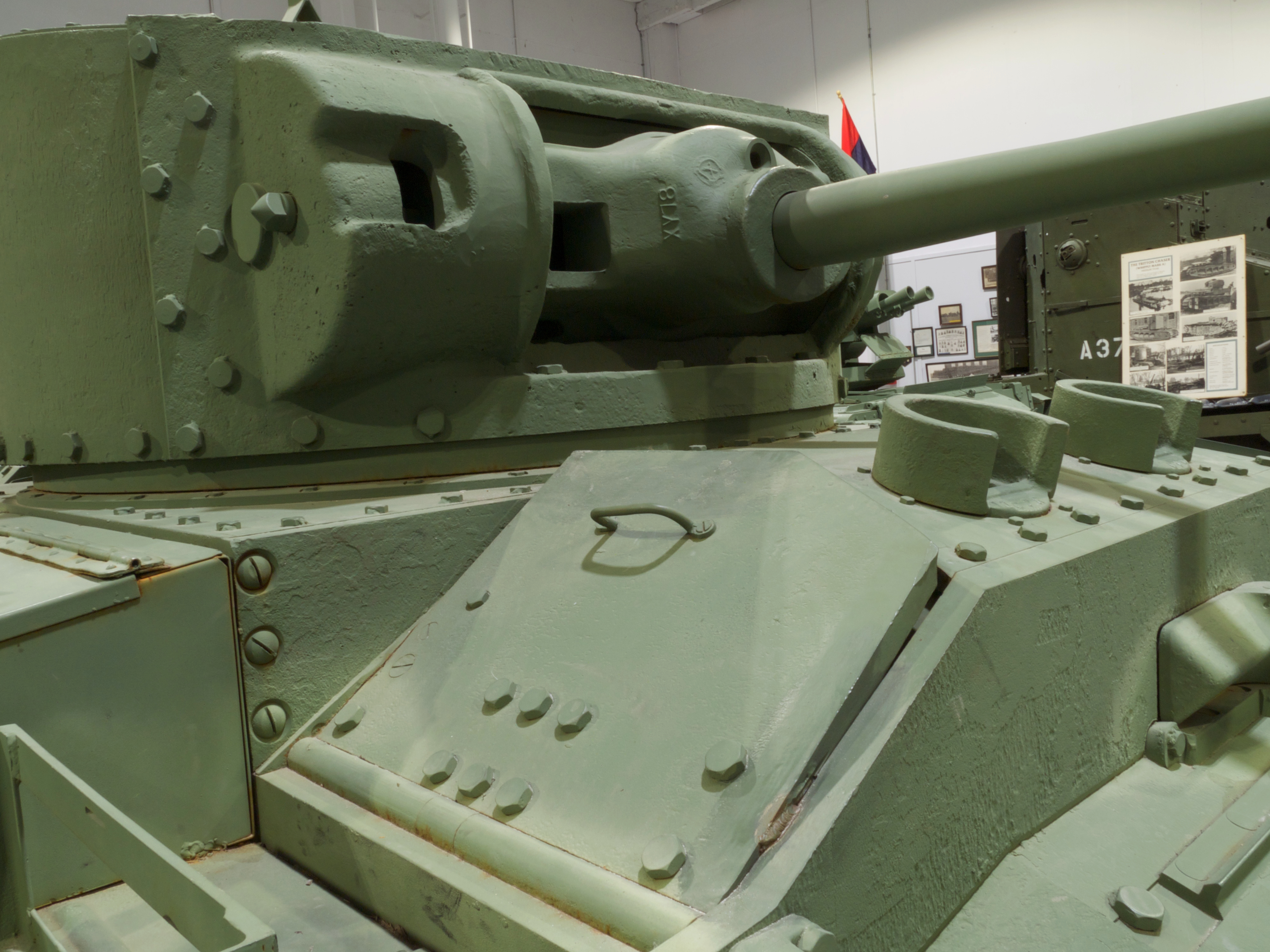
Driver's position of Mark VI tank, both periscopes and hatch visible.

The Valentine was of conventional layout, divided internally into three compartments; from front to back the driver's position, the fighting compartment with the turret and then the engine and transmission driving the tracks through rear sprockets. The driver's area contained only the driver and the driving controls. The driver sat on hull centre line, entering through either of two angled hatches over the seat, though there was an emergency exit hatch beneath his seat. The driver had a direct vision port—cut in what was one of the hull cross members—in front of him and two periscopes in the roof over his head. Driving was by clutch and brake steering through levers, whose control rods ran the length of the hull to the transmission at the rear.

Behind the driver was a bulkhead that formed another hull cross-member and separated him from the fighting compartment. The first tanks had a two-man turret, the gunner on the left of the gun and the commander acting also as the loader on the right. When three-man turrets were introduced, the commander sat to the rear of the turret. The turret was made up of a cast front and a cast rear riveted to the side plates which were of rolled steel. All tanks carried the radio in the turret rear. Early tanks used the Wireless set No. 11 with a Tannoy for the crew; later tanks had Wireless Set No. 19, which included crew communications with long and short range networks.

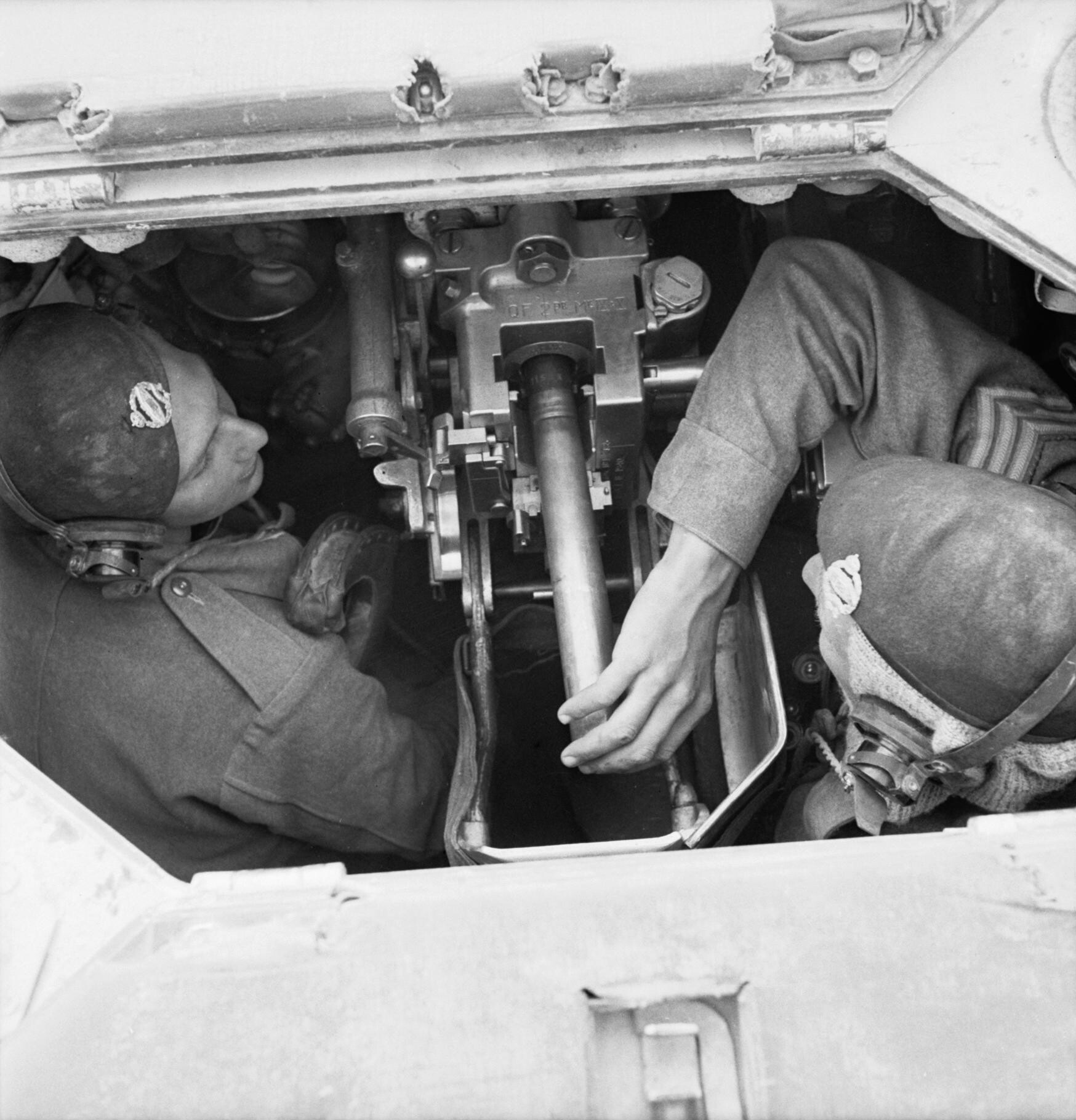
View into Valentine turret of crew loading the 2-pounder gun

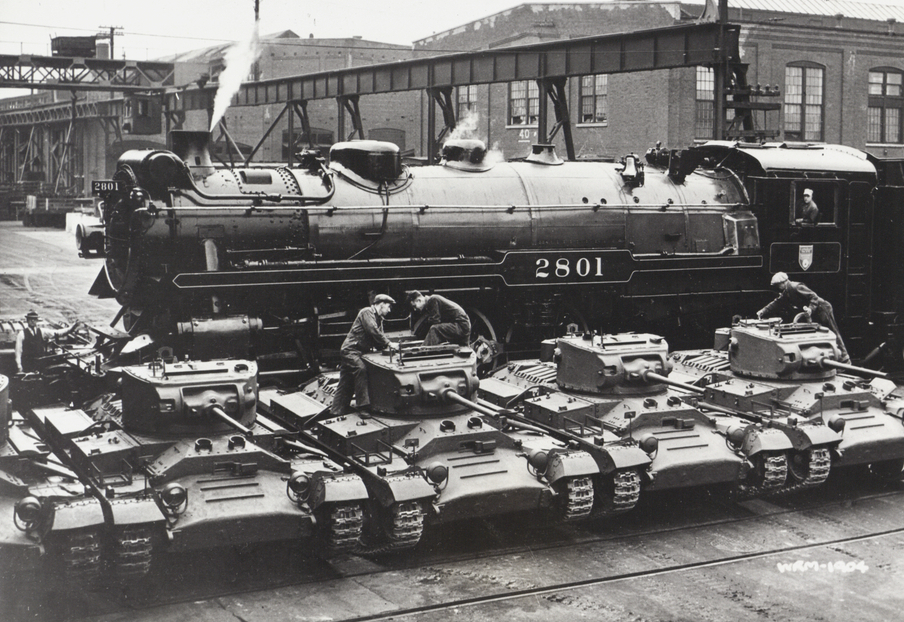
Valentine tanks lined-up in front of a locomotive in Canada

Turret rotation was by electric motor controlled by the gunner, with a hand-wheel for manual backup. The restrictions that the two-man turret placed on the commander, made more so if they were a troop commander and responsible for directing the actions of two other tanks besides their own, were addressed by enlarging the turret for the Mark III so that a loader for the main armament could be carried. The turret ring diameter was not changed, so the extra space was found by moving the gun mounting forward in an extended front plate and increasing the bulge in the rear of the turret. This increased weight by half a ton on the 2.5 long tons (2.5 t) two-man turret.

A bulkhead separated the fighting compartment from the engine compartment. The engine, clutch and gearbox were bolted together to form a single unit. The first Valentines used a petrol engine and the diesel engine which distinguished the Mark II—at the time Tank Infantry Mark III*— from the Mark I, was based on the AEC Comet, a commercial road vehicle engine. The Mark IV used a GMC Detroit Diesel; these were the majority of those used in the desert campaigns. The gearbox was a 5-speed, 1-reverse Meadows connected to the multiplate steering clutches which then fed epicyclic reduction gearboxes on the sides of the tanks. The brakes themselves were on the outside of the drive sprockets. The suspension was made up of two units on either side; each unit made up of a single 24 in (0.61 m) diameter wheel and two 19 1/2 in (0.50 m) wheels. Improved tracks were added to later marks.

== Combat history ==
=== North Africa ===
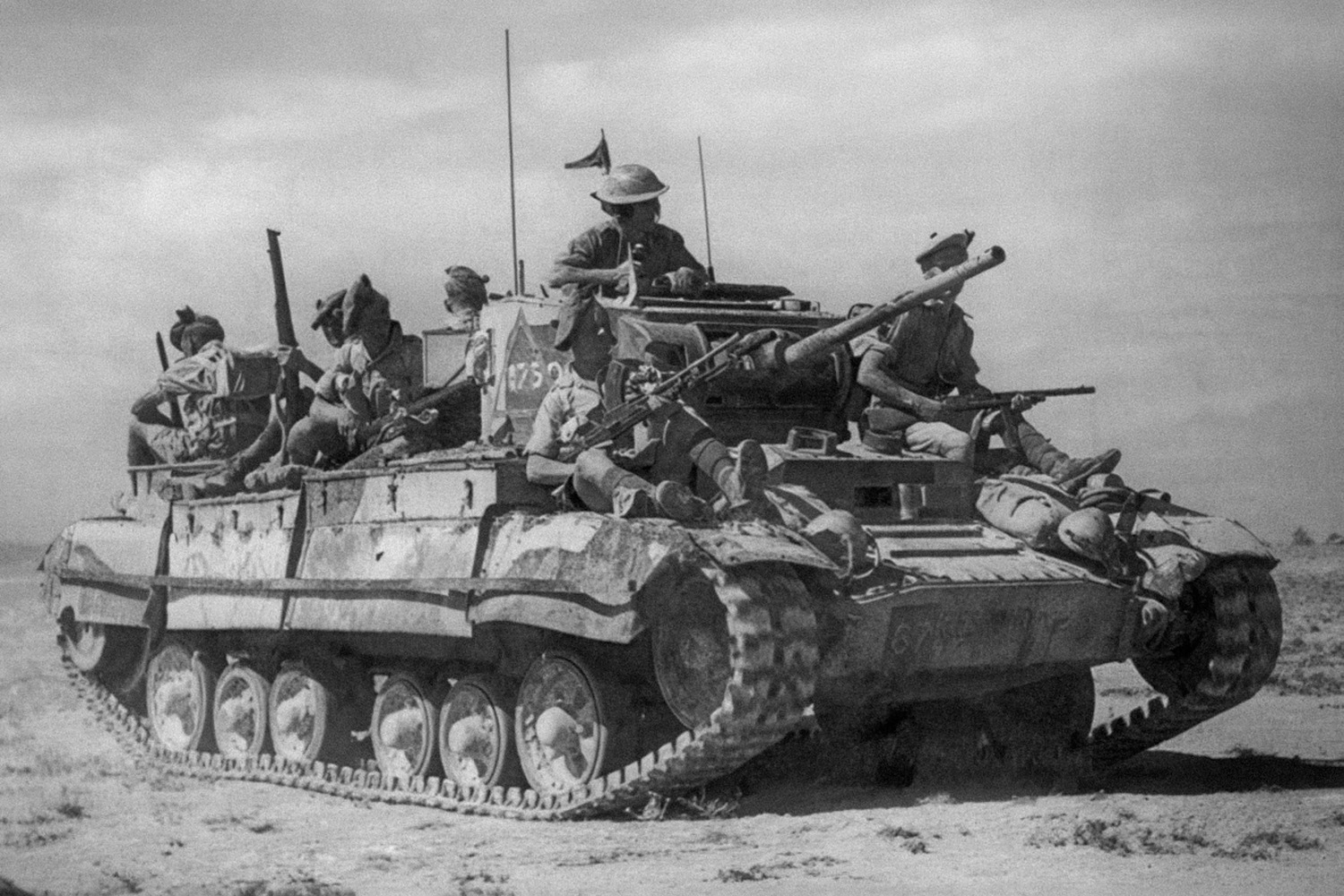
A Valentine in North Africa, carrying infantry from a Scottish regiment

The Valentine was extensively used in the North African Campaign, earning a reputation as a reliable and well-protected vehicle. The first Valentines went into action in December 1941 with the 8th Royal Tank Regiment in Operation Crusader. The tank first served in Operation Crusader in the North African desert, when it began to replace the Matilda Tank. Due to a lack of cruisers, it was issued to armoured regiments in the UK from mid-1941. The Valentine was better armed and faster than the Cruiser Mk II. During the pursuit from El Alamein in late 1942, some tanks had driven more than 3,000 miles (4,800 km) by the time the Eighth Army reached Tunisia.

The Valentine shared the common weakness of the British tanks of the period in that its 2-pounder gun lacked high-explosive (anti-personnel) ammunition and became outdated as an anti-tank weapon from late 1942. Introduction of the 6-pounder in British service was delayed until the loss of equipment in France had been made good, so the 2-pounder was retained for longer. The small size of the turret and of the turret ring meant that producing mountings for larger guns proved a difficult task. Although versions with the 6-pounder and then with the Ordnance QF 75 mm gun were developed, by the time they were available in significant numbers, better tanks had reached the battlefield. Another weakness was the small crew compartment and the two-man turret. A larger turret, with a loader position added, was used in some of the 2-pounder versions but the position had to be removed again in variants with larger guns. Its relatively low height was an advantage in a battlefield with little cover, allowing it to take up a "good hull-down position in any convenient fold in the ground".

=== Madagascar ===
Six Valentines of 'B' Special Service Squadron of the Royal Armoured Corps took part in the 1942 Battle of Madagascar with six Tetrarchs of 'C' Special Service Squadron.

=== Northwest Europe ===
By 1944, the Valentine had been almost replaced in front-line units of the European theatre by the Churchill tank (the Infantry Tank Mark IV) and the US-made M4 Sherman tank. A few were used for special purposes or as command vehicles for units equipped with the Archer self-propelled gun. The Royal Artillery used the Valentine XI (with 75 mm gun) as an OP command tank until the end of the war.

=== Pacific ===
In the Pacific War, 25 Valentine Mk III and nine Valentine Mk IIICS tanks were employed by the 3rd New Zealand Division in the Solomon Islands campaign. Trials in New Zealand had found that the locally developed 2 pounder HE shell lacked power, especially compared to the 18-pounder shell of the 3-inch howitzer, so 18 Valentine Mk III were converted to Valentine Mk IIICS standard by having their main armament replaced by the QF 3-inch howitzer taken from Matilda Mk IVCS tanks, surplus to New Zealand requirements. Other modifications to the nine Valentine Mk IIICS tanks deploying to the Pacific included infantry telephones (a means for infantry to talk to the tank commander). The converted tanks carried 21 HE and 14 smoke shells. The other nine 3-inch armed tanks and 16 normal Valentines (with 2-pounder guns) remained in New Zealand for training. The Valentine was retired from New Zealand service in 1960.

=== Eastern Front ===
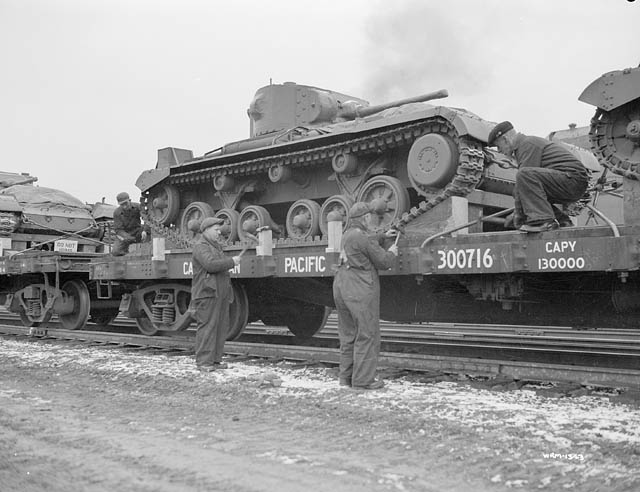
Valentines bound for the Soviet Union being loaded on Canadian Pacific Railway flat cars

Valentines, of all Marks except the Mark I, were sent to the USSR from 1941. The creation of Valentines tanks destined for use by the Soviet Union was a part of a campaign known as Aid to Russia Fund, headed by Clementine Churchill and heavily supported by the Communist Party of Great Britain. In Soviet service, the Valentine was used from the Battle of Moscow until the end of the war, mainly in the second line. Although criticised for its low speed and the 2-pounder gun, the Valentine was liked due to its small size, reliability and good armour protection. Initially the tracks gave some problems in winter; from freezing down to minus 20, snow packed into the tracks, though at below minus 20 it was not a problem. The problem was later solved.

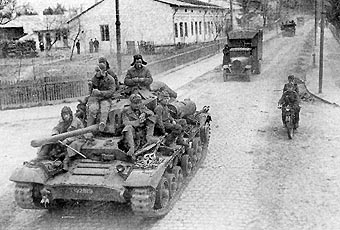
Soviet Valentine Mk IX during the Dnieper Offensive, 1943

Soviet Supreme Command asked for its production until the end of the war. In August 1945, as part of the Soviet invasion of Manchuria, the 267th Tank Regiment (40 Valentine III and IX) of the 59th Cavalry Division Red Army, together with the 65th T-34-85 43rd Tank Brigade, passed from Eastern Gobi across the mountains Greater Khingan to Kalgan in China.

=== Cyprus ===
The last use of a Valentine in combat is thought to have occurred during the Cyprus crisis of 1963–64. A turretless Valentine from a quarry was used by Greek militia, fitted with an improvised armoured casemate from which a gunner could fire a Bren gun. The vehicle is owned by the Cypriot National Guard, who intend to place it in a proposed new military museum.

== Variants ==
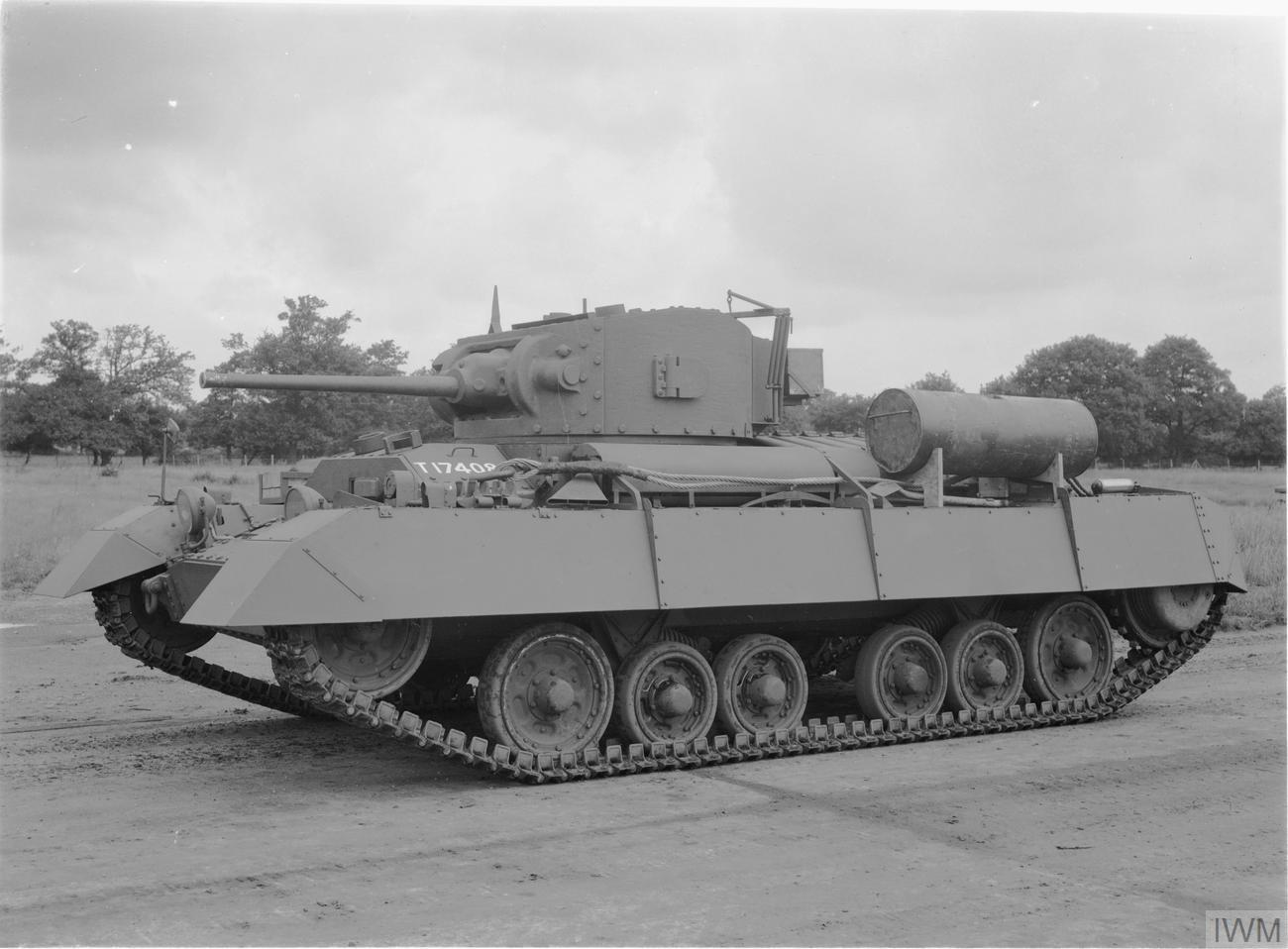
Valentine II

Valentine I (Tank, Infantry, Mk III): (308)

The first model of the Valentine; production was by Vickers, Metro-Cammell and Birmingham Railway The tank had a riveted hull, was powered by AEC A189 135 hp petrol engine and equipped with a 2-pounder gun and a coaxial Besa machine gun. Its two-man turret forced the commander to act as the loader.

Valentine II (Tank, Infantry, Mk III*): (700)

Until the Valentine name adopted in June 1941, known as "Tank, Infantry, Mark III*". (Note: The star in the name denoted a modification to the original design, in this case the engine change.) This model used AEC A190 131 hp 6-cylinder diesel engine. To increase its range in the desert, an auxiliary jettisonable external fuel tank was installed to the left of the engine compartment.

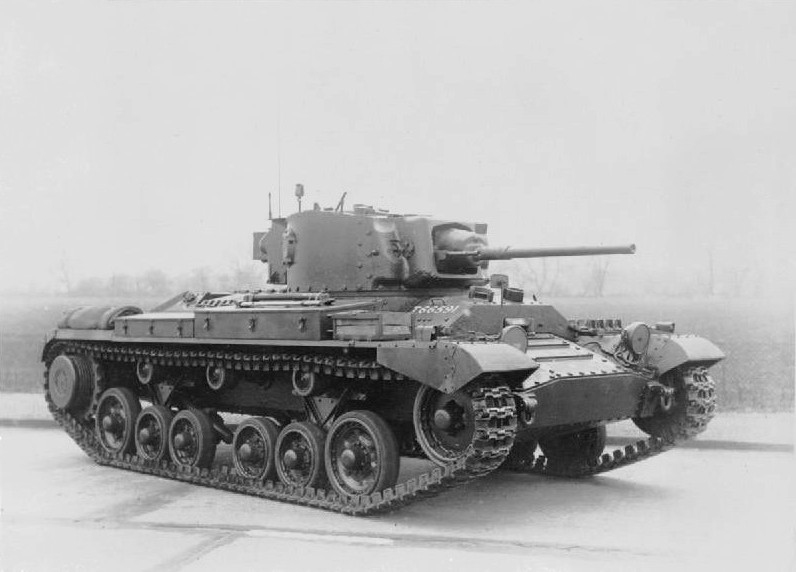
Valentine III. Note the different turret.

Valentine III

Modifications to the turret design – moving the front turret plate forward and a larger rear bulge – gave room for a loader to ease the duties of the commander. The side armour was reduced from 60 mm (2.4 in) to 50 mm (2.0 in) to save weight.

Valentine IIICS (Close Support)

New Zealand modification of 18 Valentine III carried out by replacing the 2 pounder with a 3" Howitzer from Matilda IVCS tanks. They were used in Guadalcanal in the Solomon Islands (see Battle of the Green Islands), and remained in service into the 1950s.

Valentine IV

A Mark II using an American 138 hp GMC 6004 diesel engine and US-made transmission. Though it had slightly shorter range, it was quieter and highly reliable. (Note: White gives 130 hp at 1,800 rpm)

Valentine V

As the Valentine III but with the GMC 6004 diesel and US-made transmission.

Valentine VI

Canadian-built version of Mk IV; initially known as Tank, Infantry Mark III***. It used some Canadian and American mechanical parts and a GMC diesel engine. Late production vehicles had cast glacis detail, along with more use of cast sections instead of fabricated ones. The first fifteen were produced with a 7.92 mm Besa coaxial machine-gun, thereafter replaced by a coaxial 0.30-inch Browning machine-gun.

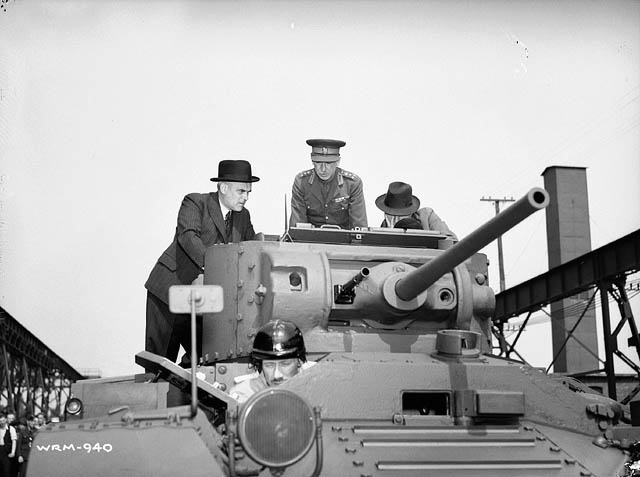
The first tank to be manufactured in Canada, a Valentine VI, being inspected by C. D. Howe, the Canadian Minister of Munitions and Supply, in May 1941

Valentine VII

Another Canadian version, it was essentially the VI with internal changes and No. 19 Wireless replaced the No. 11 radio set.

Valentine VIIA

Mark VII with jettisonable fuel tanks, new studded tracks, oil cooler and protected headlights.

Valentine VIII

AEC diesel engine and turret modification to take 6-pounder gun; meant the loss of the coaxial machine-gun. Never built due to being inferior to Mk IX.

Valentine IX

A V upgraded to the 6-pounder gun as VIII. Similar armour reduction as on the Mk VIII; on late production units an upgraded, 165 hp version of the GMC 6004 diesel was installed, somewhat improving mobility.

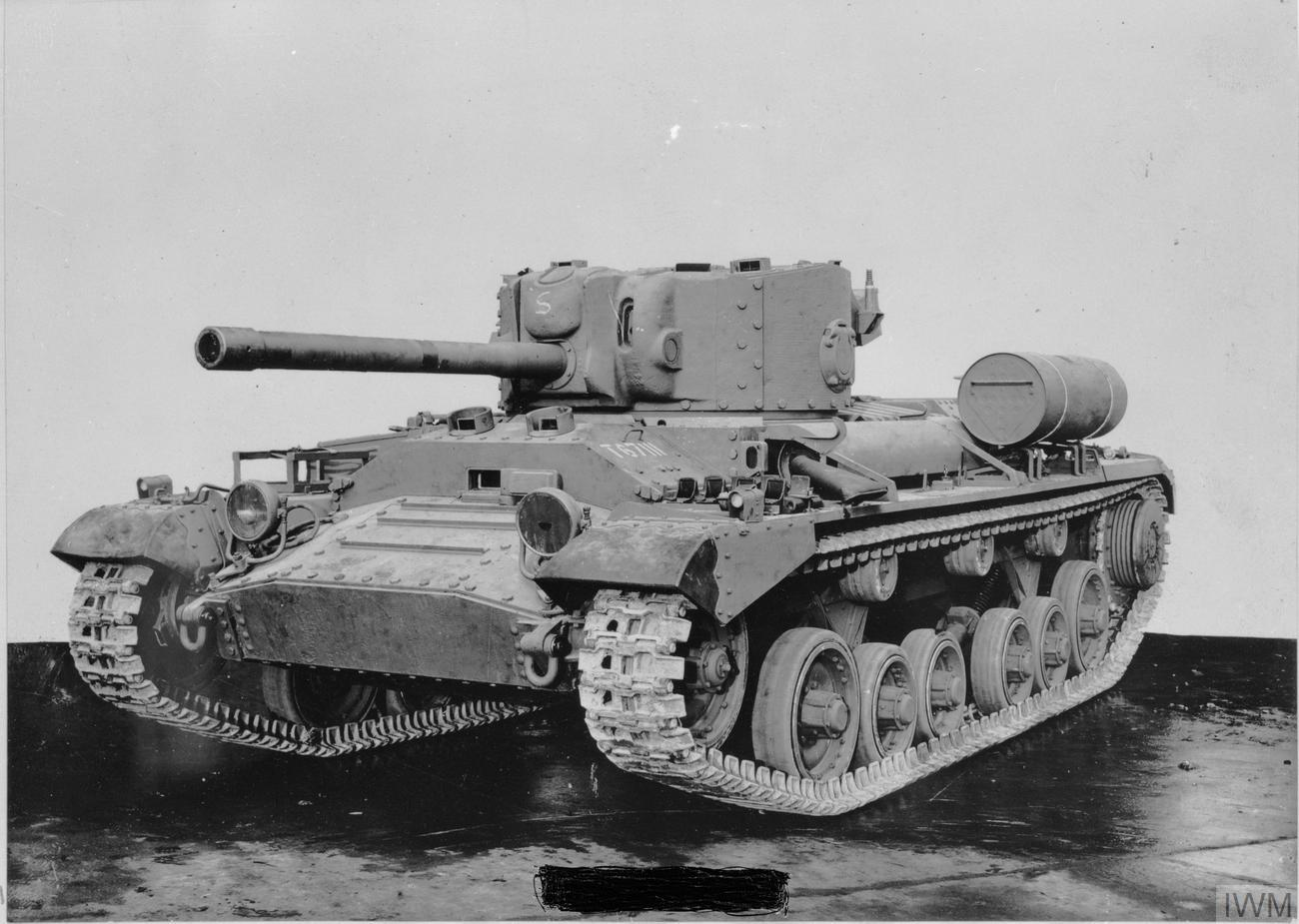
The Valentine IX. This was armed with the QF 6-Pounder gun with many of these being sent to Russia under Lend-Lease

Valentine X(135)

New turret design so that a Besa coaxial machine-gun could be mounted again. Welded construction; the 165 hp engine was used in place of the 130 hp engine in some production.

Valentine XI

An X upgraded with the OQF 75 mm gun and a welded construction. The Canadian cast nose introduced into British production, only used as a command tank.

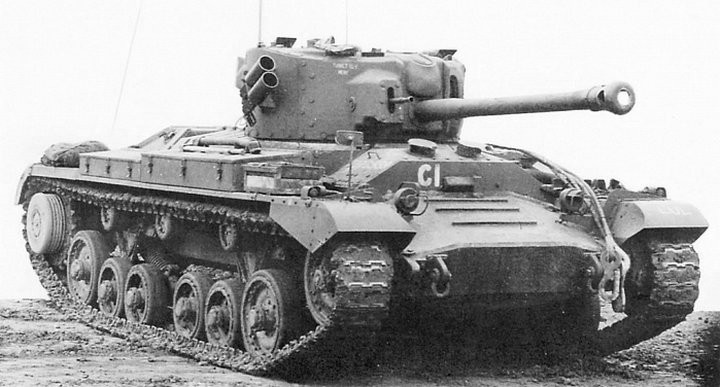
The Valentine XI. Armed with the 75 mm gun

Valentine DD

Valentine Mk V, IX and Mk XI, made amphibious by the use of Nicholas Straussler's "Duplex Drive". Conversions by Metro-Cammell of 625 tanks delivered in 1943–1944. Used by crews training for the M4 Sherman DD tanks for the Normandy Landings as well as training in Italy and India. A few were used in Italy in 1945.

Valentine OP / Command

Artillery Observation Post and Command Vehicle; extra radios, to give more space inside, the gun was removed and a dummy barrel fitted to the front of the turret. Used by battery commanders and observation post for Archer units.

Valentine CDL

Continuation of Canal Defence Light experiments; conventional turret replaced with one containing a searchlight.

Valentine Scorpion II

Mine flail; turretless vehicle with flail attachment never used operationally.

Valentine AMRA Mk Ib

Armoured Mine Roller Attachment, a few used on the beaches of Normandy during D-Day.

Valentine Snake

Mine exploder; using "Snake" mine-clearing line charge equipment; a few used operationally.

Valentine Bridgelayer

Armoured bridgelaying vehicle; a turretless Mk II fitted with 10 m (34 ft) long by 2.90 m (9 ft 6 in) wide Class 30 (capable of bearing 30 long tons (34 short tons)) scissors bridge. 192 were produced, 25 of them supplied to the USSR. Used in action in Italy, Burma, north-west Europe and Manchuria.

Valentine with 6-pounder anti-tank mounting

Experimental vehicle built by Vickers-Armstrong to examine the possibility of producing a simple tank destroyer by mounting the 6-pounder in its field carriage on the hull in place of the turret. Trials only, 1942 not required since the Valentine could be fitted with a 6-pounder in a turret.

Valentine flame-throwers

Two Valentine tanks were modified to carry flame-throwers and were tested by the Petroleum Warfare Department to determine which system was best for a tank-mounted flame projector. One used a projector pressurised by slow burning cordite charges (designed by the Ministry of Supply) and one designed by AEC with the PWD using a projector operated by compressed hydrogen gas. Both carried the flame-thrower fuel in a trailer and the flame projector was mounted on the hull front. Trials started in 1942 and showed that the gas-operated system was better. From this test installation was developed the Crocodile equipment for the Churchill Crocodile flame-thrower used in the North West Europe campaign in 1944–45.

Valentine 9.75-inch flame mortar

Experimental vehicle with the turret replaced by fixed heavy mortar intended to fire 25 lb TNT incendiary shells to demolish concrete emplacements. Trials only by the Petroleum Warfare Dept, 1943–45. Effective range was 400 yd (370 m) (maximum range 2,000 yd (1,800 m)). Few used in Normandy on D-Day to help clear buildings.

Burmark

"Ark" design using Valentine hull for a light ramp tank to be used in Far East. The end of the war precluded further development.

Gap Jumping Tank

Experiments with rockets late in the war to propel a Valentine tank across an obstacle such as a minefield.

== Gallery ==
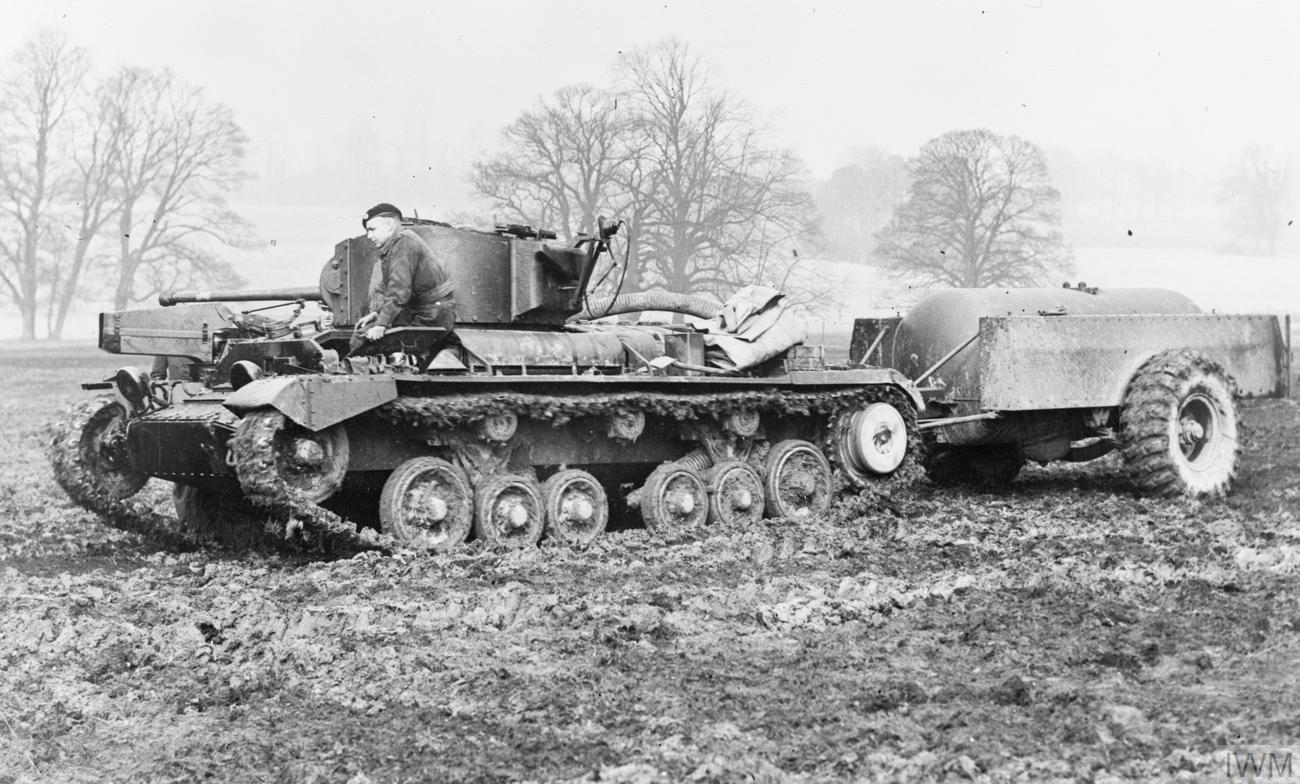
Valentine flame-thrower (gas-operated equipment)

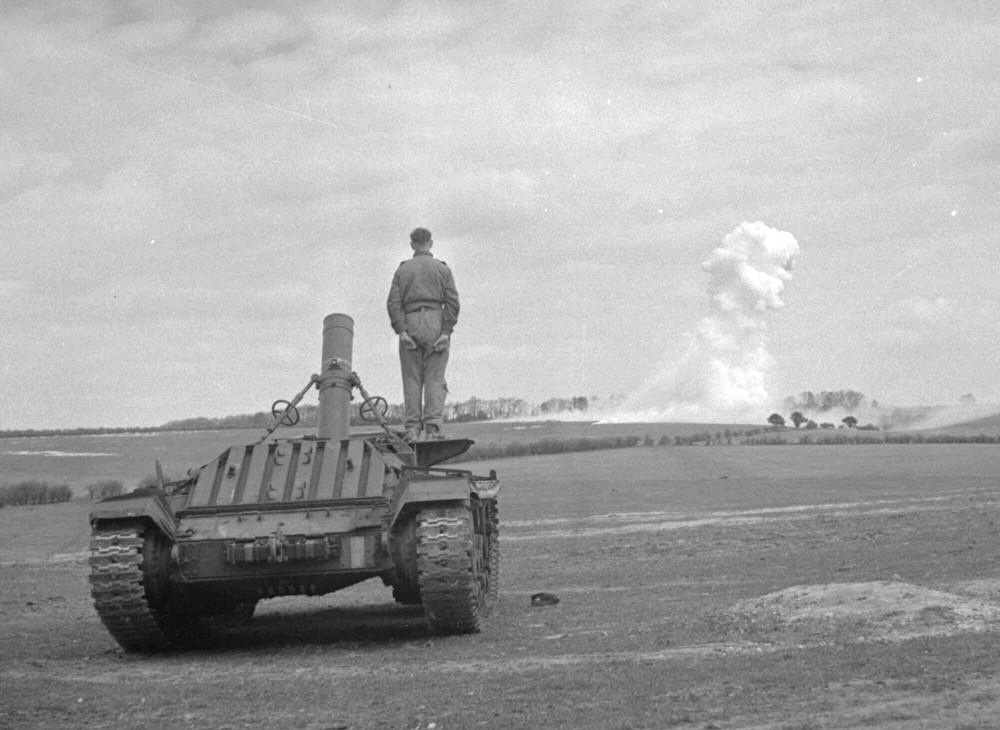
Flame mortar fitted to Valentine tank chassis, firing phosphorus bombs

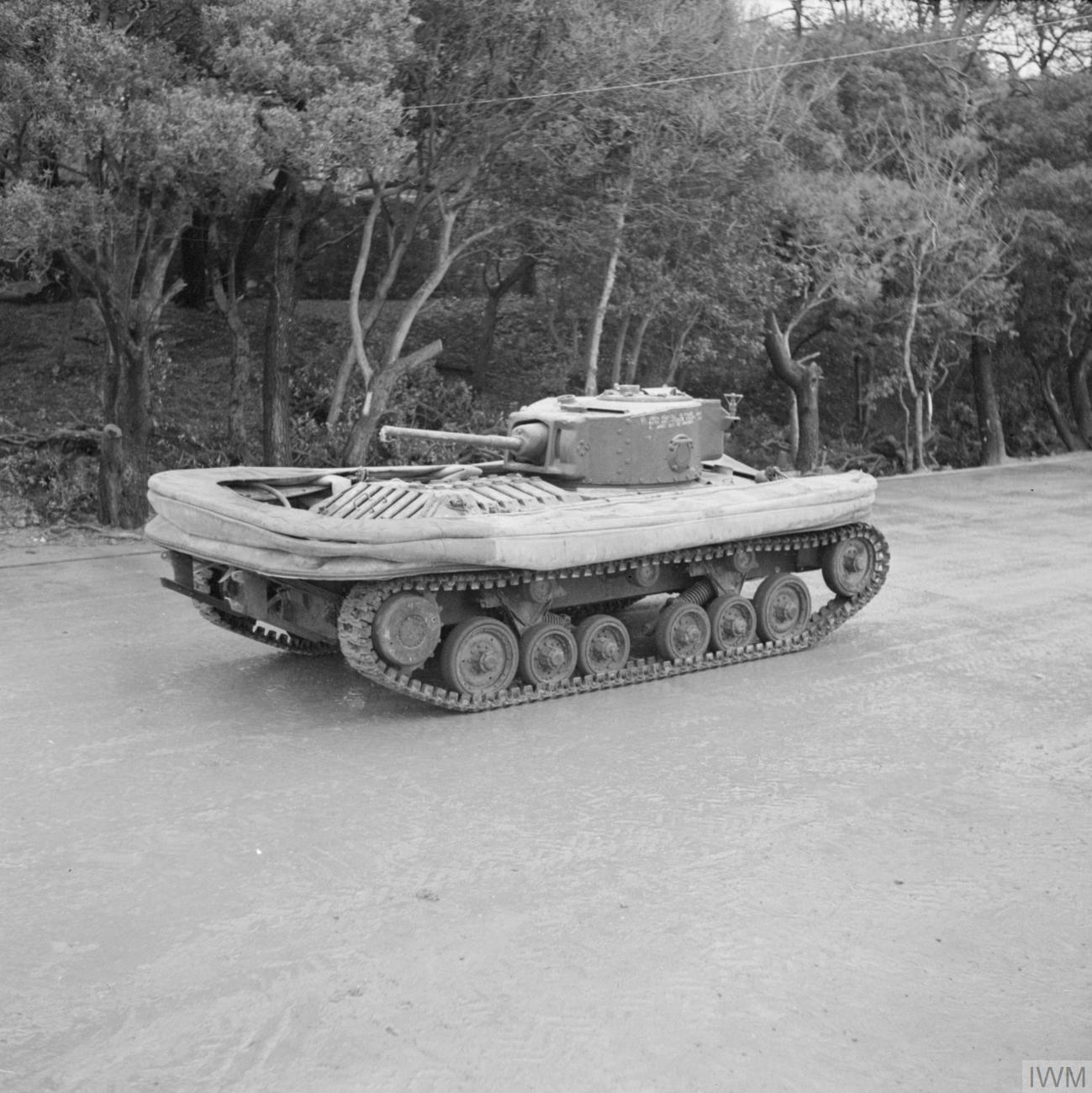
Valentine DD tank with screen lowered, 1944

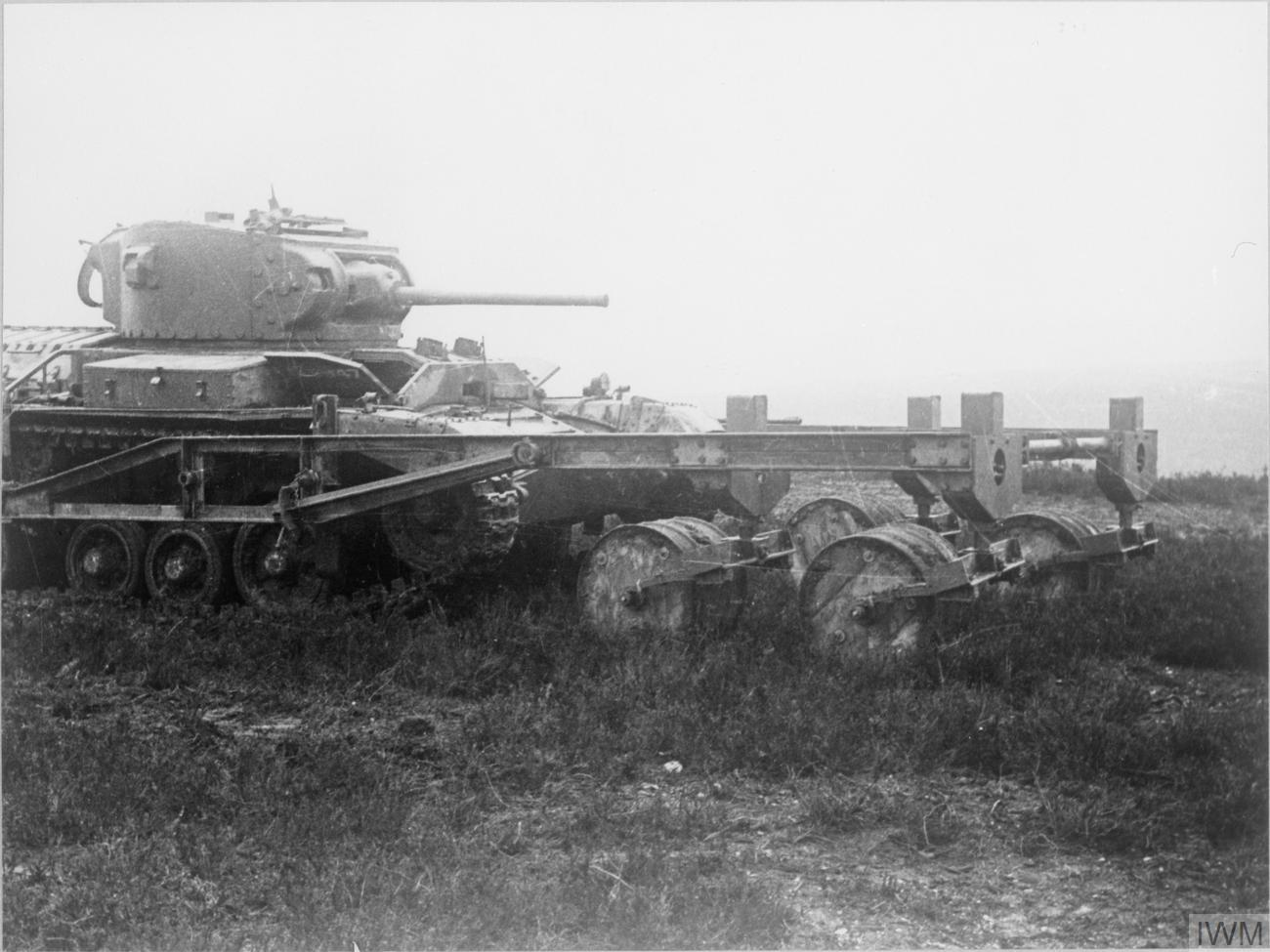
Valentine with AMRA

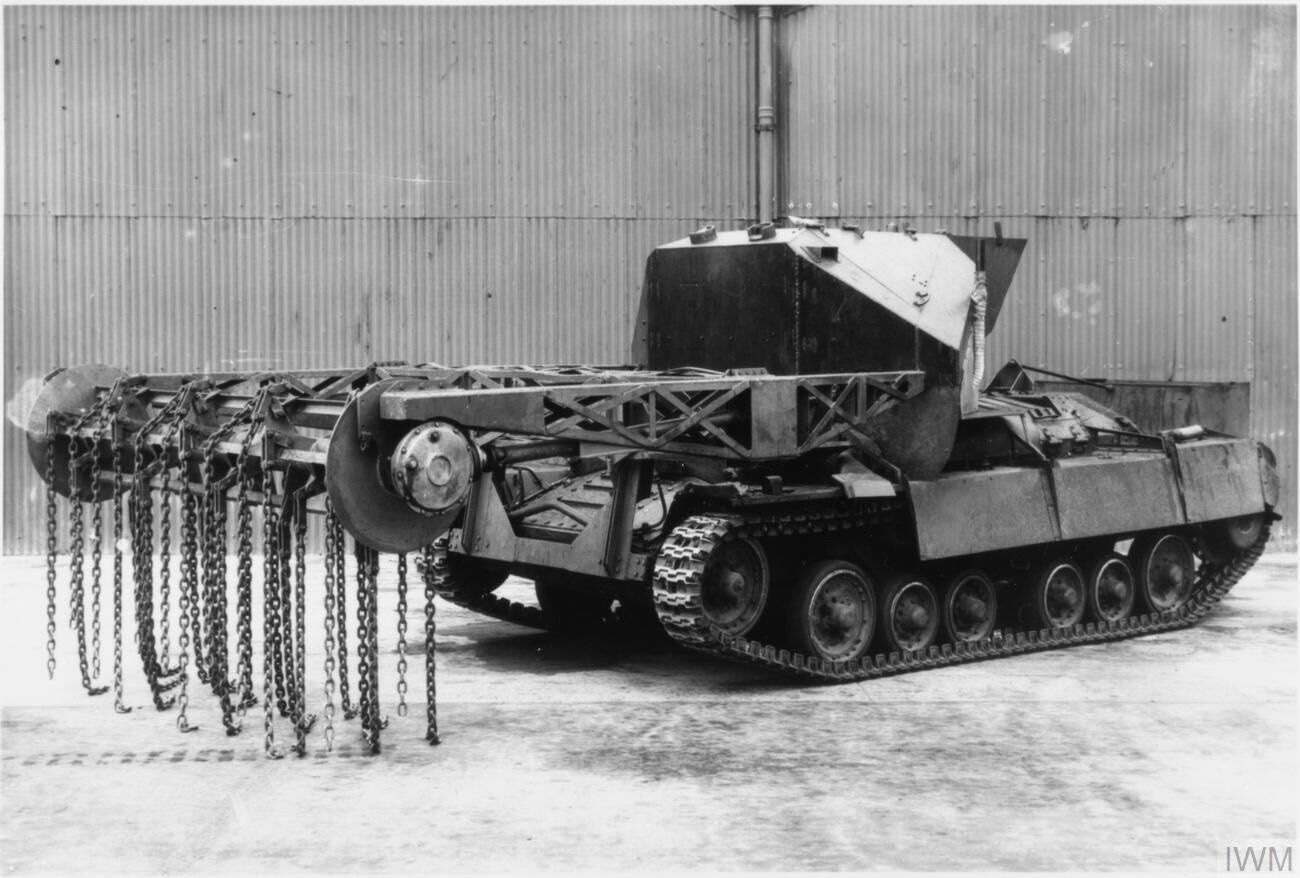
Valentine Scorpion

== Operators ==
Canada

- The Canadian Army received 30 of 1,420 tanks built in Canada. Valentines were used for training.

Czechoslovakia

- Czechoslovak 11th Infantry Battalion repaired two Valentine wrecks in Tobruk.
- 1st Czechoslovak Independent Armoured Brigade Group received Valentines in spring 1943. These tanks were the first ones officially operated by the Czechoslovak exile army in WWII.

Egypt

- Egyptian Army used Valentine tanks after WWII; used in Mandatory Palestine during 1948 Arab–Israeli War, then relegated to training.

Iran

- Imperial Iranian Ground Forces received some ex-Lend Lease tanks from the USSR after WWII.

Nazi Germany

- Captured Valentines were pressed into service with the Afrika Korps and were designated Infanterie Panzerkampfwagen Mk III 749 (e).

New Zealand

- New Zealand received
  - 100 Valentine II
  - 75 Valentine III, 18 converted to Valentine IIICS
  - 81 Valentine V
  - 11 Valentine Bridgelayers

Poland

- Polish 1st Armoured Division and various other units of Polish Armed Forces in the West operated Valentine tanks for training.

Portugal

- The Portuguese Army received 36 Valentine Mk II in 1943, which were used by the Batalhão de Carros (Infantry Tank Battalion).

Romania

- Romanian Army captured four Mk III tanks from the Red Army, which were used for testing and anti-tank training.

(Soviet Union) Red Army received 2,124 British-built and 1,208 Canadian-built Lend-Lease tanks. 270 and 180 lost during transportation.

Turkey

- The Turkish Army received 200 Valentine IIIs between 1941 and 1944.

United Kingdom

== Vehicles based on Valentine chassis ==
- SP 17-pounder, Valentine, Mk I, Archer
- Carrier, Valentine, 25-pounder gun Mk I, Bishop
- Tank, Infantry, Valiant (A38)

== Surviving tanks ==
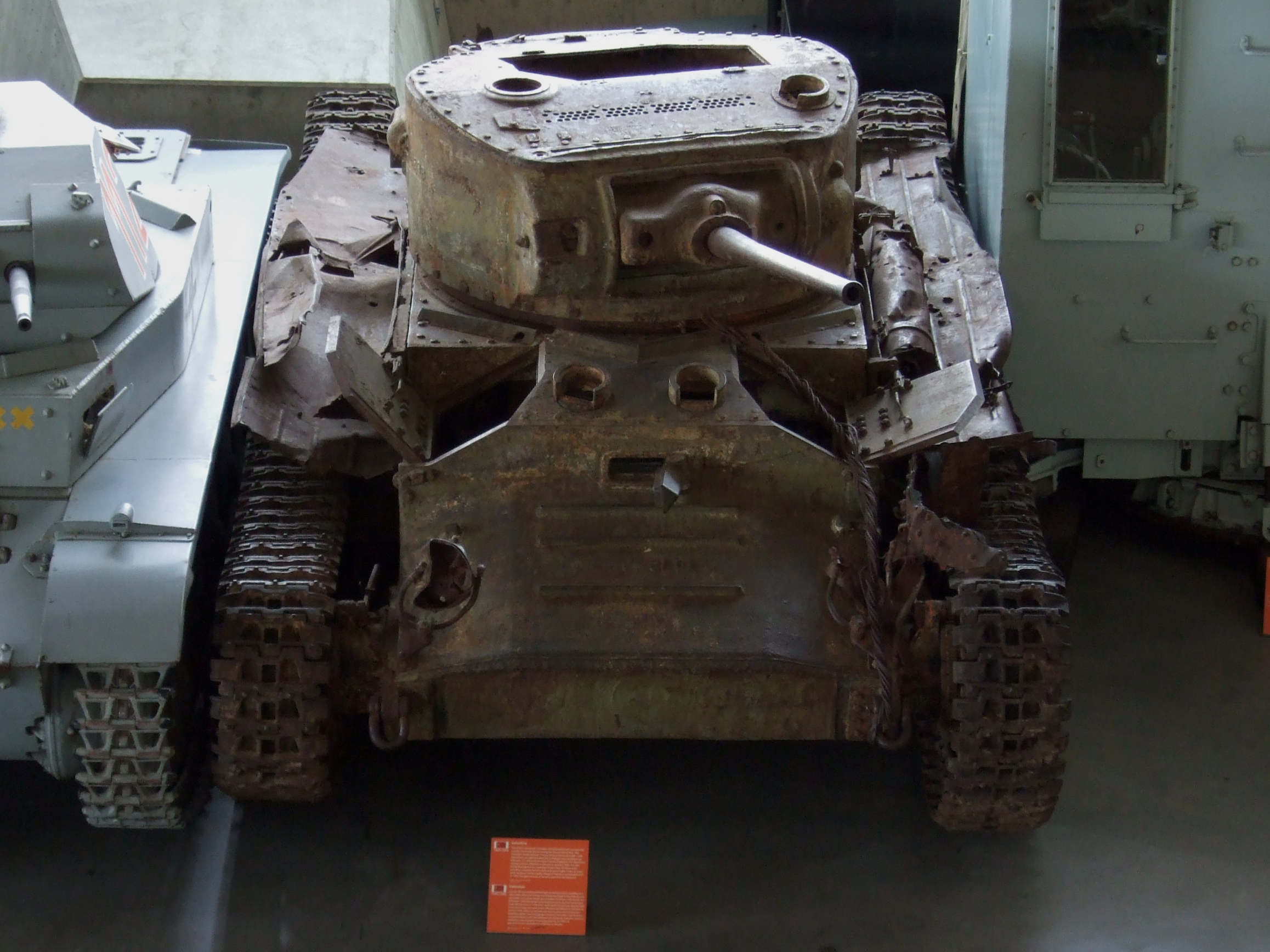
Tank no 838 at the Canadian War Museum

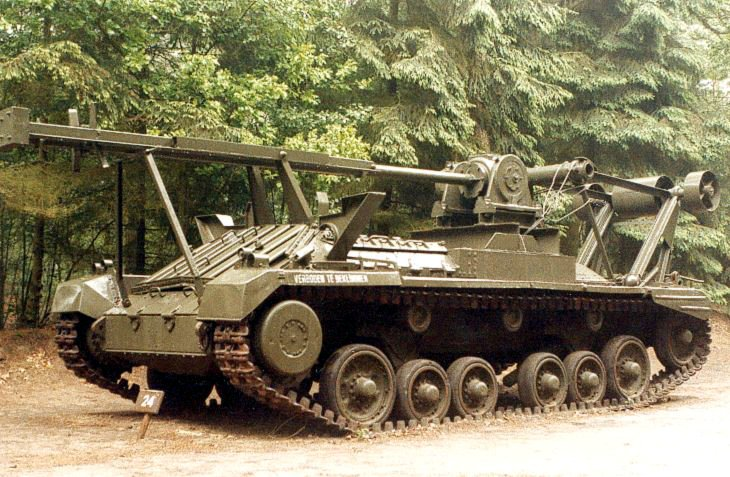
Valentine Bridgelayer (without bridge) Overloon War Museum, 1987

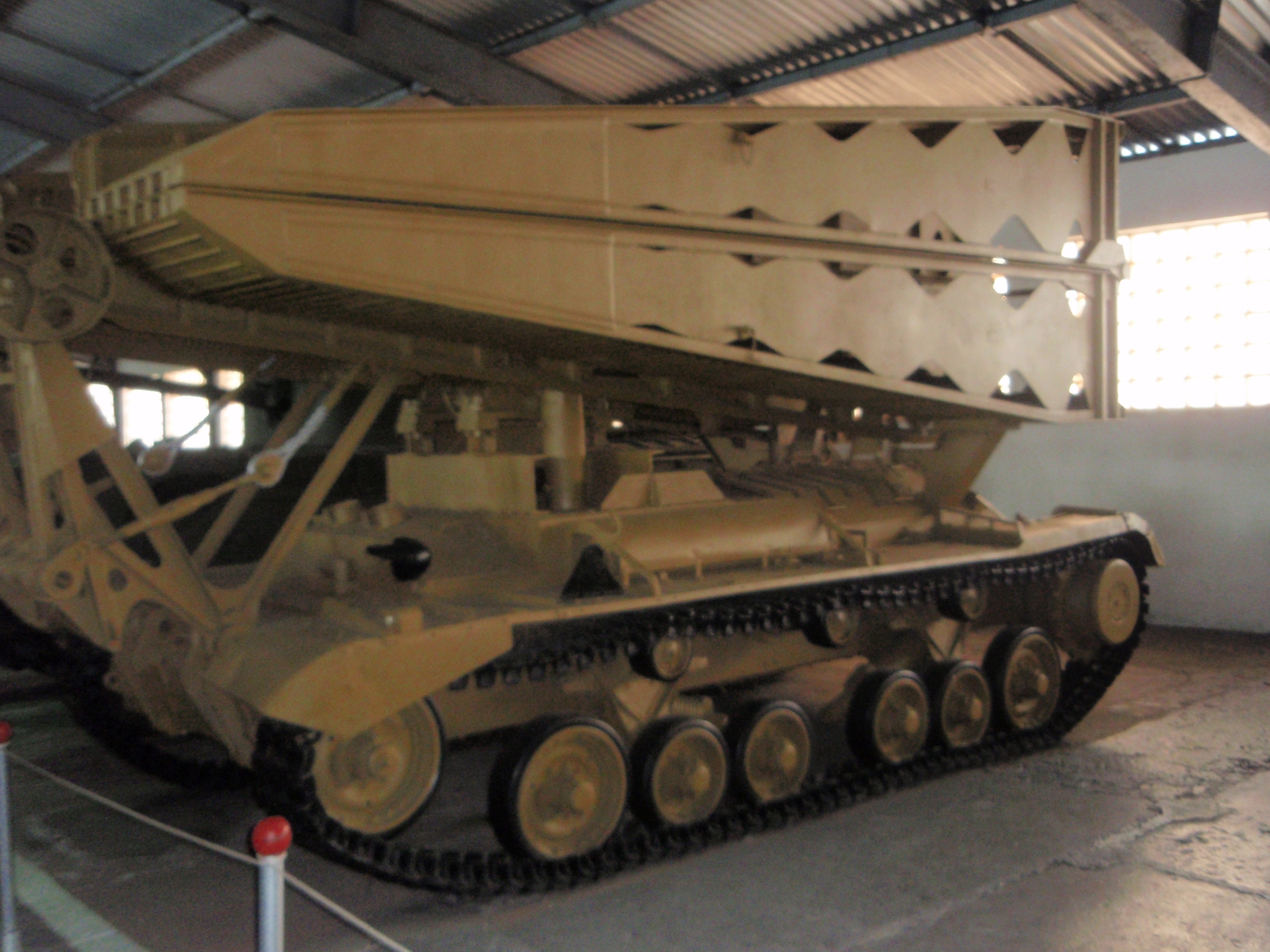
Valentine Bridgelayer, Kubinka Tank Museum, 2009

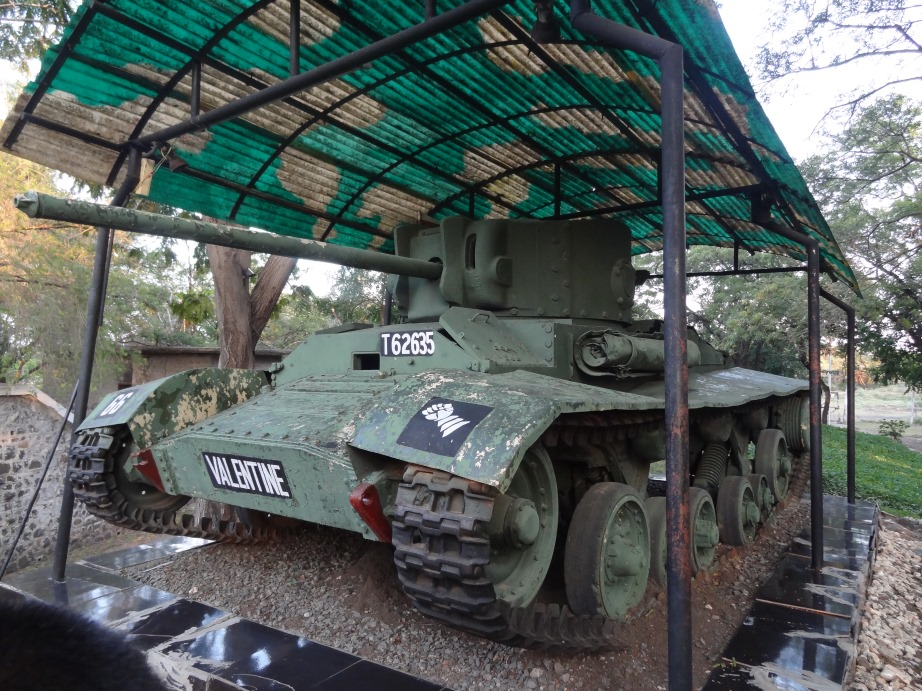
Valentine Cavalry Tank Museum, Ahmednagar, 2014

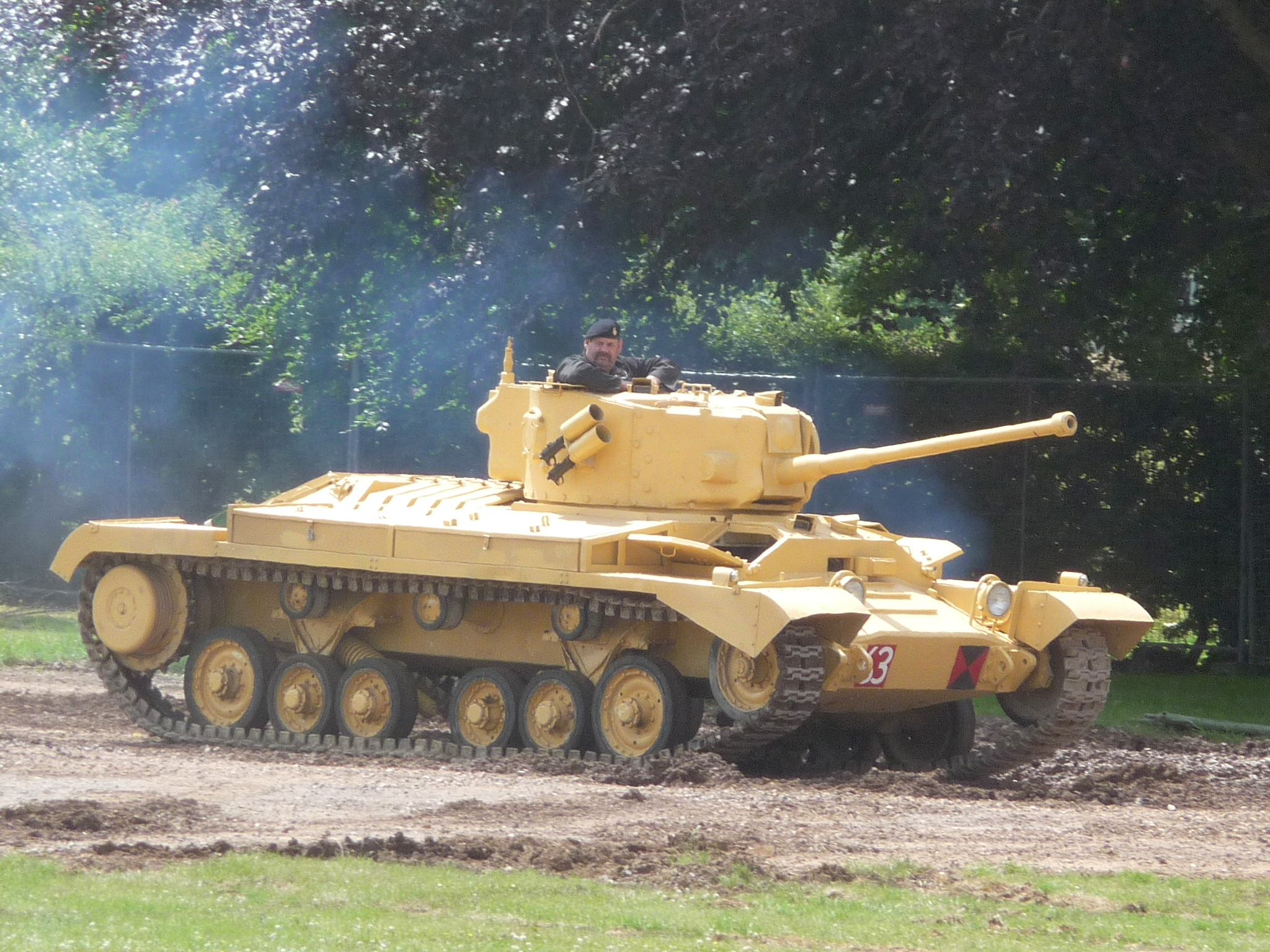
Valentine MK IX at the Bovington Tank museum, 2009

Around forty Valentine tanks and vehicles based on the Valentine chassis survive. Tanks in running condition are at the Bovington Tank Museum (Mark IX) and in private hands in New Zealand and the United Kingdom. The Bovington collection has a Mark II and a Valentine Scissors Bridgelayer. Other examples are displayed at the Imperial War Museum Duxford in the UK; the Royal Military Museum in Brussels, Belgium; the Musée des Blindés, Saumur, France and the Kubinka Tank Museum, Russia; the South African National Museum of Military History. In the United States, the Military Vehicle Technology Foundation and the Virginia Museum of Military Vehicles own Valentines.

The Cavalry Tank Museum Ahmednagar, India have a Valentine Tank and a Valentine Bridgelayer.

A number of Valentine hulls are in private ownership in Australia, including one in the Australian Armour and Artillery Museum. These were sent there after the war for use as agricultural vehicles.

Two Canadian-built Valentines survive. Valentine Tank Mk VIIA, no. 838, built May 1943, was a Lend-Lease tank shipped to the Soviet Union. It fell through the ice of a boggy river near Telepyne, Ukraine (Russian: Telepino), during a Soviet counter-offensive on 25 January 1944. In 1990 a 74-year-old villager helped locate the tank and it was recovered and offered as a Glasnost-era gift to Canada. It was presented to the Canadian War Museum by independent Ukraine in 1992 and stands on display in the LeBreton Gallery. A Valentine built by Canadian Pacific resides at the Base Borden Military Museum in Barrie, Ontario.

A notable survivor is the only intact DD Valentine. This has been restored to running condition and is in the United Kingdom, privately owned by John Pearson. A number of DD Valentines that sank during training lie off the British coast; several have been located and are regularly visited by recreational divers. Two Valentines lie in the Moray Firth in Scotland and two lie 3.5 miles (5.6 km) out of Poole Bay in Dorset. These tanks lie 100 m (110 yd) apart in 15 m (49 ft) of water. A further tank is known to lie in around 10 m (11 yd) of water in Bracklesham Bay, south of Chichester in West Sussex; the hull and turret are clearly recognisable as it sits on a gravel mound.

An individual can be found at the Darwin War Museum.

In October 2012, a Valentine Mk IX tank that fell through ice while crossing a river in western Poland during the Soviet Army's march to Berlin was recovered. This, the only surviving Valentine Mk IX to have actually seen combat, is reportedly well preserved and could possibly be restored to operational condition.

== See also ==
- Vickers Tank Periscope MK.IV
