= Valiant tank =

British assault tank prototype

Tank, Infantry, Valiant (A38)
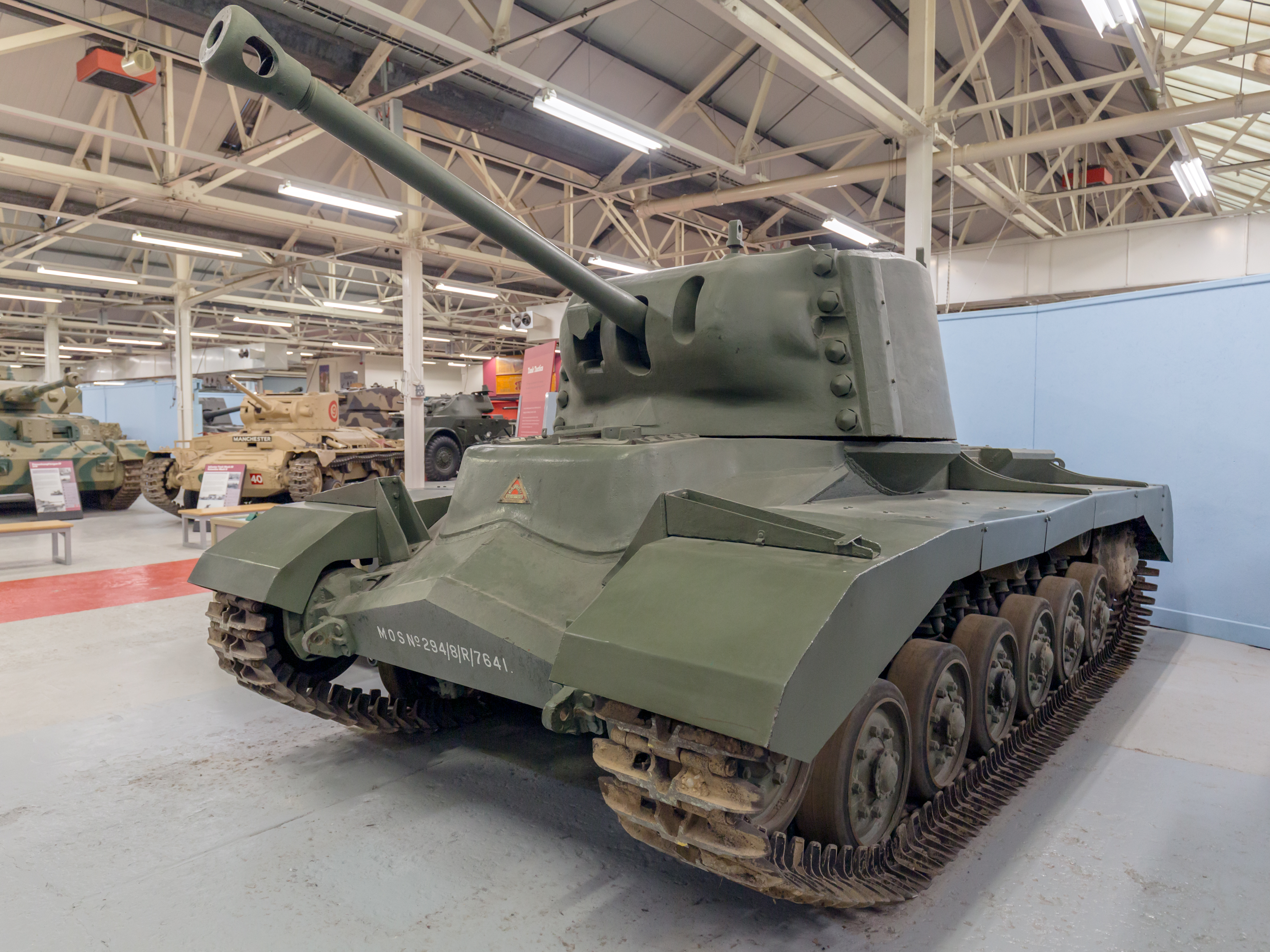
- Tank, Infantry, Valiant (A38) at The Tank Museum, Bovington
- Type: Assault tank{{
- Place of origin: UK

Production history
- Designer: Vickers
- Designed: 1943
- Manufacturer: Ruston & Hornsby
- Produced: 1944
- No. built: 1

Specifications
- Mass: 27 t
- Length: 17 ft 9 in (5.4 m)
- Width: 9 ft 3 in (2.8 m)
- Height: 7 ft (2.1 m)
- Crew: 4
- Armour: 4.5 inch (114 mm) maximum
- Main armament: QF 6 pdr (57 mm) gun
- Secondary armament: 2 x 7.92 mm Besa machine guns
- Engine: GMC 6004 (6-71M) diesel 210 hp (157 kW)
- Transmission: 5 forward gears, 1 reverse
- Suspension: Individual sprung units
- Operational range: 80 miles (130 km)
- Maximum speed: 12 mph (19 km/h) road; 7 mph (11 km/h) off-road

The Tank, Infantry, Valiant (A38) was a British tank design of the Second World War that only reached the prototype stage. It was intended to meet a specification for a well-armoured, light-medium tank, for use against Japanese forces in the South-East Asia theatre. The prototype demonstrated that the design was a failure and this sole example produced was retained by the School of Tank Technology as a lesson to its students.

== Design and development ==
The Valiant, under General Staff specification A38, began as a candidate for an assault tank, with the thickest armour on the lowest possible weight, for use in the Far East. It was to be similar in intention to the 40-ton A33 Excelsior although far lighter. As the Valiant managed the same 114 mm frontal armour with only 27 tons, it managed to achieve its primary goal, but only by making unacceptable compromises elsewhere.{ At a time when British tank design was already at its nadir, this "terrible price for the weight concession"} led to what is probably the worst British tank of the war.

The design brief of December 1943 called for three prototypes of a small, heavily armoured tank for the Far East. Speed across open country was less important, as was performance against armour. Design work started with Vickers, but they soon passed it to Birmingham Railway Carriage & Wagon, it was passed to Rolls Royce Clan Foundry where it was given more armour around the transmission increasing the weight then finally Ruston & Hornsby, who completed the single prototype in 1944. Vickers' original intention may have been to use parts of their Valentine infantry tank where possible, but this did not survive the production choices of the other manufacturers, nor was the running gear of the far lighter Valentine compatible with the needs of such heavy armour. The largest point of commonality was the choice of engine, the 210 bhp (160 kW) General Motors 6004 two-stroke diesel, as used in later marks of Valentine.

Construction was like that of the Matilda infantry tank – large cast armour pieces bolted together. Suspension was by six equally sized wheels on each side, with independent wishbone suspension units for each, rather than bogies. Concern was expressed about the possible fragility of these units in combat, but Valiant was never taken seriously off-road to test them. The drivetrain was to the rear, from a 210 bhp (160 kW) diesel. This low power limited the tank to a predicted top speed of 12 mph (19 km/h), although this was still acceptable for an infantry tank or assault tank.

Following from the later Valentine VIII and XI models, the turret was to accept either the QF 6 pounder or the QF 75 mm, with space for a turret crew of three (commander, gunner, loader). This was achieved at the cost of a large heavy turret with near-vertical faces and a massive cast front face with distinctively prominent bolts. The mantlet was internal and a weak point against accurate fire at close range. Unlike the late model Valentines it had a co-axial machine-gun.

The Valiant's suspension was tested by the Fighting Vehicle Proving Establishment (FVPE) at Chertsey in May 1945. The first day gave minor problems and was abandoned after only 13 miles (21 km) of easy on-road driving. However, the driver was already exhausted by this time, finding that the steering levers needed his full weight to operate and that the seat, footbrake and gear lever all carried risk of physical injury in using them. The Officer in Charge decided to abandon the trials there and then as it was impossible and unsafe to continue, reporting that "in his view the entire project should be closed". There were also issues with weight distribution and the ground clearance of only 9 inches (23 cm), and by that point of the war there was no longer a need for the tank. The Valiant project was terminated.

== Variants ==
A Valiant II was mentioned in late 1943, but little more was heard of it. In February 1944 there was more detailed discussion of a "Heavy Valiant", which may have been the same and has been reported as such in some sources.

The Heavy Valiant was a substantially different vehicle, only using the turret and driver's compartment of the Valiant on a hull derived from the A33 Excelsior and its T1 suspension. This gave armour of 9 inches (230 mm) on the hull front and 10 inches (250 mm) on the turret. Weight was now estimated at 42 tons, which is comparable with the original Excelsior despite almost doubling the armour thickness, and so this must have been a much smaller tank. Power was doubled to cope with the weight, using the new and compact 400 bhp (300 kW) Rolls-Royce Meteorite engine (a cut-down V8 Meteor) and an improved transmission. The mistake of the Valentine was to be repeated, where the turret was up-gunned to the 95 mm howitzer of the Centaur IV at the cost of forcing the commander to take over the loader's task in a two-man turret. There is a record of a prototype having gone to the ranges at Lulworth Cove for trials in January 1945, but no other record of what it looked like.

== Present day ==
The sole Valiant was retained by the School of Tank Technology, where students were treated to an inspection of it at the end of their course and invited to find fault. David Fletcher wrote of this: "One hopes they started early in the morning."

The Valiant can now be seen at The Tank Museum.
