= The Tank Museum =

Military museum in Dorset, England

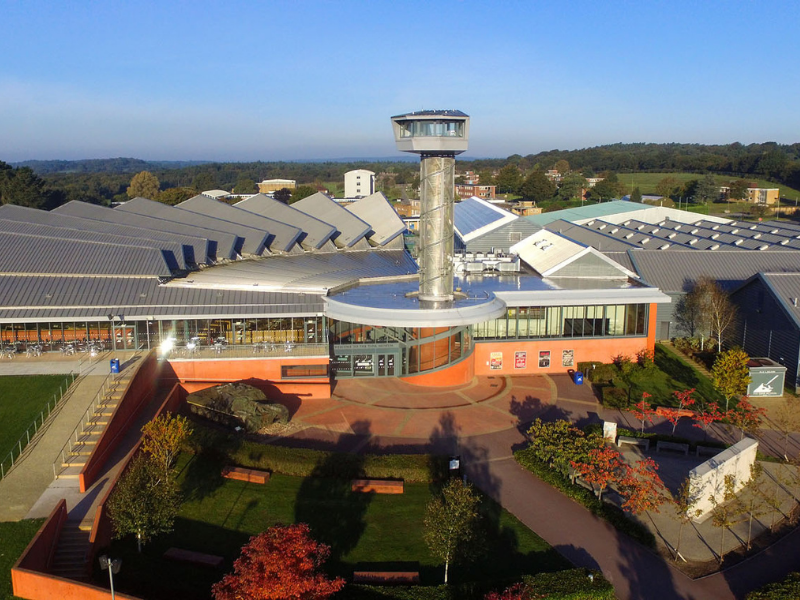
- The Tank Museum

- Location of the Tank Museum within Dorset
- Established: 1947
- Location: Bovington, Dorset; England
- Coordinates: 50.695194°N 2.243611°W
- Type: Military Museum
- Visitors: 219,792 (2025)
- Public transit access: Wool railway station
- Website: www.tankmuseum.org

The Tank Museum (previously the Bovington Tank Museum) is a collection of armoured fighting vehicles at Bovington Camp in Dorset, South West England. It is about 1 mile (1.6 km) north of the village of Wool and 12 miles (19 km) west of the major port of Poole. The collection traces the history of the tank with almost 300 vehicles on display. It includes Tiger 131, one of the two surviving Tiger I tanks in operable condition, and a British First World War Mark I, the world's oldest surviving combat tank. It is the museum of the Royal Tank Regiment and the Royal Armoured Corps and is a registered charity.

== History ==
The writer Rudyard Kipling visited Bovington in 1923 and, after viewing the damaged tanks that had been salvaged at the end of the First World War, recommended that a museum be set up. A shed was established to house the collection but was not opened to the general public until 1947.

George Forty, who was appointed director of the museum in 1982, expanded and modernized the collection. He retired in 1993 after which he was appointed an OBE. David Fletcher, who had been a historian at the museum since 1982, retired in 2012 and was also appointed an MBE "for his services to the history of armoured warfare". In 1985 the museum loaned a Sherman tank to the Great Dorset Steam Fair to be used in a heavy haulage demonstration.

The museum established its own YouTube channel in January 2010. Early episodes were largely one-take affairs of museum staff talking about specific tanks in the collection and their role in history, with notable series led by Fletcher called "Tank Chats." The channel has more YouTube subscribers than famous museums such as the Metropolitan Museum of Art, and the Louvre; and has gained over 100 million views across its videos by April 2023, the first museum channel to hit such a milestone. In December 2023 the museum hosted a long distance footrace involving multiple laps around the museum.

During the Russo-Ukrainian War the tank museum was able to provide blueprints and track samples of Soviet equipment allowing Cook Defence Systems to manufacture track for use by Ukraine.

== Exhibition halls ==
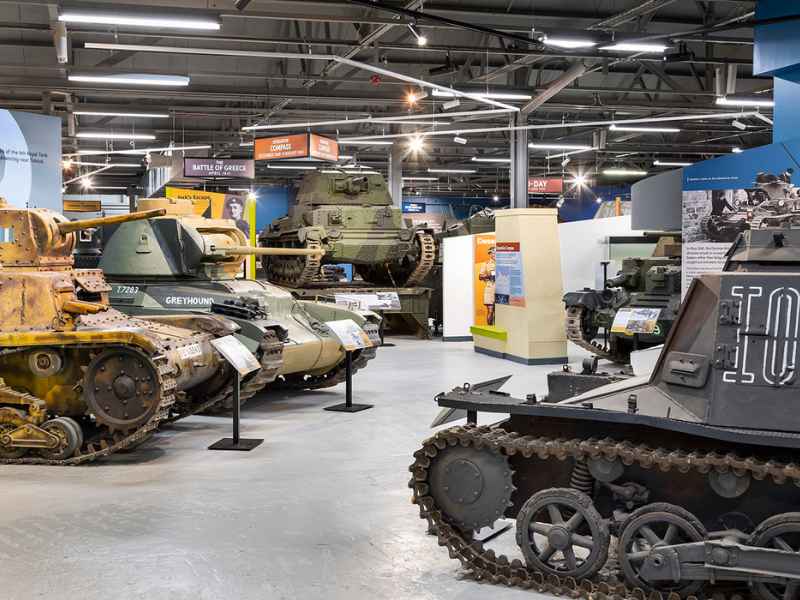
WW2 Story Hall

=== World War I Hall (Tank Men) ===
As well as containing the majority of the museum's World War I tanks the hall tells the story of the men who crewed the first tanks between 1916 and 1918.

- Featured tanks: Mark I tank, IV, V (one of the few World War I tanks still in working order), IX & Mark VIII "Liberty" tanks.

=== Inter War Hall (War Horse to Horsepower) ===
This hall explores the rise of the tank and the role of the cavalry on the Western Front.

- Featured vehicles: Vickers A1E1 Independent, Peerless armoured car & Vickers Light tank, Mark II.

=== World War II Hall ===
This hall displays the largest section, with military vehicles from most nations involved in that conflict.

- Featured vehicles: Panzer I, III, IV, Stug III, Tiger II, Jagdpanzer 38(t), Jagdpanther, Jagdtiger, Sd.Kfz. 251, Somua S35, Comet I, Matilda Mk I, A38 Valiant, Ram Cruiser Mk II, M24 Chaffee, M4 Sherman, 17pdr SP Achilles, M48 Patton, M26 Pershing, T17E1 Staghound, Hamilcar glider, DUKW, SU-76, T-26, L3/33 LF, M13/40, Tortoise, Black Prince.

=== Battlegroup Afghanistan ===
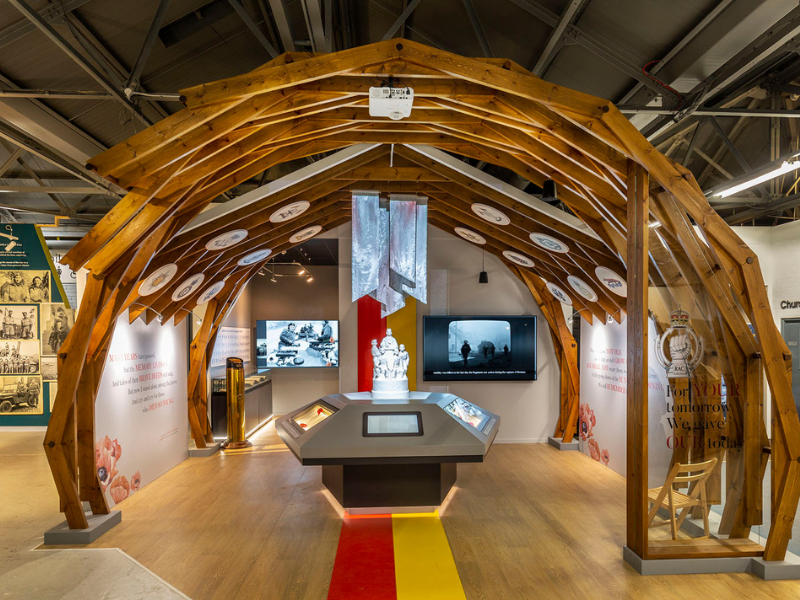
RAC Memorial Room

This hall contains the Battlegroup Afghanistan exhibition. The men of the Royal Armoured Corps were involved in some of the fiercest fighting since the Second World War.

- Featured tanks: Conqueror, Chieftain, Challenger 1 and TOG II.

=== Cold War Hall ===
Collection of vehicles from the Cold and Gulf War.

- Featured Tanks: Tog II, Chieftain, Centurion.

=== Tanks For the Memories - Tanks in Popular Culture Exhibition ===
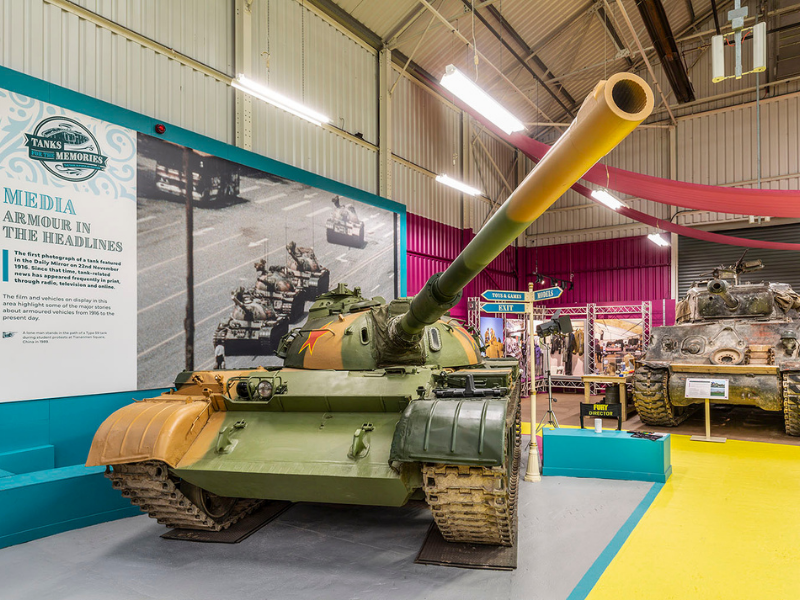
Tanks in Popular Culture Exhibition, featuring a Type 59 Chinese tank, known from Tiananmen Square, with a picture of the Tankman behind it

New for 2023, “Tanks for the Memories: The Tank in Popular Culture”, was created for the 100th anniversary of the Tank Museum. It is an exhibition looking at how the tank has become a cultural icon through the manufacture of multiple toys, games, models, and the production of works of art, books, comics, video games and films.

- Featured tanks: Mark IV.

=== The Tank Story Hall ===
This hall holds some of the most important tanks and AFVs in history, with a supporting collection housed in a multimedia exhibition. It follows the story of the tank, from its invention in 1915 through the 20th century and into the future:

- Featured tanks: Little Willie (the forerunner of British tanks), Whippet, Renault FT, Char B1, Panzer II, Tiger 131 (a Tiger I captured in Tunisia in April 1943 and fully restored to running condition by the workshops at Bovington, this is one of two Tiger Is left that is capable of running under its own power; it was used in the film Fury), M3 Grant, T-34, Panther, DD Sherman, Churchill Crocodile, Sherman Firefly, M48 Patton, T-72, T-62 and Challenger 2.

=== Royal Armoured Corps Memorial Room ===
The Memorial Room was created in partnership with the Royal Armoured Corps Memorial Trust and commemorates the sacrifice of almost 13,000 Royal Armoured Corps soldiers who died in service since the Corps was founded in 1939. The Memorial Room houses the Books of Remembrance, a digitised and searchable version of the Roll of Honour, and videos about those who fought in the RAC.

=== The Vehicle Conservation Centre ===
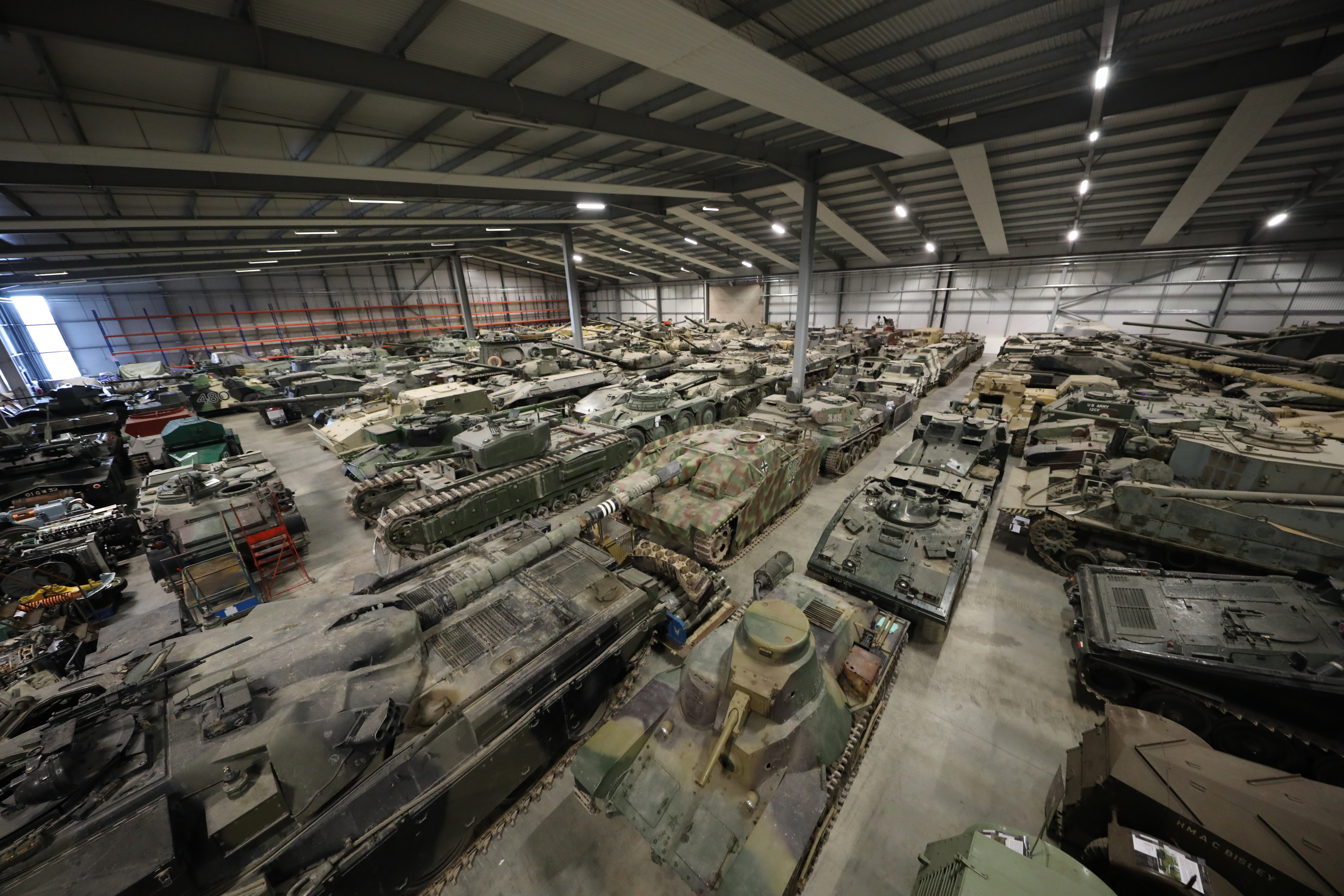
The interior of the Vehicle Conservation Centre

The Vehicle Conservation Centre provides cover for more of the collection and puts on view vehicles that had previously not been seen by the public:

- Featured tanks: Charioteer, M41 Bulldog, M103, M60 Patton, T-54, Cold War and Iraqi T-55s, BMP-1, AMX-30, Type 69, Infanterikanonvagn 91, A33 Excelsior, T14 and SU-100.

== Film ==
The museum's collection includes Tiger 131, one of two surviving Tiger I tanks in operable condition, and the replica Mark IV tank built for the film War Horse.

== See also ==
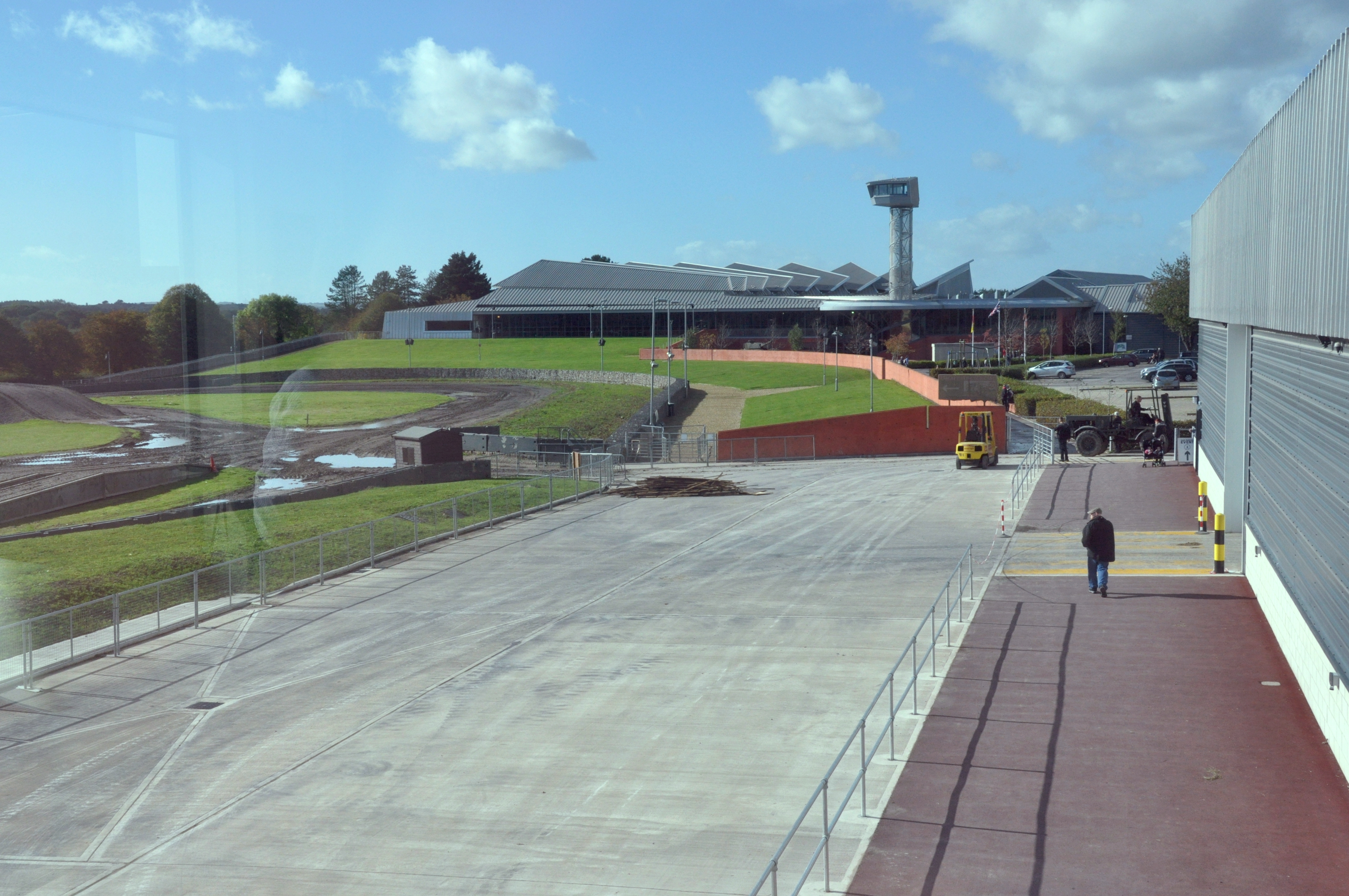
A view of the Tank Museum from the Vehicle Conservation Center, with the display arena used by Tankfest to the left

Tank museums

- Norfolk Tank Museum – United Kingdom
- Kubinka Tank Museum – Russia
- Musée des Blindés – France
- Military Museum Lešany – Czech Republic
- Deutsches Panzermuseum – Germany
- Yad La-Shiryon – Latrun, Israel
- Parola Tank Museum – Finland
- Australian Armour and Artillery Museum – Australia
- Nationaal Militair Museum – Soesterberg, The Netherlands
- Ontario Regiment Museum – Ontario, Canada
- Royal Tank Museum – Amman, Jordan
- American Heritage Museum – Massachusetts, United States

Other

- U.S. Army Armor and Cavalry Collection – Fort Moore, GA
- United States Army Ordnance Museum – Virginia, US
- Polish Army Museum – Large collection of Soviet, Western and Polish AFVs
- Heartland Museum of Military Vehicles – Nebraska, US
- Base Borden Military Museum - Ontario, Canada
- National Museum of Military Vehicles – Dubois, WY
- Lists of armoured fighting vehicles
- Tank classification
