= T14 heavy tank =

American prototype heavy tank of World War II

Assault tank T14
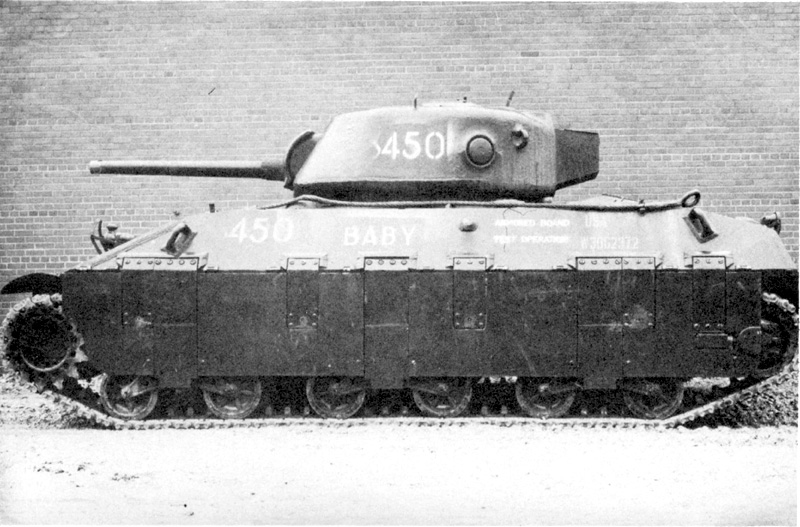
- Assault Tank T14
- Type: Heavy tank
- Place of origin: United States

Production history
- Manufacturer: American Locomotive Company
- No. built: 2

Specifications
- Mass: 42.6 tons
- Length: 6.19 m (20 ft 4 in)
- Width: 3.17 m (10 ft 5 in)
- Height: 2.99 m (9 ft 10 in)
- Crew: 5 (Commander, gunner, loader, driver, co-driver)
- Armor: 133 mm (5.2 in)
- Main armament: 75 mm M3 Gun; 50 rounds
- Secondary armament: .50 inch (12.7 mm) M2 Browning machine gun 2x .30 (7.62 mm) M1919 Browning machine gun 9,000 rounds
- Engine: Ford GAA V8; 520 hp (390 kW)
- Power/weight: 12.86 hp/ton
- Suspension: Vertical volute spring suspension (VVSS)
- Operational range: 100 mi (161 km) radius of action
- Maximum speed: 28 km/h (17 mph)

The assault tank T14 was a joint project between the United States and the United Kingdom with the goal being to produce a universal infantry tank.

The T14 project never came to fruition, as a pilot model was not delivered to the UK until 1944 by which time the British Churchill tank had been in service for two years and greatly improved over its initial model. US efforts working on a similarly well-armored tank but with a higher speed for use other than in infantry support led to the T20 Medium Tank.

== Design and development ==
In 1941, the head of the United States Ordnance Department travelled to Britain to learn of their experience, ideas and requirements for the future. Among the discussion was the possibility of designing a well-armed and armored combat vehicle, one that was stronger than the British Churchill infantry tank then in production.

The tank design would have a British QF 6-pounder (57 mm) or a US 75 mm gun and share many parts with the M4 Sherman; they had the same armor thickness, but with sloped armor at extreme angles, effective armor on the T14 was slightly increased to 101 mm (4.0 in).

The British initially ordered 8,500 in 1942 following which detail design work started. Testing of the pilot model which was completed in 1944 showed the vehicle to be much too heavy for practical use. By this time, the British Army was satisfied with the Churchill and its cruiser tank designs and further production of the T14 was halted.

Only two were built; one tested in the US and the other sent to Britain. The example sent to Britain survives in The Tank Museum, Bovington. The British had developed the Heavy Assault Tank A33 "Excelsior" design to the same specification as the T14 but this did not go into service either.

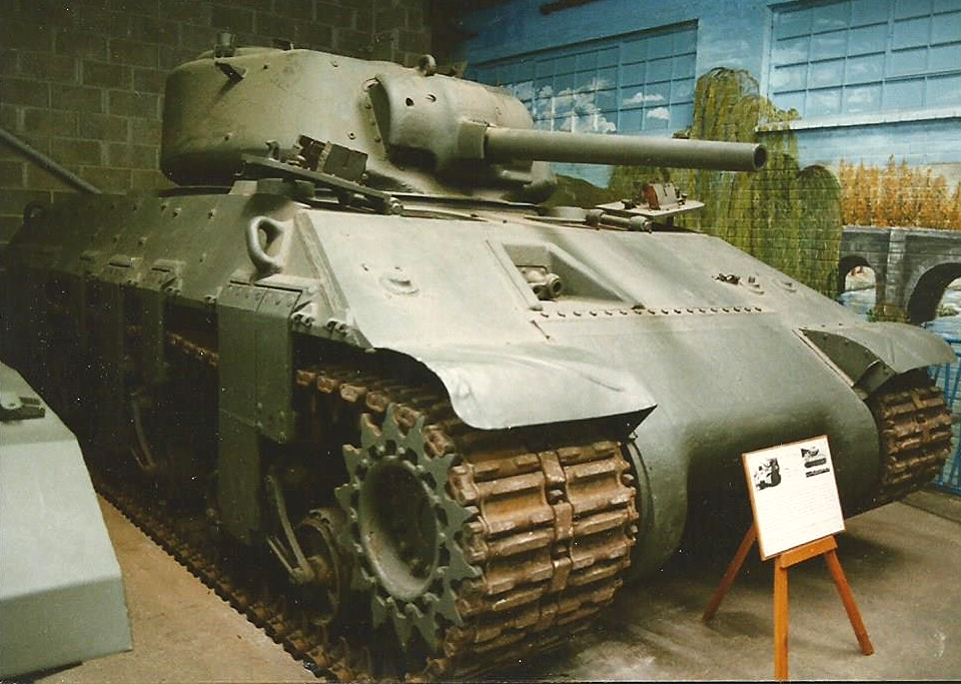
T14 tank at The Tank Museum in Bovington

== See also ==
- List of U.S. military vehicles by model number
- Tank classification

=== Tanks of comparable role, performance and era ===
- British Excelsior - two prototypes built; did not enter service
- British Churchill - heavy tank, entered service 1941
- Soviet KV-1 - heavy tank, entered service in 1939
- American M6 - heavy tank, saw trials but never entered service
