= David Fletcher (military historian) =

British military historian (born 1942)

David Fletcher MBE FRSL
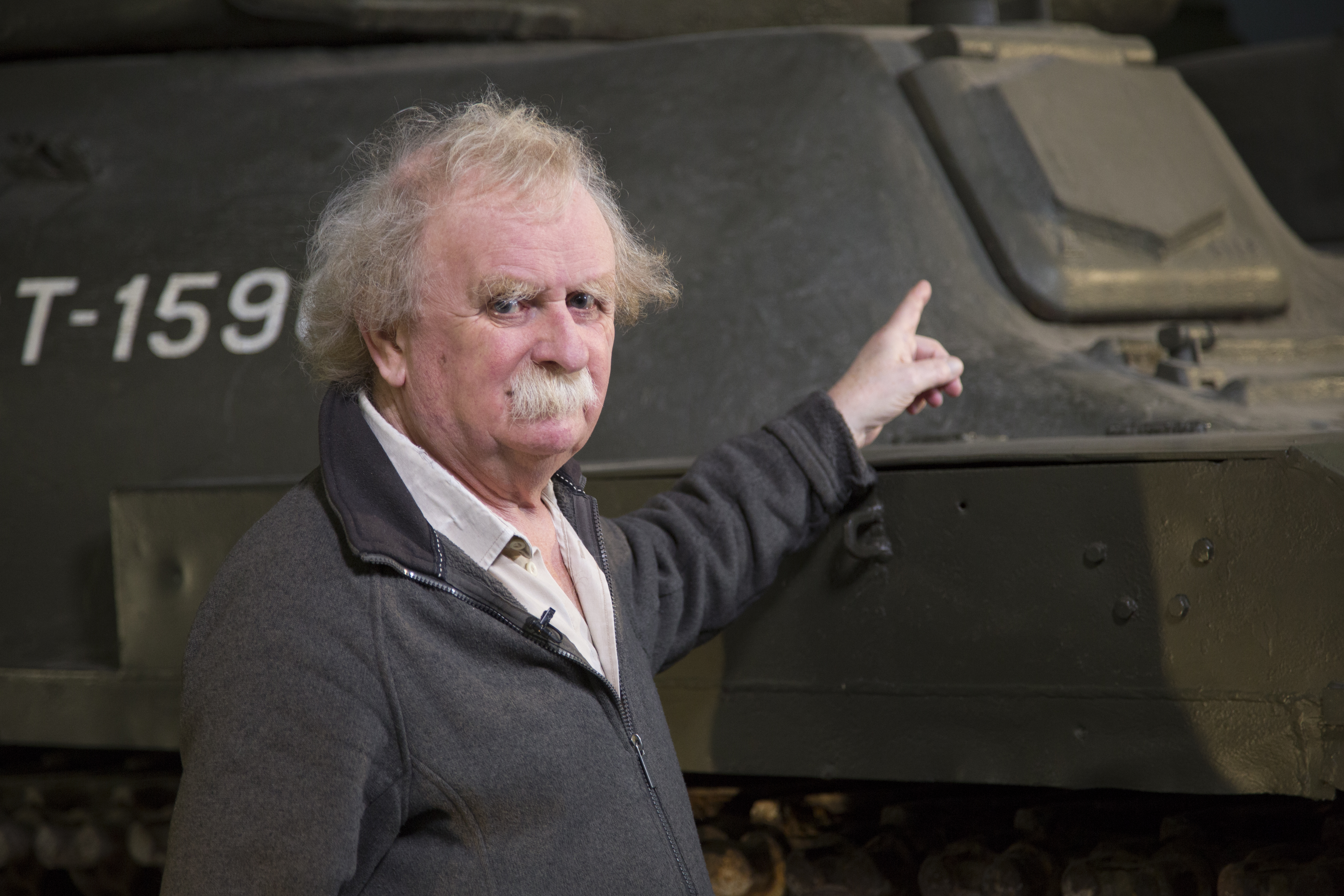
- Fletcher in 2019
- Born: David John Fletcher; 1942 (age 83–84); Petts Wood, London, England
- Occupations: Author; historian

David John Fletcher MBE (born 1942) is an English author and military historian specialising in the history of armoured warfare, particularly that of the United Kingdom.

He was an employee of The Tank Museum, Bovington from 1982 until December 2012, becoming the museum's longest serving member of staff. Earlier that year, he was a panellist on Operation Think Tank, an international symposium on tanks, held in California. He also presents contemporary media such as YouTube for the Tank Museum. Until 2023, David Fletcher hosted a regular video series on The Tank Museum's YouTube channel called 'Tank Chats', in which he gave viewers a brief insight in to a specific tank in the Museum's collection.

In his final year at Bovington, he was appointed an MBE in the Queens New Year's honours list for services to the history of armoured warfare.

== Bibliography ==
His publication list is extensive, including 30 books.

- Fletcher, David (1983). Cromwell Tank: Vehicle History and Specifications. The Tank Museum. HMSO. ISBN 0-11-290403-3.
- — (1983) [1944]. Churchill Tank (Reprint of original WW2 operating manuals ed.). HMSO / Bovington Tank Museum. ISBN 0-11-290404-1.
- — (1984). Landships: British Tanks in the First World War. HMSO. ISBN 0-11-290409-2.
- — (1987). War Cars: British Armoured Cars in the First World War. HMSO. ISBN 0-11-290439-4.
- — (1989a). The Great Tank Scandal: British Armour in the Second World War - Part 1. HMSO. ISBN 978-0-11-290460-1.
- — (1989b). Universal Tank: British Armour in the Second World War - Part 2. HMSO. ISBN 0-11-290534-X.
- — (1990). Staff Cars. Shire Album 245. Shire Publications. ISBN 0747800588.
- — (1990). Moving the Guns: The Mechanisation of the Royal Artillery 1854–1939. HMSO. ISBN 0-11-290477-7.
- — (1991). Mechanised Force. HMSO, for REME Museum. ISBN 0-11-290487-4.
- — (1991). Army Transport, 1939–45. Data Book of Wheeled Vehicles. HMSO, for The Tank Museum. ISBN 0112905064.
- Fletcher, David; MacPhail, Doug (1990). Harvard!: the North American trainers in Canada. San Josef, B.C.: DCF Flying Books. ISBN 0969382502. OCLC 21447685.
- Fletcher, David (1994). Matilda Infantry Tank 1938–45. New Vanguard 8. illustrated by Peter Sarson. Oxford: Osprey Publishing. ISBN 1-85532-457-1.
- Fletcher, David (1995). Crusader and Covenanter Cruiser tanks 1939–45. New Vanguard 14. illustrated by Peter Sarson. Oxford: Osprey Publishing. ISBN 1-85532-512-8.
- — (1998). Tanks in Camera: The Western Desert, 1940–43. Sutton Publishing. ISBN 0750915684.
- — (1998). British Military Transport: 1829–1956. HMSO, for The Tank Museum. ISBN 0-11-290570-6.
- — (1999). Mr. Churchill's Tank: The British Infantry Tank Mark IV. Schiffer Publishing. ISBN 0764306790.
- — (2000). Cruiser Tank Mark VIII A27M Cromwell Mark IV. Museum Ordnance Special. Vol. 25.
- — (2001). The British Tanks, 1915–1919. Crowood Press. ISBN 1-86126-400-3.
- — (2004). British Mark I Tank, 1916. New Vanguard. Vol. 100. Oxford: Osprey Publishing. ISBN 1-841-76689-5. OCLC 56394336.
- Fletcher, David; Harley, Richard C. (2004). Cromwell Cruiser tank 1942–50. New Vanguard 104. illustrated by Peter Sarson. Oxford: Osprey Publishing. ISBN 1-841-76814-6. OCLC 56539945.
- — (2005). Universal Carrier 1936–48: the 'Bren Gun Carrier' Story. New Vanguard 110. Oxford: Osprey Publishing. ISBN 1-841-76813-8. OCLC 58454936.
- — (2006). Swimming Shermans: Sherman DD amphibious tank of World War II. New Vanguard 123. Oxford: Osprey Publishing. ISBN 1-841-76983-5. OCLC 64097835.
- — (2007). Churchill Crocodile Flamethrower. New Vanguard 136. Oxford: Osprey Publishing.
- — (2007). British Mark IV tank. Osprey. ISBN 978-1-846-03082-6. OCLC 77013118.
- Fletcher, David (2008). Sherman Firefly. New Vanguard 141. illustrated by Tony Bryan. Oxford: Osprey Publishing. ISBN 978-1846032776.
- — (2011). Tiger Tank. Owners' Workshop Manual. Haynes. ISBN 978-1844259311.
- Fletcher, David (2011). Mark V tank. New Vanguard 178. illustrated by Henry Morshead. Oxford: Osprey Publishing. ISBN 978-1849083515.
- Tait, Janice; Fletcher, David (2011). Tracing Your Tank Ancestors. Pen & Sword Books. ISBN 978-1848842649.
- — (2012). The Rolls-Royce Armoured Car. New Vanguard 189. Oxford: Osprey Publishing. ISBN 9781849085809.
- — (2013). Great War Tank: Mark IV. Owners' Workshop Manual. Sparkford: Haynes. ISBN 978-0857332424.
- — (2014). British Light Tanks 1927–45 Marks I-VI. New Vanguard 217. Oxford: Osprey Publishing. ISBN 9781782003779.
- — (2016). British Battle Tanks: World War I to 1939. Osprey Publishing. ISBN 9781472817556.
- — (2017). British Battle Tanks: British-made tanks of World War II. Osprey Publishing. ISBN 978-1472820037.
- — (2017). Rolls Royce Armoured Car 1915 To 1944: Owner's Workshop Manual. Haynes Publishing Group. ISBN 978-1785210587.
- — (2019). Churchill Infantry Tank. New Vanguard 272. illustrated by Henry Morshead. Oxford: Osprey Publishing. ISBN 9781472837349.
