= Royal Ordnance L7 =

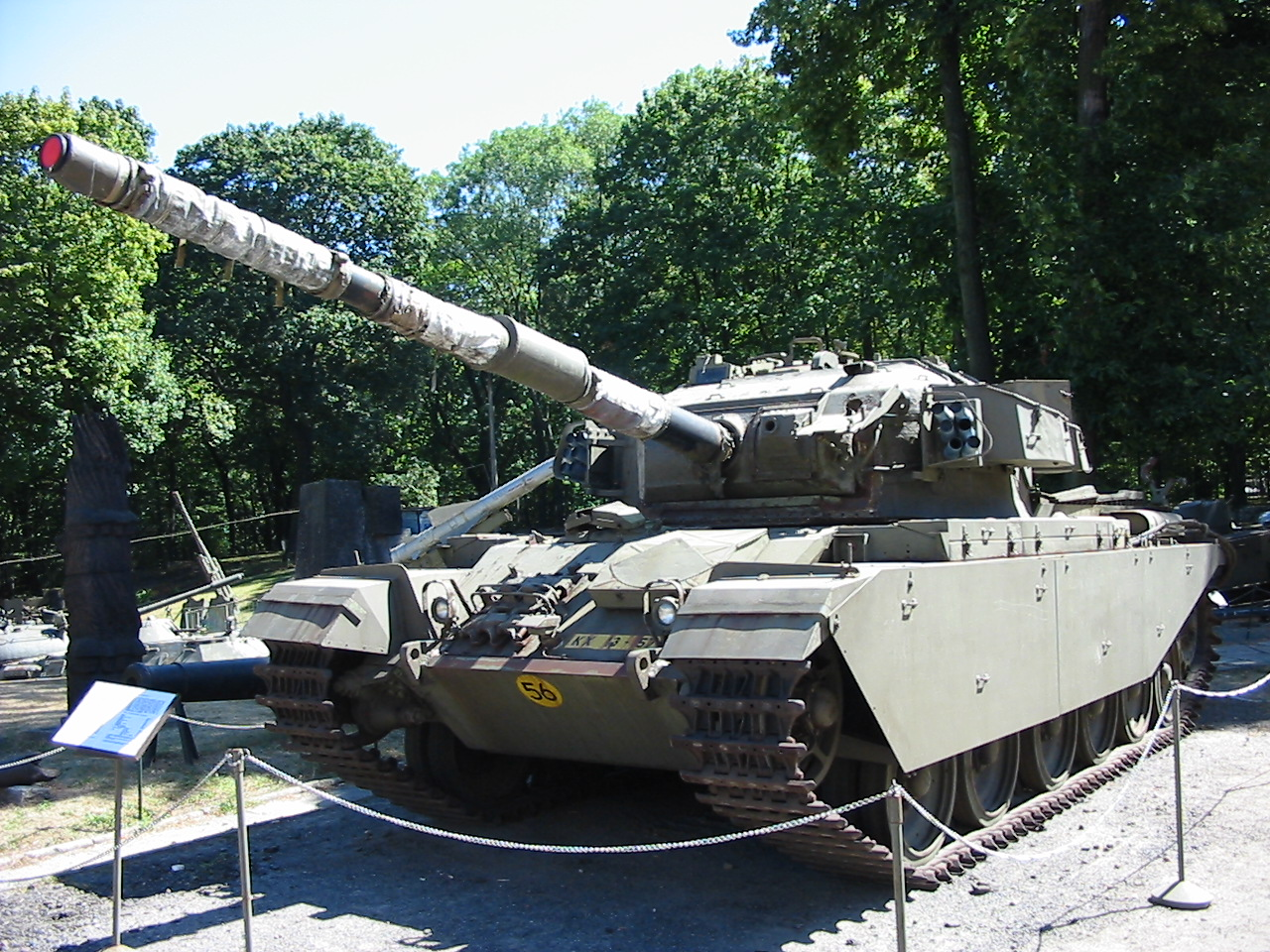
- An L7 mounted on a Centurion Mark 5
- Type: Rifled tank gun
- Place of origin: United Kingdom

Service history
- Used by: See Usage

Production history
- Designed: late 1950s
- Manufacturer: Royal Ordnance Factory; BAE Systems

Specifications
- Mass: 1,282 kg (2,826 lb)
- Length: 5.89 m (19 ft 4 in)
- Barrel length: 52 calibres 5.46 m (17 ft 11 in)
- Shell: 105×617mmR
- Calibre: 105 mm (4.13 in)
- Rate of fire: 10 rounds per minute (maximum)
- Maximum firing range: 4,000 m (4,400 yd)

The Royal Ordnance L7, officially designated Gun, 105 mm, Tank, L7, is the basic model of the United Kingdom's most successful tank gun. It is a 105 mm L/52 rifled design by the Royal Ordnance Factories, intended for use in armoured fighting vehicles, replacing the older QF 20-pounder (84 mm) gun mounted on the British Centurion tank. The successful L7 gun has been fitted on many armoured vehicles, including the Centurion (starting from the Mk. 5/2 variant), the German Leopard 1 and, in an altered design, as the M68 gun in several variants of the US M48 Patton and M60.

The L7 is a popular weapon and continued in use even after it was superseded by the L11 series 120 mm rifled tank gun, for some Centurion tanks operating as Artillery Forward Observation and Armoured Vehicle, Royal Engineers (AVRE) vehicles. The L7, and adaptations of it, can be found as standard or retrofitted equipment on a wide variety of tanks developed during the Cold War.

== History ==
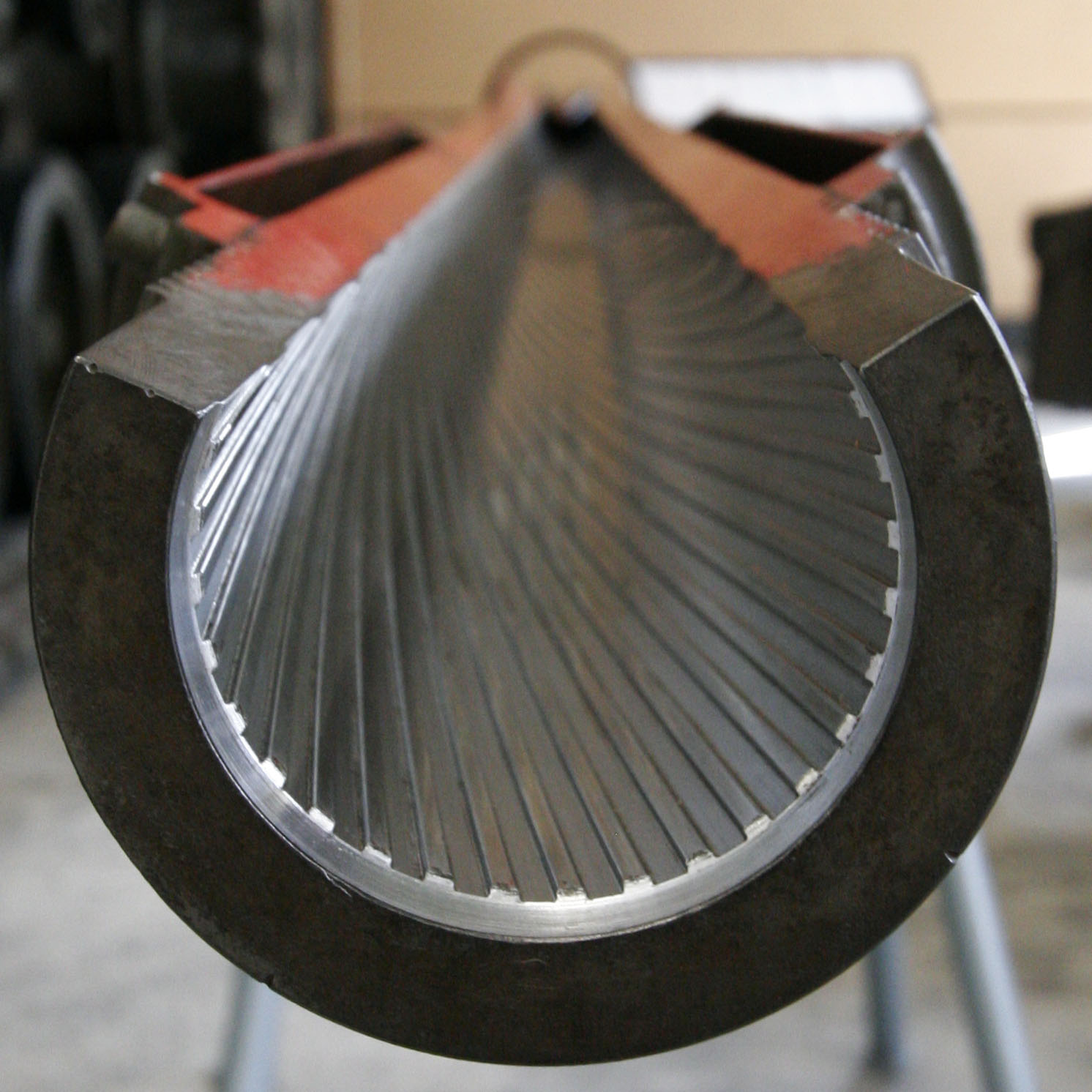
Model of L7 gun barrel cut to show rifling inside, on display at the Deutsches Panzermuseum

Both the United Kingdom and the United States had been developing projects for high calibre guns during WWII in order to compete with increasingly heavily armoured German tanks, and later for Cold War Soviet tanks. The US developed several heavy tank designs during this period, notable were the US 105 mm gun motor carriage T95 (also known as "super-heavy tank T28") as well as the QF 32-pounder mounted on the British A39 Tortoise heavy assault tank.

The US foresaw difficulties in engagements against the Soviet IS-3 and 4 with its M47 Patton. This led to the introduction of the M103, a heavy tank designed to counter Soviet heavy tanks. It mounted an extremely powerful 120 mm cannon but the ammunition was so large that it required two loaders, one for the shell and another for the separate propellant charge. Of the 300 M103s built, most went to the Marines. The UK came to the same conclusions and developed their own heavy tank, the Conqueror, which mounted the L1 120 mm gun.

=== United Kingdom ===
During the Hungarian Revolution of 1956, a Soviet medium tank T-54A was driven onto the grounds of the British embassy in Budapest by the Hungarians. After an examination of this tank's armour and 100 mm gun, British officials decided that the 20-pounder was incapable of defeating its frontal armour, meaning that the most common British tanks were no longer able to effectively deal with Soviet medium tank designs, let alone their heavy tanks.

These events spurred the United Kingdom to employ a new high-velocity tank gun in 1958, the Royal Ordnance L7 to keep existing Centurion tanks viable against this new Soviet tank design, while the United States began design development of the M60 tank in 1957 and user trials of the weapon in 1958. The L7 was specifically designed to fit into the turret mountings of the 20-pounder. This would enable the Centurion tanks to be up-gunned with minimum modifications; hence, the fleet could be upgraded in a shorter time and at a lower cost. The first production tank to integrate the L7 was a single up-armoured Centurion Mark 7 in 1958 to prove the future viability of up-armouring and up-gunning the Centurion. From 1959 onwards newly built Centurions incorporated the L7 at production.

=== Other users ===
The gun was subsequently adopted for use on the German Leopard 1 (for which the L7A3 variant was developed). In addition, several countries have used the gun to improve the firepower of existing main battle tanks. Derivatives have even been mounted in Warsaw Pact-built T-54 and T-55 tanks in Israel, India, Egypt and Iraq, and Type 79 tanks in China.

== Specification (L7A1) ==
- Calibre: 105 mm (4.13 in)
- Length: 5.588 m (18 ft 4.0 in)
- Barrel length: 52 calibres, 5.55 m (18 ft 3 in)
- Recoil length: 290 mm (11 in)
- Weight: 1,282 kg (2,826 lb)
- Rate of fire: 10 rounds per minute (maximum), 6 rounds per minute (normal)
- Barrel life: 200 EFC (800 with additives)
- Maximum effective range: 1,800 m (2,000 yd) (APDS), 4,000 m (4,400 yd) (HESH)
- Cartridge: 105×617mmR

== Variants ==
=== UK models ===
- L7A1

Standard UK production variant.

- L7A2

L7A1 fitted with a thermal sleeve.

- L7A3

Variant for the (West) German Leopard 1 MBT. The upper rear corner of the breech block reduced in size so gun can be depressed without hitting the turret roof.

- L7A4

L7A3 fitted with an Ernest Leitz Canada muzzle reference sensor. Used by the Belgian Leopard 1A5 (BE) and Canadian Leopard C1.

- L7 LRF

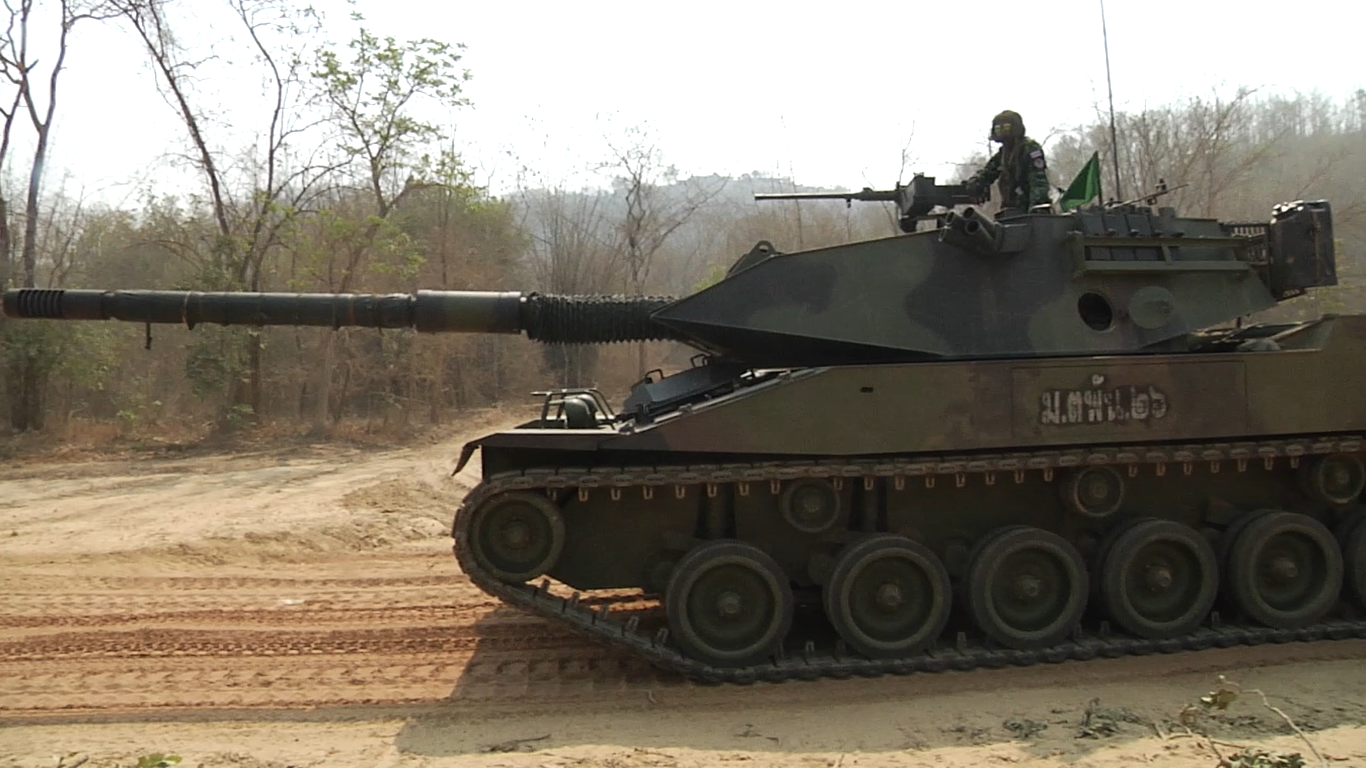
LRF gun on a Stingray tank

Low Recoil Force (LRF) version of the L7 used by the Stingray light tank.

- JSW 105mm L7A1 L/51

Japanese version of the first model produced on license for the Type 74 MBT. This version has an indigenous breech.

- Royal Ordnance 105mm IWS

A development by Royal Ordnance designated Improved Weapon System with an increased chamber pressure and a longer barrel length of L/63.4.

- FM K.4 Modelo 1L

Argentine Army's licence produced by Fabricaciones Militares in Argentina. Used on the TAM medium tank. Also designated as "105 mm FRT L51 Tank Gun".

=== Chinese models ===
- Type 79/81/81A/83

Chinese produced L7. Licence procured from Austria.

- ZPL-79

Chinese licence-built designation for the L7A3 with replaceable indigenous thermal sleeve. Also known as Type 79. It was mounted on the Type 80 tank prototypes.

- ZPL-81/A

Modified Type 79. ZPL-81A has improved thermal sleeve. First seen on the Type 59-II tank.

- ZPL-83/A

Modified Type 81 with longer barrel and improved construct material. Also known as Type 83. It was fitted on the Type 59D1, Type 63HG, Type 79 tank and Type 88B tank.

- ZPL-94

Modified Type 83 with longer barrel at 62 caliber. Mounted on Type 59D tank and Type 88A tank.

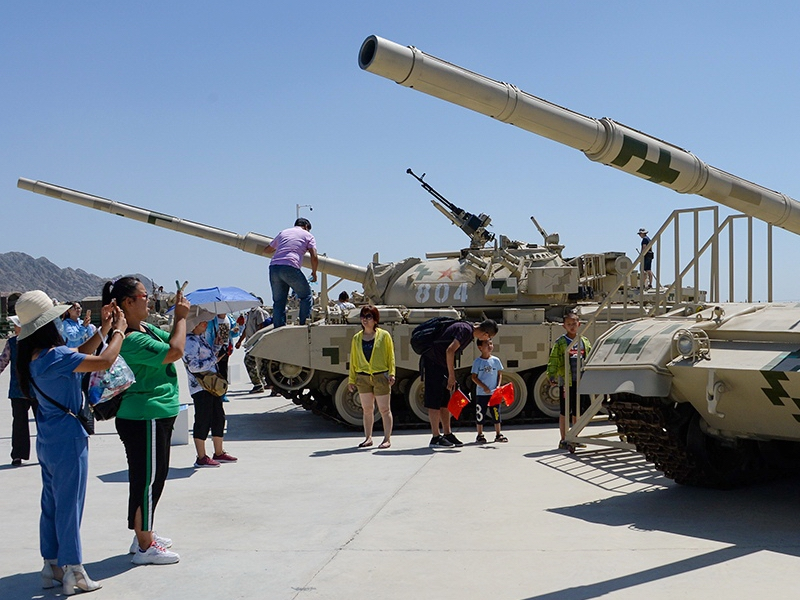
62 caliber ZPL-94 on a Type 88A tank

- ZPL-98

Modified Type 83A rifled gun with an indigenous low recoil muzzle brake and lighter weight. It was mounted on the Type 63A amphibious tank. Also known as Type 98 rifled gun.

- ZPL-98A

Modified Type 98 rifled gun, mounted on ZTD-05 and ZTL-11.

- ZPL-151

Modified ZPL-94 for use on the ZTQ-15 light tank.

=== Other developments ===
- GT-3

South African variant built by Denel for converting Centurion with 20-pounder gun into Olifant tanks. GT-3 retained the breach assemblies of 20-pounder paired with the modified copy of L7 barrel.

- GT-7

South African variant built by Denel for the Olifant Mk1A and Rooikat 105. Incorporates a heavily modified recoil assembly.

- Rheinmetall Rh-105 family

Multiple variants of 105 mm tank gun developed from L7 by Rheinmetall of Germany for commercial market. The family consisted of Rh 105–60, Rh 105–40, Rh 105–30, Rh 105–20, and Rh 105-11. The last two numbers on the designation denotes the gun recoil force in metric ton. The Rh 105-20 and -11 models were fitted with muzzle brake and intended to be mounted on light tanks and wheeled armored vehicles. The variants has been fitted as modification on various armored vehicles, such as Rh 105-30 on Spanish M47E2, Rh 105-20 on Ikv 91 and AMX-10 RC, and Rh 105-11 on MOWAG Shark.

- L74

Swedish model built by Bofors for the Strv 103 using more sophisticated recoil assembly and a longer L/62 gun tube for increased muzzle-velocity and accuracy.

== Usage ==
=== L7 variant ===
- Centurion: L7A1 cannon on late Centurion models and derivatives such as Olifant
- Vickers MBT: Mark 1, Mark 3, and Mark 4 models
  - Vijayanta
- Leopard 1: L7A3 cannon
- Leopard 2AV: Some of the prototype fitted with L7A3
- M48 Patton: in some upgraded variants
  - M48A2GA2: West German modification
  - Super M48: German modernization of M48A2 or M48A3
  - M48A5E: Spanish modification
  - M48A5T2: Turkish modification
- Stingray light tank: LRF cannon
- M41 Walker Bulldog: LRF cannon on M41 105 variant
- LAV-600: LRF cannon
- Type 74: JSW L7A1 L/51 version produced on license by Japan
- T-54/55: in some upgraded variants
  - Type 59-II: Chinese modification of T-54
  - Type 59 Royal Ordnance: British modernization of Type 59
  - Tiran-4Sh: Israeli modification of T-54, both L7 and M68 variants fitted
  - Tiran-5Sh: Israeli modification of T-55, both L7 and M68 variants fitted
  - T-55M3: Israeli modernization of T-54/55
  - T-55 "Gulmohar": Indian modernization of T-55
  - M-55S: Slovenian modernization of T-55
  - Type 72Z/Safir-74: Iranian modernization of T-55
- Charioteer: A single prototype up-gunned with L7 cannon
- FV4401 Contentious: The only prototype was later up-gunned with L7 cannon
- Panzer 58: Production model
- Panzer 61
- Panzer 68
- TAM medium tank
- Rooikat 105
- TH-400 and TH-800
- Tiam MBT

=== ZPL variant ===
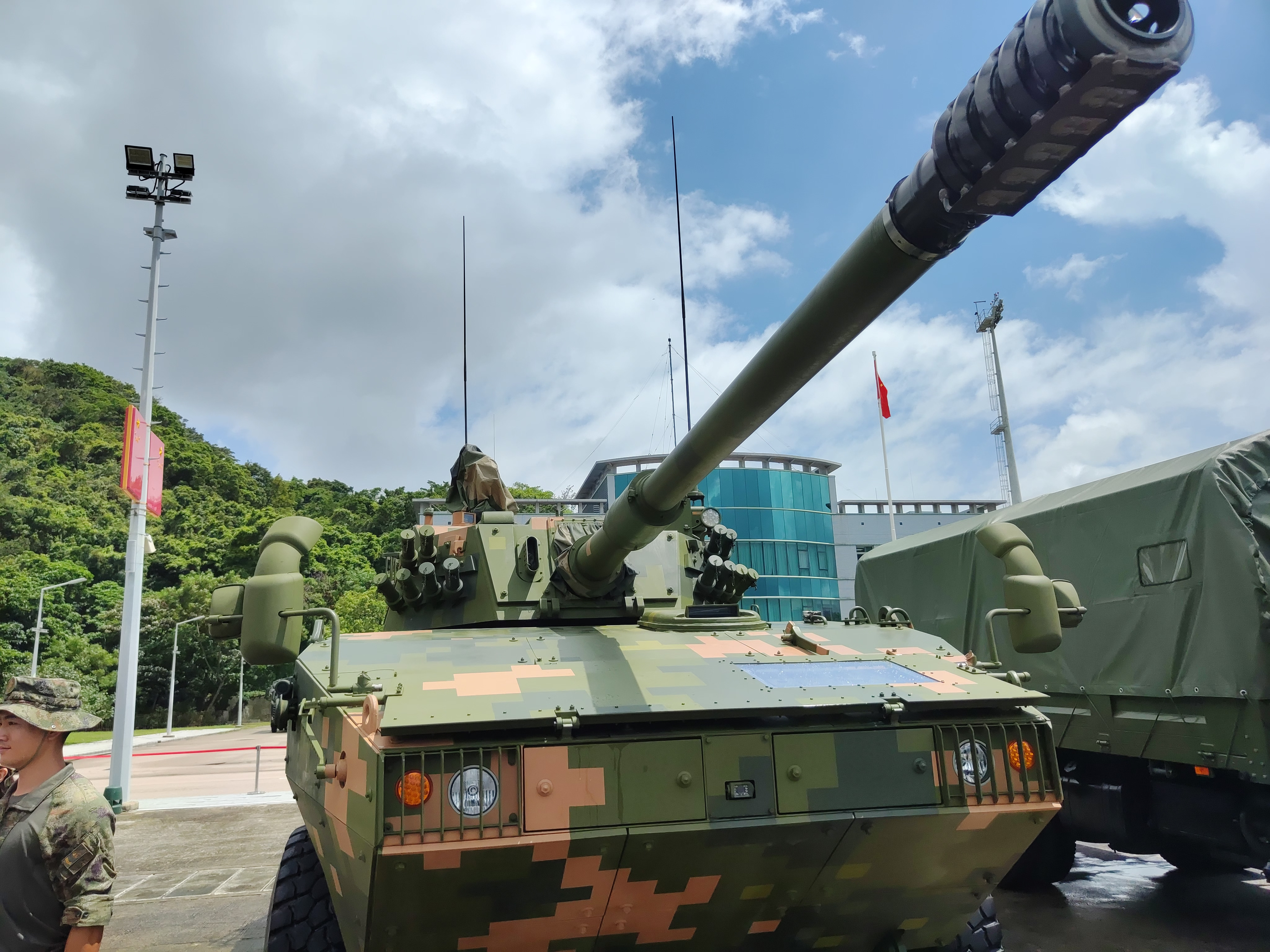
ZPL-98A rifled gun mounted on the ZTL-11 assault vehicle

- T-54/55: ZPL-83 in some upgraded kits sold by China
- Type 59: in some upgraded variants
  - Type 59-II: ZPL-79, ZPL-81
  - Type 59-IIA: ZPL-81A
  - Type 59D1: ZPL-83A
  - Type 59D: ZPL-94
- Type 69: in some upgraded variants
  - Type 69-IIG: An upgraded Bangladeshi variant of Type 69 tank
  - Type 79: ZPL-83
  - Type 79-II: ZPL-83A
- Type 80: ZPL-79
  - Type 85-I: ZPL-79
  - Type 85-II: ZPL-94
  - Type 88: ZPL-83A
  - Type 88A: ZPL-94
- Type 62G: ZPL-98 modification
- Type 63: in some upgraded variants
  - Type 63HG: ZPL-83A modification
  - Type 63A: ZPL-98
- MMT-40: Myanmar-built light tank with WMA301 turret and gun
- WMA301: Modified ZPL-94
- ST-1: Modified ZPL-94
- ST-2: Modified ZPL-94
- ZTD-05: ZPL-98A
- ZTL-11: ZPL-98A
- ZTQ-15: ZPL-151

=== Related designs with compatible ammunition ===
- MB-3 Tamoyo III
- EE-T1 Osório
- OF-40
- Strv 103
- VT 1-1
- M47 Patton: in some upgraded variants
  - M47E2: Spanish modification armed with a Rheinmetall RH-105/30 gun
  - M47 OTO: Italian modification armed with an OTO Melara 105 mm/52 gun
- Marder Medium Tank: Marder IFV armed with OTO Melara 105 mm/52 gun
- B1 Centauro: Italian wheeled armored vehicle with OTO Melara 105mm/52 gun
- Type 16 maneuver combat vehicle: Japanese wheeled armored vehicle with Japan Steel Works 105 mm/52 gun

== Bibliography ==
- Cullen, Tony; Foss, Christopher F., eds. (1993). Jane's AFV Retrofit Systems 1993-94 (Sixth ed.). Jane's Information Group.
- Hunnicutt, R. P. (1984). Patton: A History of the American Main Battle Tank. Presidio Press. ISBN 0-89141-230-1.
- Starry, Donn A., General. "Mounted Combat In Vietnam." Vietnam Studies. Department of the Army. First printing 1978.
- Zaloga, Steven J. and Hugh Johnson (2004). T-54 and T-55 Main Battle Tanks 1944–2004. Oxford: Osprey. ISBN 1-84176-792-1
