= FV4401 Contentious =

Contentious I
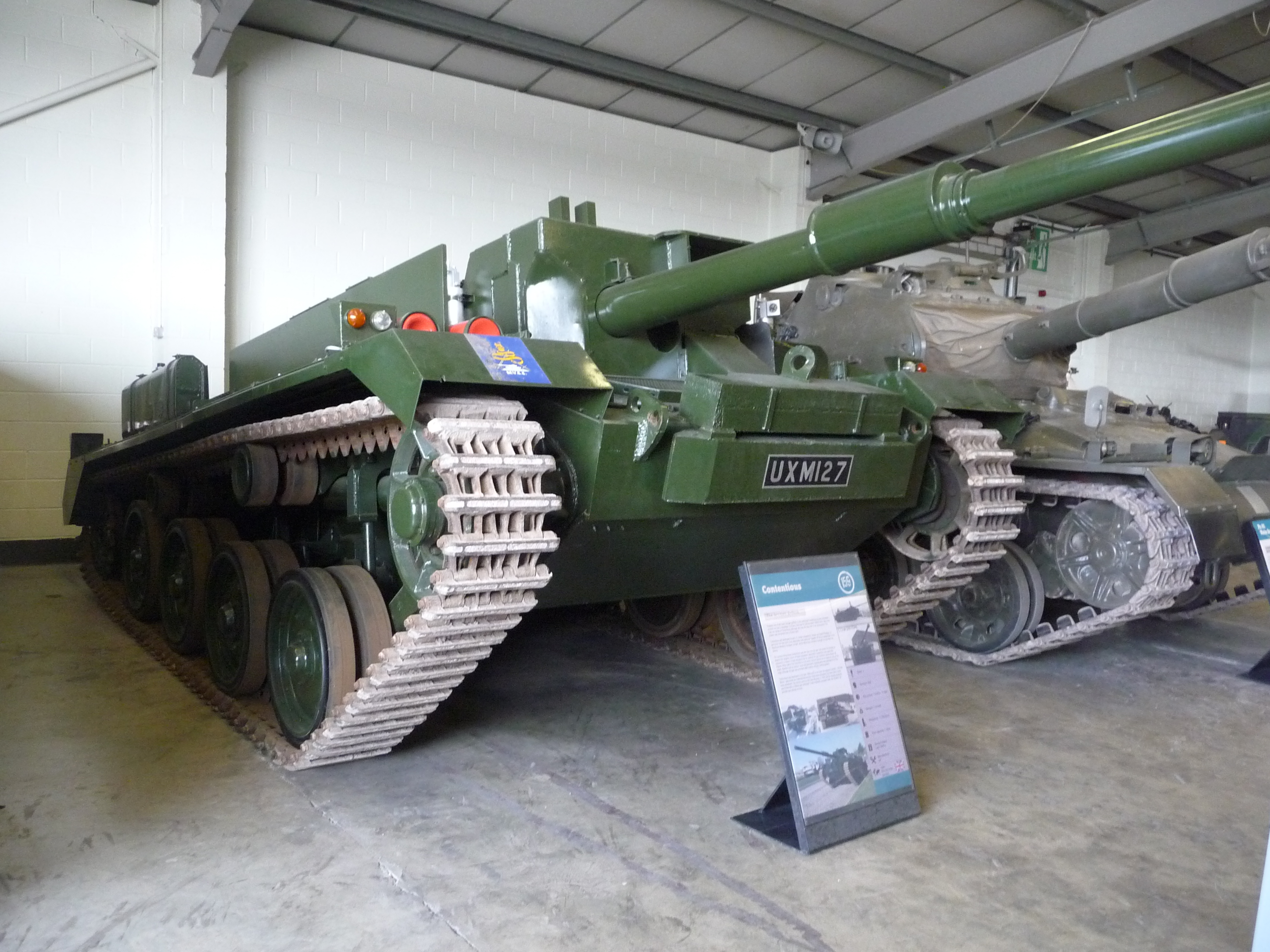
- Contentious I, The Tank Museum, Bovington (2010)
- Type: Air-portable tank destroyer
- Place of origin: United Kingdom

Service history
- In service: Prototype only
- Used by: British Army

Production history
- No. built: possibly up to three constructed

Specifications
- Length: 8.5 m (27 ft 11 in)
- Width: 3.1 m (10 ft 2 in)
- Crew: 2
- Main armament: Ordnance QF 20 pounder
- Engine: Rolls-Royce B range
- Suspension: Hydraulic elevation control
- Operational range: 500 miles (planned)

Contentious I was a British air-portable tank destroyer testbed which came about in the late 50s as part of Project Prodigal, a huge overlapping project aimed at the future generation of British vehicles. The Contentious project is often misattributed the “FV4401” title, but this designation was merely used for an earlier design which was not directly connected to the Contentious I, though lessons learned from the FV4401 were applied to successor vehicles.

At least one Contentious I has been constructed and tested, although no production vehicles were built or put into service as it was never intended to be more than a testing vehicle.

== Project Prodigal ==
The vehicle was developed as part of Project Prodigal, which give rise to the Combat Vehicle Reconnaissance (Tracked) series of British light armoured tracked and vehicles. as research into future armoured fighting vehicles. The intention was to produce an air-portable tank destroyer. The vehicle was to provide for a flexible strategic response to conflicts around the vestiges of the Empire. Despite the low intensity of such conflicts, it was assumed that the increasing supply of Soviet T-54 tanks to satellite states would require an anti-tank capability greater than previous light tanks.

This was not seen as a substitute for a main battle tank, which would have to be heavily armed to deal with the massed and thickly armoured Soviet tanks of the Cold War. In particular, there was no attempt made at protection against the NBC threat that was expected for any European conflict.

== Contentious ==
A particularly lightweight vehicle was needed, which restricted the possibility of a conventional tank with a conventional turret. The path chosen was that of a low-profile open hull with a semi-fixed gun, similar to the layout of the wartime Alecto. The small hull could accommodate only a crew of two, which in turn required an autoloader, particularly for the heavy armament and ammunition in mind.

The gun chosen was the QF 20 pounder (84 mm), already in use in the Centurion tank, with the autoloader. The mount was fixed in elevation and had only a limited traverse. Most aiming relied on steering the entire tank on its tracks. Elevation used an unusual system, a hydraulic suspension system, with independent height control of each wheel station, which allowed the tank chassis to be tilted back and forth. This system had already been demonstrated in the Swedish S-tank. The chassis components were based on those of the Comet tank, although with only four road wheels rather than the Comet's five. The prototype was completed and tested on the firing ranges of Kirkcudbright Training Area.

This was only a boilerplate example; it was unarmoured and the armour layout design had not been completed and the body of relatively high and vertical plates is unlikely to have been the shape or the material used for a final example. In particular, the petrol tanks were exposed and mounted above the track guards.

The vehicle was also tested at Lulworth, in tests against a wheeled vehicle to test the virtues of tracked and wheeled arrangements for the Prodigal air-portable tank destroyer. The vehicle chosen was the Rhino, a six-wheeled skid-steered experimental chassis, powered by a Rolls-Royce Meteorite engine. Drivers were instructed to drive in pursuit of fixed and moving targets and to track them with a simple windscreen-mounted sight. The Rhino's steering was infamously imprecise and it was found that the tracked Contentious performed better.

As with the Centurion, Contentious was later up-gunned; first tested with the 84 mm 20 pounder, the Bovington example later gained a L7 105 mm gun, derived from the 20 pounder. The replacement was relatively easy, as the 105 mm is largely a rebarrelled version of the 84 mm and has a similar breech. Photographs of the prototype do show some change to the recoil cylinders between the two.

== FV4401 Contentious ==
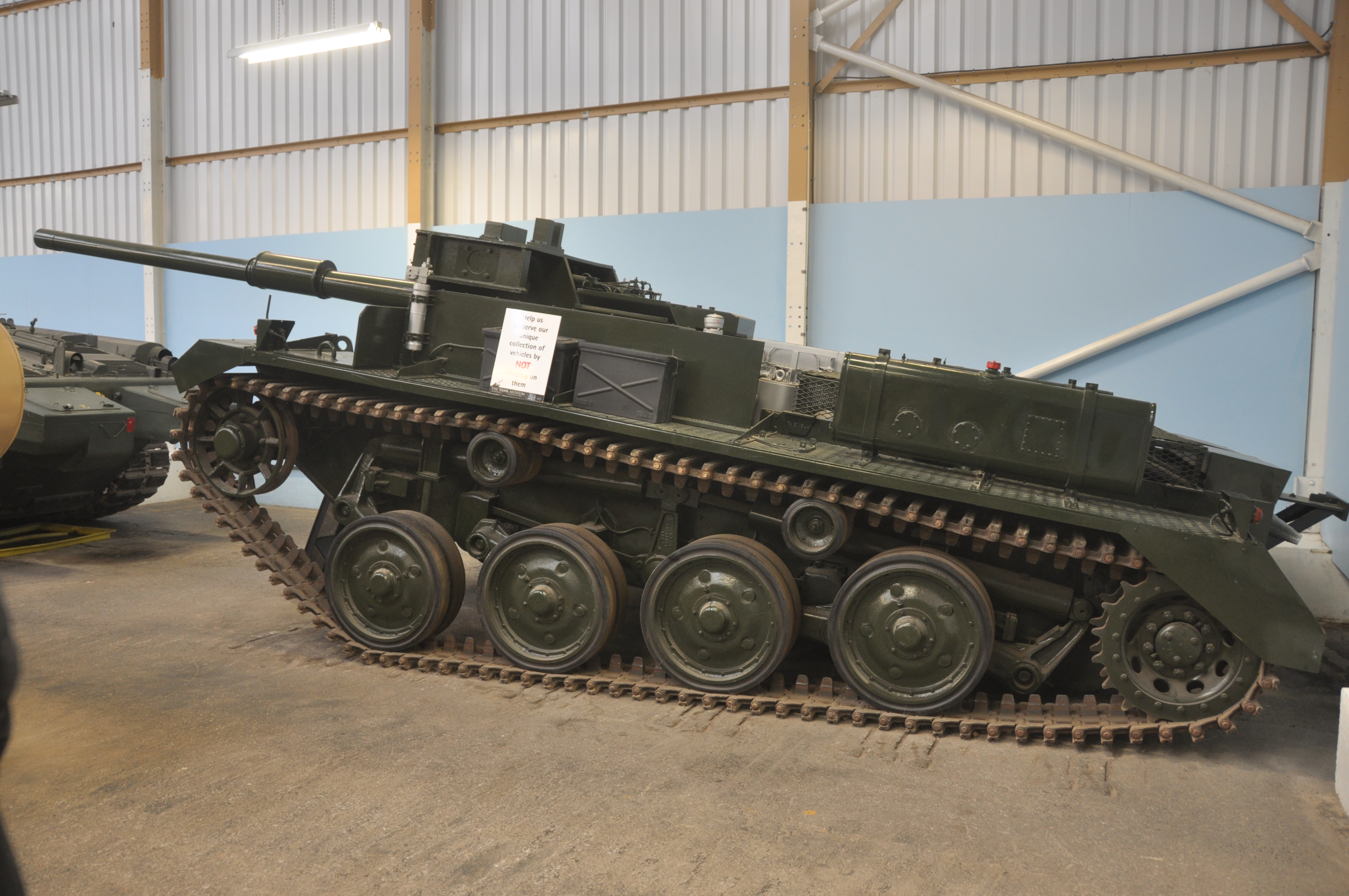
side view of Contentious

The original weapons chosen to be studied in the FV4401 Contentious project were four recoilless guns with one round each for a total of four shots before a reload was needed. This was deemed extremely impractical, and so two guns were dropped and in place it was to feature either exterior 120 millimeter recoilless guns with revolver style magazines containing seven rounds each, 18 5-inch rockets, or three guided missiles. All of the weapons were to be externally mounted to keep the internal hull dimensions as low as possible, however, only the gun option was considered in any real depth.

The rifles were on a swivelling mounting above a low boat-shaped hull with conventional suspension, crewed by a commander-driver-gunner. The mounting could elevate conventionally. The autoloaders and their ammunition were carried in armoured boxes above the hull, with the reaction nozzles of the recoilless rifle protruding behind. Sighting for these recoilless rifles was to be the same M8C .50 inch spotting rifles, one for each barrel, as used with the WOMBAT recoilless rifle.

== See also ==
- Stridsvagn 103 – (Sweden) S-tank, the first serial production vehicle with hydraulic suspension gun elevation.

=== Comparable vehicles ===
- M56 Scorpion – (United States)
- M50 Ontos – (United States)
- ASU-57 – (Soviet Union)
- Type 60 Self-propelled 106 mm Recoilless Gun – (Japan)
- VT tank – (West Germany)

== Survivors ==
- The prototype, UXM127, is on display at The Tank Museum in Bovington, UK.
