= M56 Scorpion =

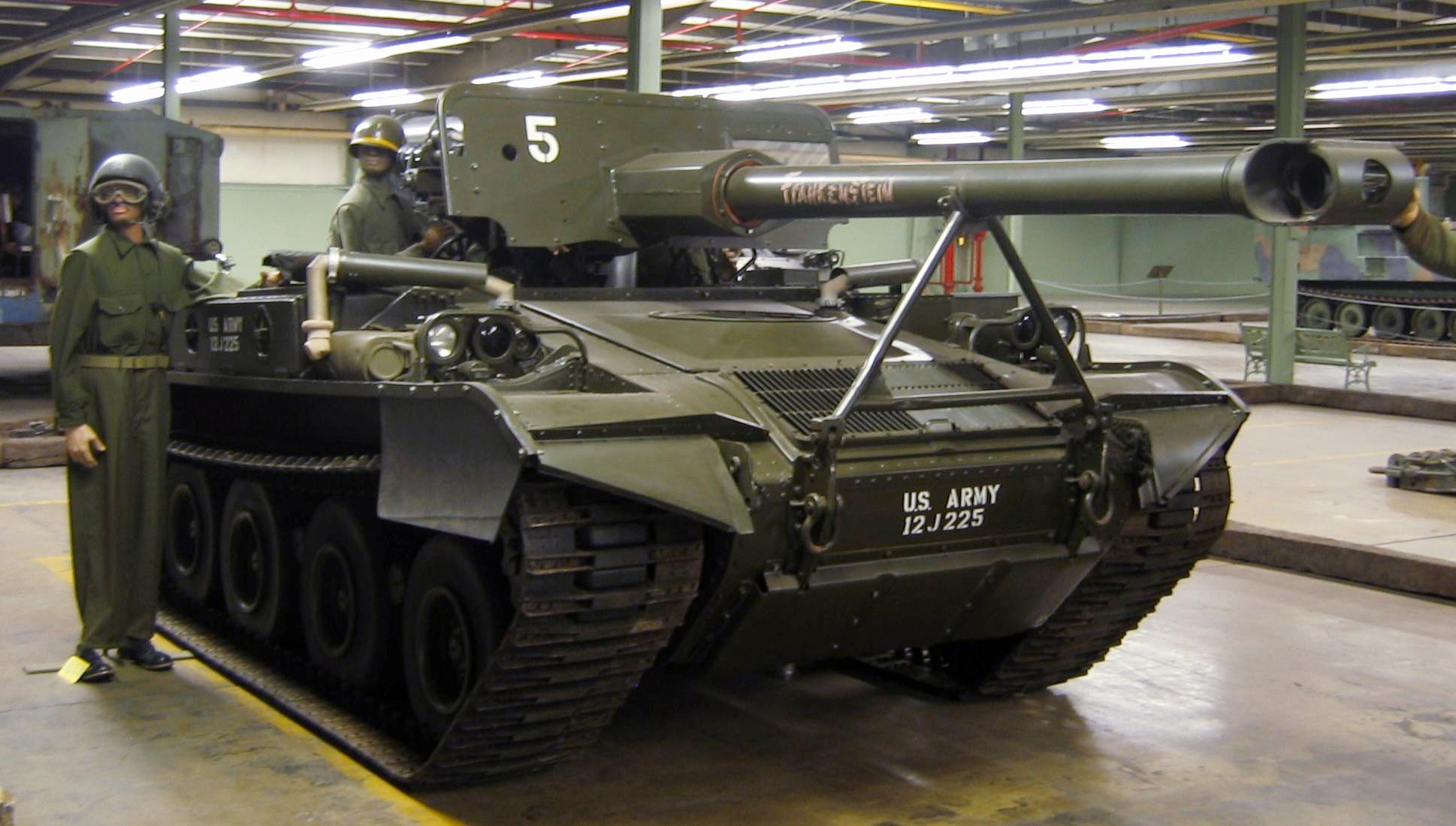
- M56 Scorpion preserved at the American Armored Foundation Tank Museum in Danville, Virginia.
- Type: Self-propelled gun
- Place of origin: United States

Service history
- Used by: See Operators
- Wars: Vietnam War; Western Sahara War

Production history
- Manufacturer: Cadillac Motor Car Division of General Motors
- Produced: 1953–1959
- No. built: 325

Specifications
- Mass: 7.1 tonnes (16,000 lb)
- Length: 4.55 metres (14 ft 11 in) (excluding gun); 5.84 metres (19 ft 2 in) (overall)
- Width: 2.57 metres (8 ft 5 in)
- Height: 2.05 metres (6 ft 9 in) over gun shield
- Crew: 4 (commander, gunner, loader and driver)
- Armor: unarmored except for blast shield
- Main armament: 90 mm M54 Gun; 29 rounds
- Engine: Continental AOI-403-5 gasoline engine 200 brake horsepower (150 kW)
- Transmission: Allison CD-150-4, 2 ranges forward, 1 reverse
- Suspension: Torsion tube over bar at wheels 1 and 4, torsion bar at wheels 2 and 3
- Ground clearance: 0.32 m (1 ft 1 in)
- Fuel capacity: 210 litres (46 imp gal; 55 US gal)
- Operational range: 230 kilometres (140 mi)
- Maximum speed: 45 kilometres per hour (28 mph)

The M56 "Scorpion" self-propelled gun is an American unarmored, airmobile self-propelled tank destroyer, which was armed with a 90 mm M54 gun with a simple blast shield, and an unprotected crew compartment.

== History ==
The M56 was manufactured from 1953 to 1959 by the Cadillac Motor Car Division of General Motors for use by US airborne forces, though the vehicle was eventually used by the Spanish Navy Marines, Morocco and South Korea. With a crew of four (commander, gunner, loader and driver), the M56 weighed 6.4 tonnes (14,000 lb) empty and 7.7 tonnes (17,000 lb) combat-loaded. It had infrared driving lights but no NBC protection and was not amphibious.

The M56 was a fully tracked vehicle with rubber-tired run-flat road wheels and front drive sprocket wheels. It was powered by a Continental AOI-403-5 gasoline engine developing 200 brake horsepower (150 kW) at 3,000 rpm, allowing a maximum road speed of 28 miles per hour (45 km/h) and a maximum range of 140 miles (230 km). Twenty-nine rounds of main gun ammunition were carried, and only the small 5 mm thick blast shield was armored.

== In service ==
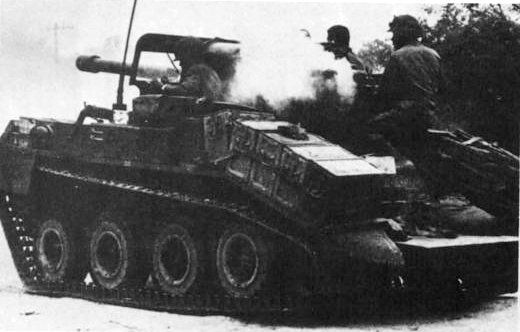
M56 Scorpion of 16th Armor, US 173rd Airborne Brigade firing at Viet Cong during Operation Toledo 17 June 1966

The M56 saw combat service with U.S. forces in the Vietnam War. It was deployed with the 173rd Airborne Brigade, which was the only Airborne Brigade deployed with the M56, where it was used mainly in direct fire-support. Its function as an air-mobile, self-propelled, anti-tank vehicle was eventually replaced in Vietnam by the troubled but effective M551 Sheridan which had a fully armored turret. The USMC used the M50 Ontos, which had an armored cabin and was armed with recoilless rifles, in a similar role (the running gear of the first Ontos prototype was the same as on the M56, but it was replaced for the production variant).

As for foreign operators, Morocco was the only export customer which used M56 Scorpions in combat. M56 Scorpions were deployed against Polisario rebels during the Western Sahara War. A number of examples were made available to South Korea but not used.

== Operators ==
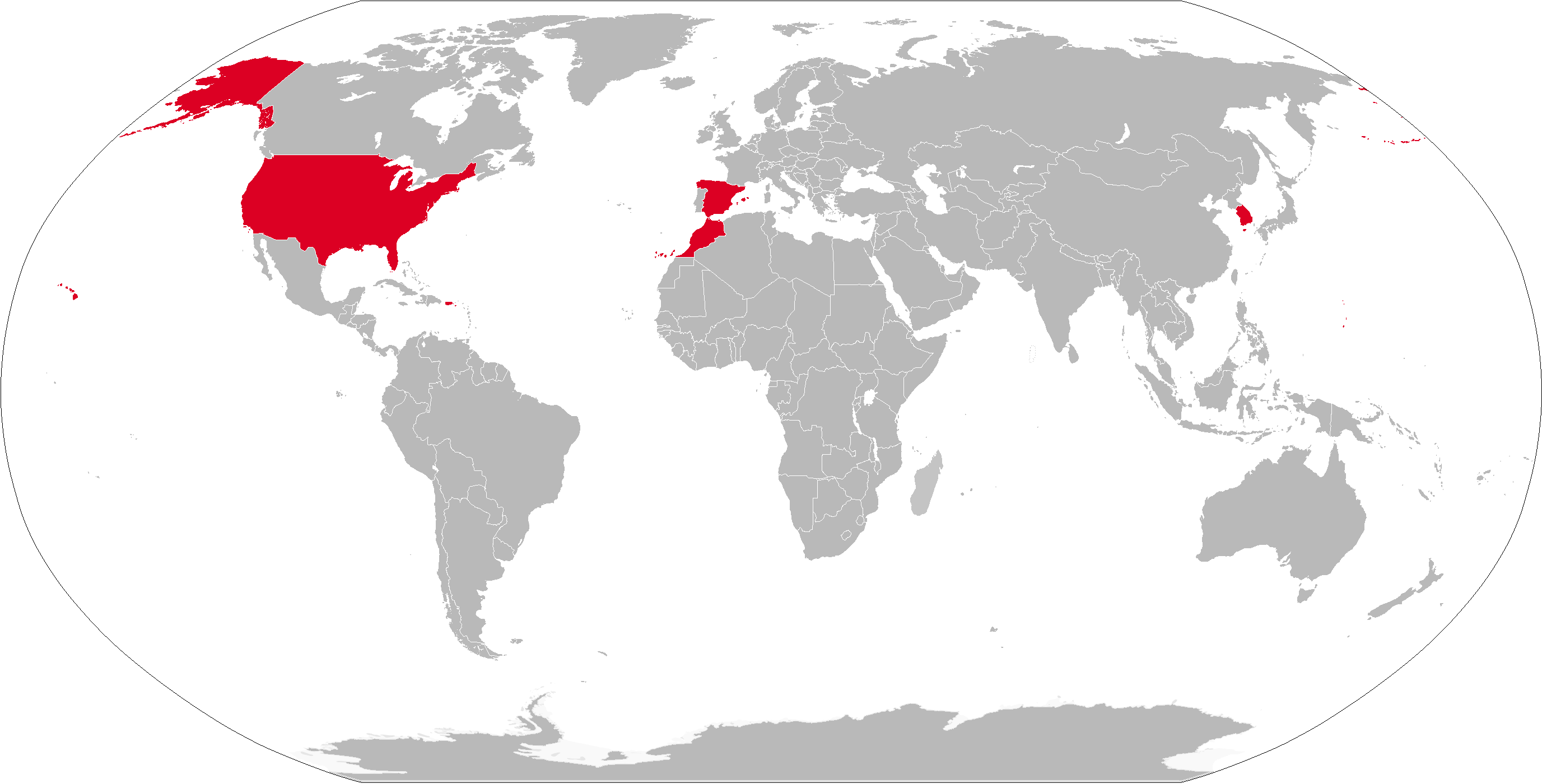
Map of former M56 operators in red

=== Former operators ===
- United States
- Spain: 5 exported in 1965. Used by Tercio de Armada from 1966 to 1970
- West Germany: 1 for evaluation in 1960
- Morocco: 87 received in 1966-1967
- Republic of Korea: 60 ex-American M56 were left as surplus but never used

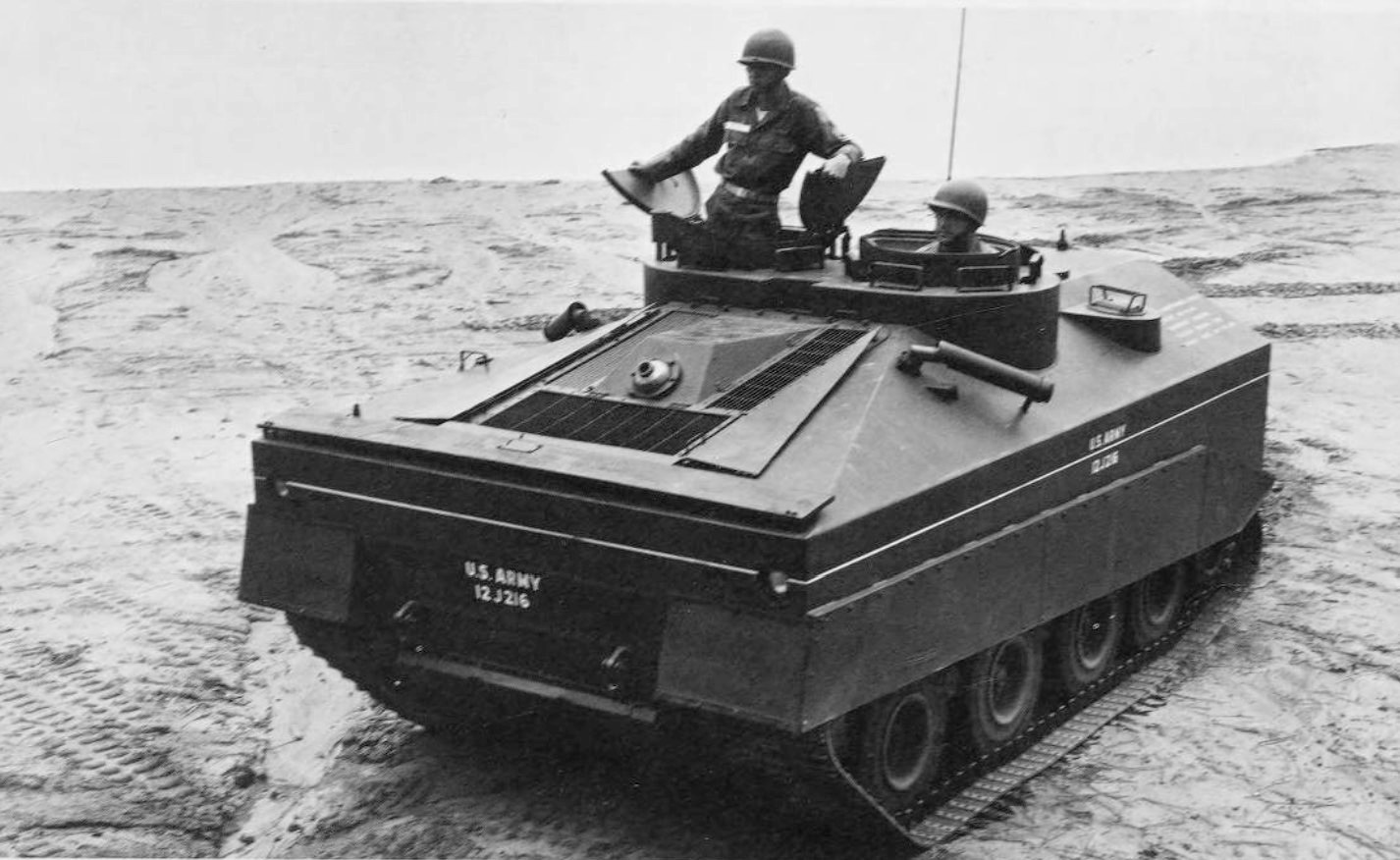
An APC based on the Scorpion

== Survivors ==
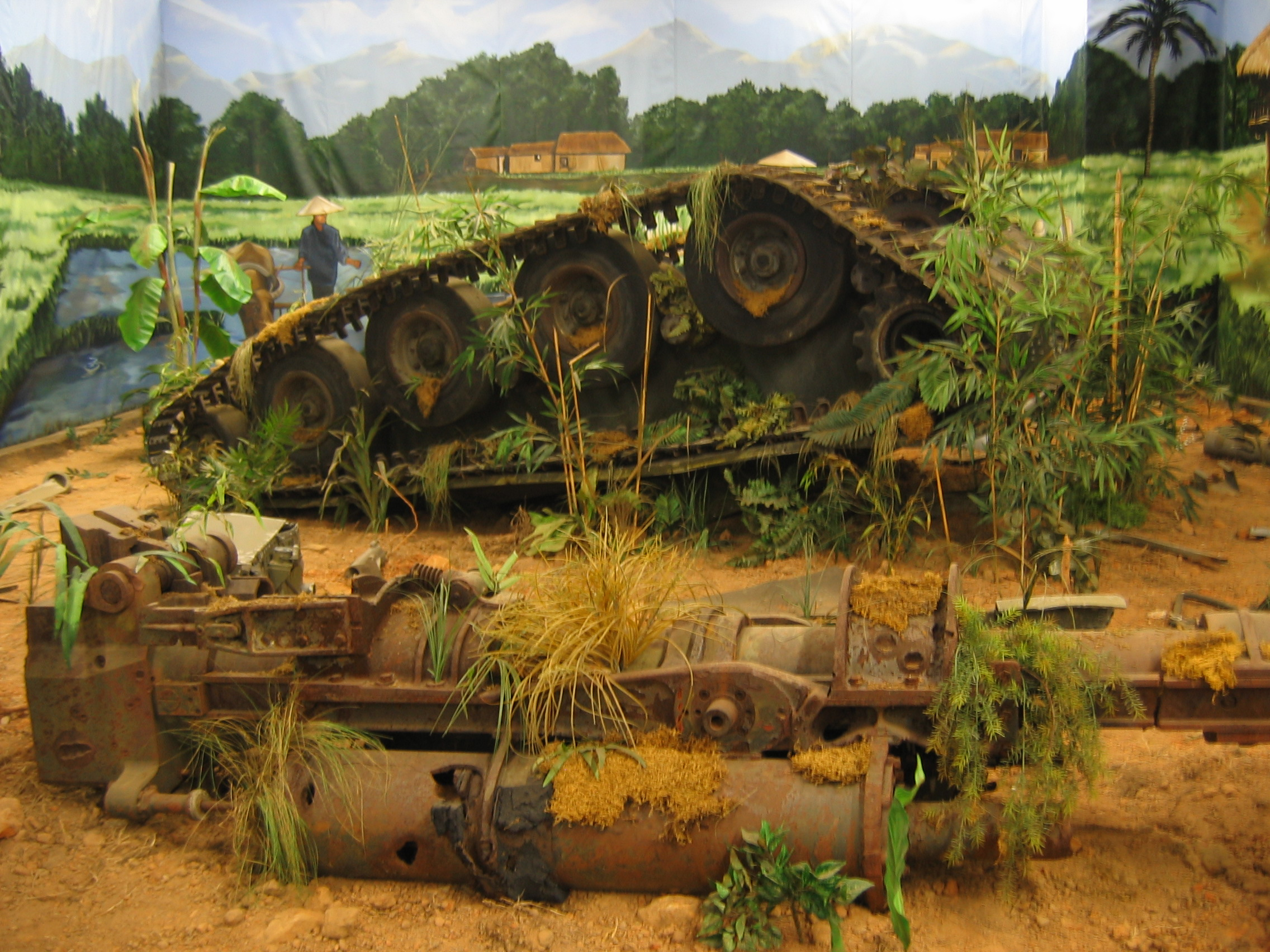
Diorama of destroyed M56 at the AAF Tank Museum. Note the prominent rubber tires on the road wheels.

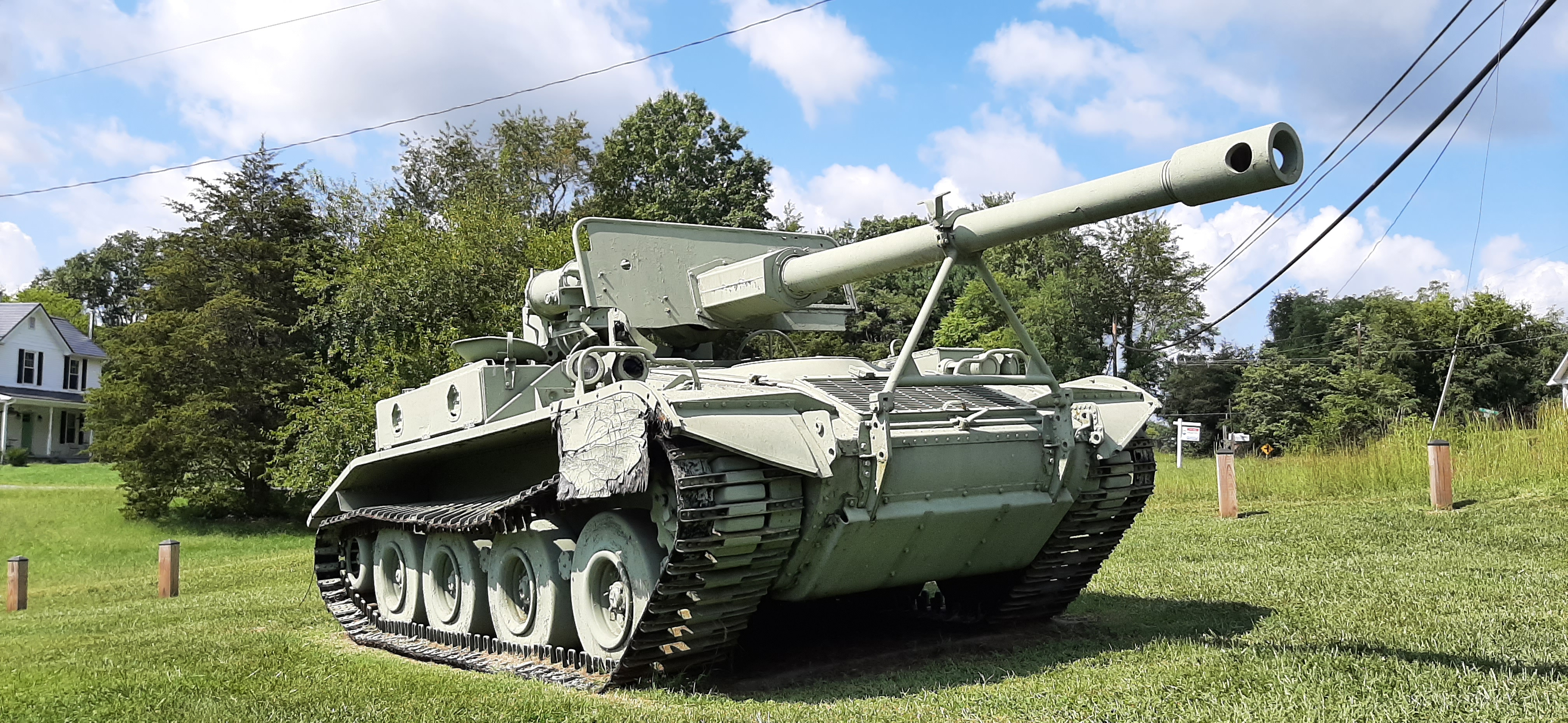
The outdoor display of M56 Scorpion 1740950 at VFW Post 2524, Culpeper, VA.

United States

- American Legion Post 8 in Guntersville, Alabama.
- Two of them can be found in The American Military Museum in South El Monte, California.
- American Legion post in Duluth, Georgia.
- Ropkey Armor Museum in Crawfordsville, Indiana
- Veterans Memorial Stadium in Cedar Rapids, Iowa.
- Iowa Gold Star Museum at Camp Dodge in Johnston, Iowa.
- Combat Air Museum at the former Forbes Field, in Topeka, Kansas.
- Forest Hill Station in Millersburg, Kentucky.
- Boyd County War Memorial in Armco Park in Summit, Kentucky.
- Oldtown VFW Post 9451, Oldtown, Maryland.
- Collings Foundation in Stow, Massachusetts.
- Mississippi Armed Forces Museum, Camp Shelby, Mississippi.
- Disabled American Veterans Belleville Hall, Belleville, New Jersey.
- Elmwood Park, New Jersey.
- 82nd Airborne War Memorial Museum in Fort Bragg, North Carolina.
- Fort Sill, Oklahoma
- 45th Infantry Museum in Oklahoma City, Oklahoma.
- Corner of Elk St. and 3rd St., Elkton, South Dakota
- American Legion Hall, Post 88, in Donelson, Tennessee.
- Texas Military Forces Museum, Camp Mabry in Austin, Texas.
- Veterans of Foreign Wars Post 2524 Culpeper, Virginia.
- American Armored Foundation Tank Museum in Danville, Virginia, along with a diorama of a destroyed M56.
- Auburn, Washington.
- Tillicum Park in Forks, Washington.
- National Museum of Military Vehicles in Dubois, Wyoming

South Korea

- One former Republic of Korea Army example on display at the War Memorial of Korea.

New Zealand

- One example in M&M Military Vehicle Museum (Private Museum) under restoration.

== See also ==
- G-numbers (SNL G289)
- M-numbers
- FV4401 Contentious

== Bibliography ==
- Estes, Kenneth W (2016). M50 Ontos and M56 Scorpion 1956–70: US Tank Destroyers of the Vietnam War. New Vanguard 240. Osprey Publishing. ISBN 9781472814739.
- Rottman, Gordon L.; Anderson, Duncan (22 April 2008). The US Army in the Vietnam War 1965−73. Bloomsbury USA. ISBN 9781846032394.
