= Stridsvagn 103 =

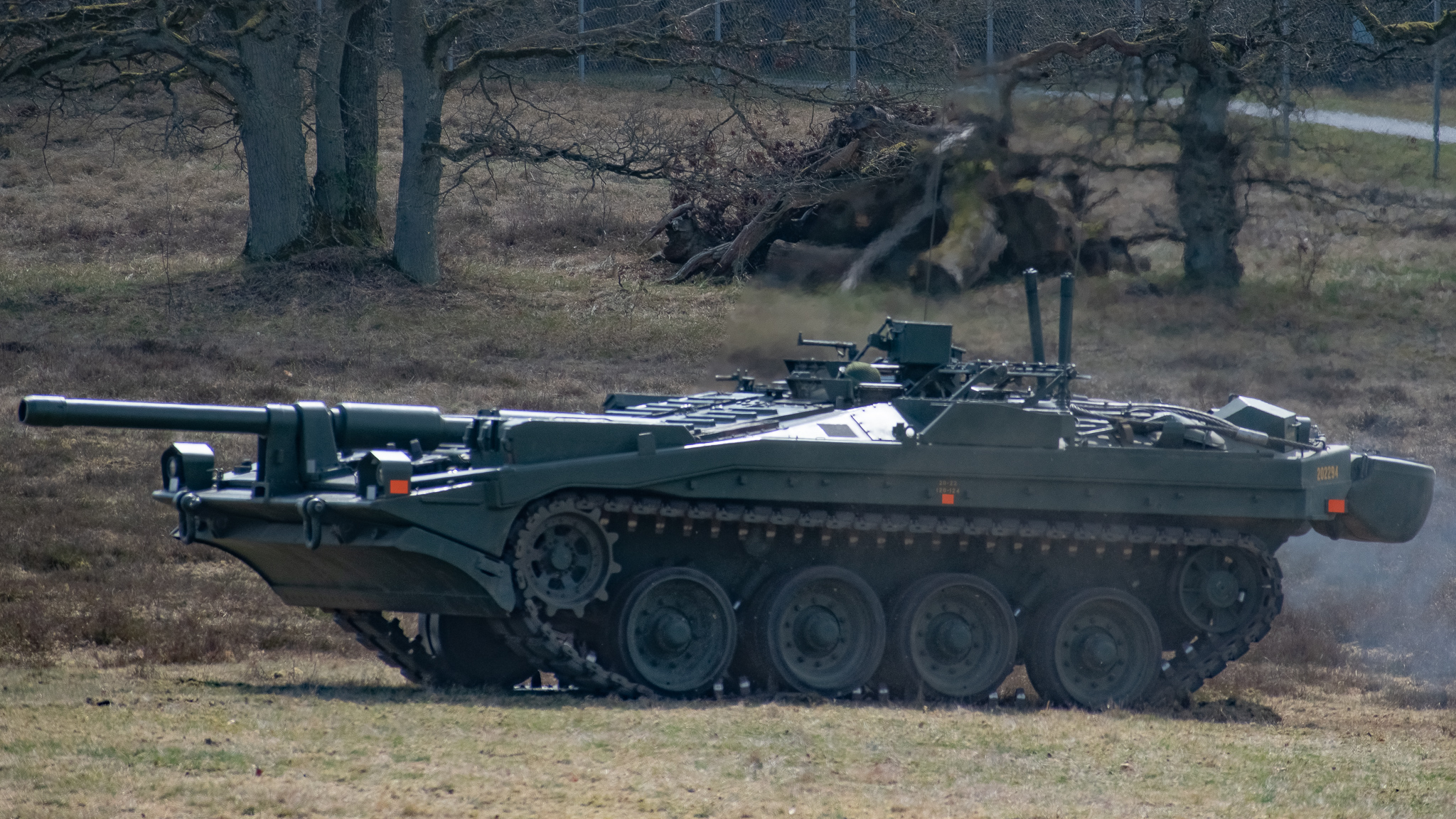
- A Stridsvagn 103 B during a demonstration at the Swedish Army's Revingehed training ground, April 2022
- Type: Turretless main battle tank
- Place of origin: Sweden

Service history
- In service: 1967–1997
- Used by: Swedish Army

Production history
- Designer: Sven Berge
- Designed: 1956; 70 years ago
- Manufacturer: Bofors AB
- Unit cost: US$ 442,750~ / 4,940,000~ (2026)
- Produced: 1967–1971
- No. built: 290
- Variants: 0, A, B, C, D, MV

Specifications (Strv 103C)
- Mass: 42.5 t (46.8 short tons; 41.8 long tons)
- Length: 9 m (29 ft 6 in) incl. gun
- Width: 3.80 m (12 ft 6 in)
- Height: With topmounted MG: 2.43 m (8 ft 0 in); To cupola: 2.14 m (7 ft 0 in); To vehicle roof: 1.90 m (6 ft 3 in); To barrel centre when horizontal: 1.70 m (5 ft 7 in)
- Crew: 3 (Commander, gunner/driver, rear driver)
- Armor: LOS: ≈192–337 mm Actual: 40–70 mm
- Main armament: Bofors L74 10.5 cm L/62 rifled gun with autoloader and 50 rounds
- Secondary armament: Two fixed 7.62 mm KSP 58 machine guns one anti-aircraft 7.62 mm KSP 58 machine gun two 71 mm Lyran mortars
- Engine: Detroit diesel 6V53T, 216 kW (290 hp) and Caterpillar 553 gas turbine, 365 kW (489 hp)
- Power/weight: 13.6 kW/t (18.3 hp/t)
- Transmission: 2 forward and 2 reverse speeds
- Suspension: Gas-hydraulic hydropneumatic suspension
- Operational range: 390 km (240 mi)
- Maximum speed: 60 km/h (37 mph) maximum road speed forwards or reverse

The Stridsvagn 103 (Strv 103), also known as the Alternative S and S-tank, is a Swedish Cold War–era main battle tank, designed and manufactured in Sweden. "Strv" is the Swedish military abbreviation of stridsvagn, Swedish for tank (literally combat wagon, it also is the Swedish word for chariot), while the 103 comes from being the third tank in Swedish service to be equipped with a 10.5 cm gun.

Developed in the 1950s, it was the first main battle tank to use a gas turbine engine and the only mass-produced tank since World War II to not use a turret besides the German Kanonenjagdpanzer, which is not classified as a tank by role, but by design. It has an unconventional design with a unique gun laying process: it is turretless with a fixed gun traversed by engaging the tracks and elevated by adjusting the hull suspension. The result was a very low-profile design with an emphasis on survivability and heightened crew protection level.

Strv 103s formed a major portion of the Swedish armoured forces from the 1960s to the 1990s, when, along with the Centurions, it was replaced by the Leopard 2 variants Stridsvagn 121 and Stridsvagn 122.

While most turretless armoured fighting vehicles are classified as assault guns or tank destroyers, the Strv 103 is considered a tank since its designated combat role matched those of other tanks within contemporary Swedish doctrine.

== History ==
=== Concept development ===
In the early 1950s, the Royal Swedish Army Materiel Administration's Ordnance Department began development of a new tank known as kranvagn, or KRV. The desired features were a weight around 30 tonnes with high gun performance, protection and mobility. The new design emerged with a very low-profile hull with a tall and highly angled turret mounting a large-calibre main gun and autoloader system, reducing the crew to three. 105 to 120 mm guns were initially considered, with the 120 being favoured, and later a 155 mm design was also considered. The overall design is very similar to the French AMX-50.

Around this same time, they also approached the United Kingdom about purchasing the Centurion tank. The Centurion included a gun stabilizer, much better mobility, and a number of other features that made it much more advanced than the KRV. Although the British proved interested, they stated that deliveries could not begin until the 1955 or 56 time-frame, after their own needs were filled. Then, in 1953, due in part to a need for increased foreign currency, the UK offered to deliver the Centurion immediately. This offer was taken up, and KRV work continued only to produce two hulls for study.

While the Centurion was a great advance on the KRV, it was still considered much heavier than ideal given its firepower. In the mid-1950s, the Royal Swedish Army Materiel Administration's Ordnance Department put out a contract to find a replacement. Two working groups were formed to consider different approaches. "Alternative A" (for "Anglo-American") was to purchase a design from either the British or Americans of roughly 50 tons but mounting a more powerful gun than the Ordnance QF 20-pounder of the existing Centurions. "Alternative T" ("Tysk-Fransk", or "German-French") was for a lighter tank of around 30 tons with less protection but better mobility. In 1956, Sven Berge of the Swedish Arms Administration proposed "Alternative S" ("S" standing for "Swedish"), a radically different solution.

=== Alternative S ===
As part of the Centurion purchase, the UK had supplied volumes of data from World War II and Korean War tank engagements. These demonstrated that a full half of all "kills" were due to hits on the turret or the turret ring. Hits on the lower portion of the tank were much more rare. These statistics also suggested that the chance of being hit was strongly related to the overall height of the tank.

In 1943, Berge had read reports of the 1940 French Char B1 design. This featured a large (for the era) gun in the hull that was fixed in azimuth, and required the entire tank to turn to aim it. This was accomplished through the use of a complex transmission system under the gunner's control. Berge had also been part of the teams that examined German vehicles after the war, and was aware of the ability for short vehicles to quickly maneuver.

Berge combined these concepts for the S proposal. The suspension would be connected to a stabilizer from Bofors that would keep the entire tank stabilized as opposed to just the gun. He felt the stabilizers of the era did not offer the performance needed for real fire-on-the-move; while a first shot may be made on the move, the tanks generally stopped for follow-up shots. He felt that the advantage offered was limited, and that better protection when stopped would be more useful.

The resulting chassis was quite small, with only four road wheels, and the gun extended through the vehicle to the rear where the autoloader and ammunition was stored outside of the crew compartment. The resulting 30 ton design offered the same level of armour as the heavy tanks, but was better protected overall due to the external ammunition and very low profile.

=== Prototypes ===
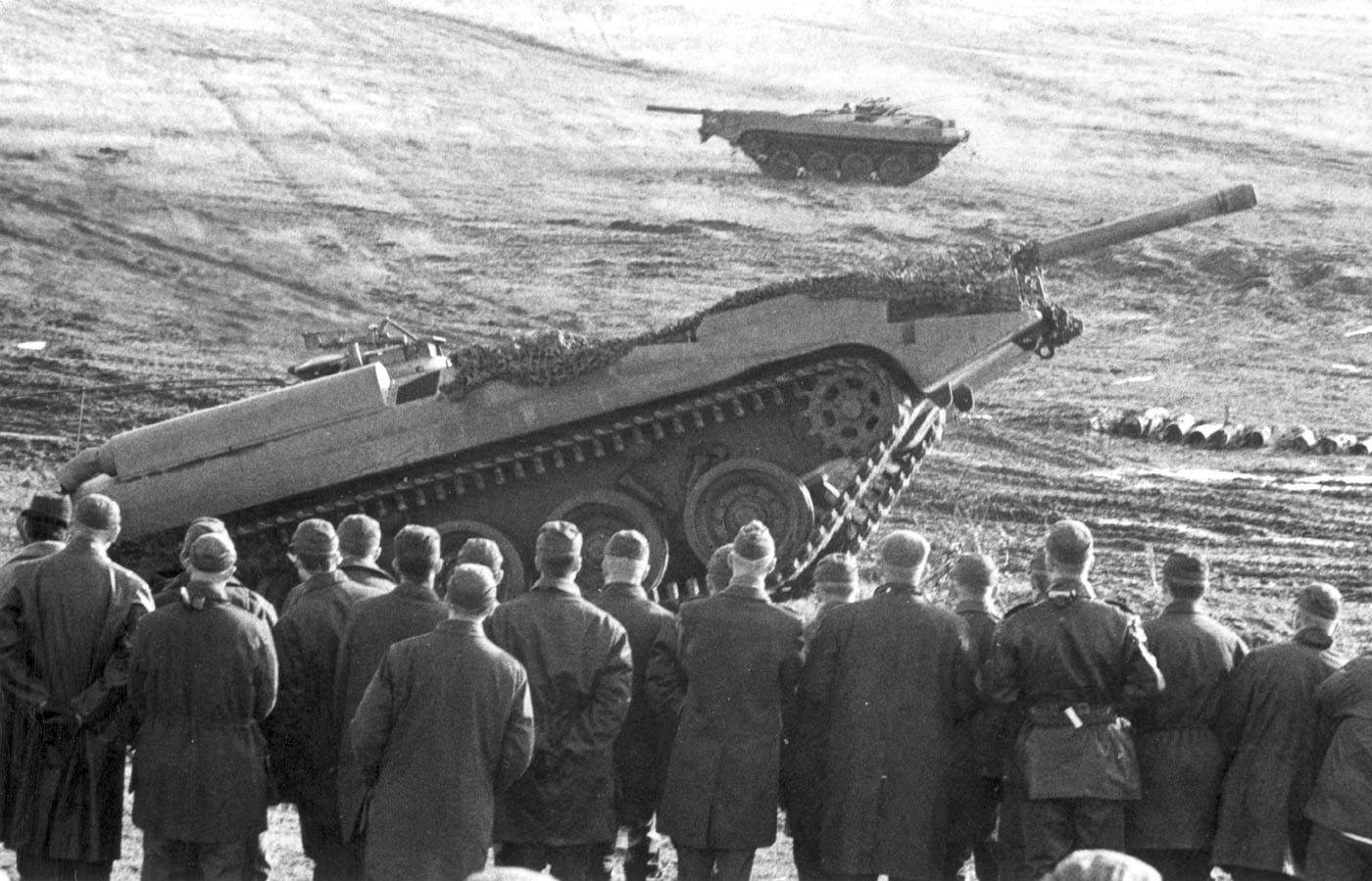
Tank mobility trials in 1966

A spring 1957 meeting to consider the various designs resulted in "S" raising enough interest that a demonstration of its design features was needed. A small contract was let to demonstrate that the suspension system could be used for aiming. This led to experiments using a surplus M4 Sherman and Infanterikanonvagn 103 vehicles fit with external systems that moved the suspension. These seemed promising, so one of the test hulls from the earlier KRV program was adapted for more rigorous testing and the first application of the stabilizer. This was later modified to remove the first and sixth road wheels to make a layout with greater similarity to the S proposal.

As part of the Försvarsbeslut 1958 (defence plan of 1958) deliberations, the Riksdagen (Swedish parliament) debated the three Alternatives. S would be the most expensive, but it was ultimately selected for the symbolic value of a domestic tank in a neutral country, as well as the spin-off effects on Swedish industrial competence. On 4 February 1958, a contract was released for two prototype hulls, S1 and S2. Volvo was selected to build the engine system and AB Landsverk the drive trains. S1 used an electric motor for power, supplied by a generator trailer, and was used to test the suspension system. S2 included the Volvo-designed Diesel-turbine hybrid engine and was used to test the drivetrain and flotation system. These were also successful, and in 1960, an order was placed for ten pre-production vehicles.

By this time, the UK had offered the latest Centurion Mk. 10, which featured the famed Royal Ordnance L7 105 mm gun. The gun had been licensed for production in Sweden and would be available shortly, so the decision was made to replace the much larger guns originally conceived with the 105 in order to save development costs. For the S, it was lengthened to L/62 from the original L/52 to allow more powerful charges to be used. Because the gun was fixed in place, with no recoil movement, the autoloader was able to reach a very high rate of firing every three seconds. This led to the production design being given the name "Stridsvagn 103", meaning the third design mounting a 10 cm gun.

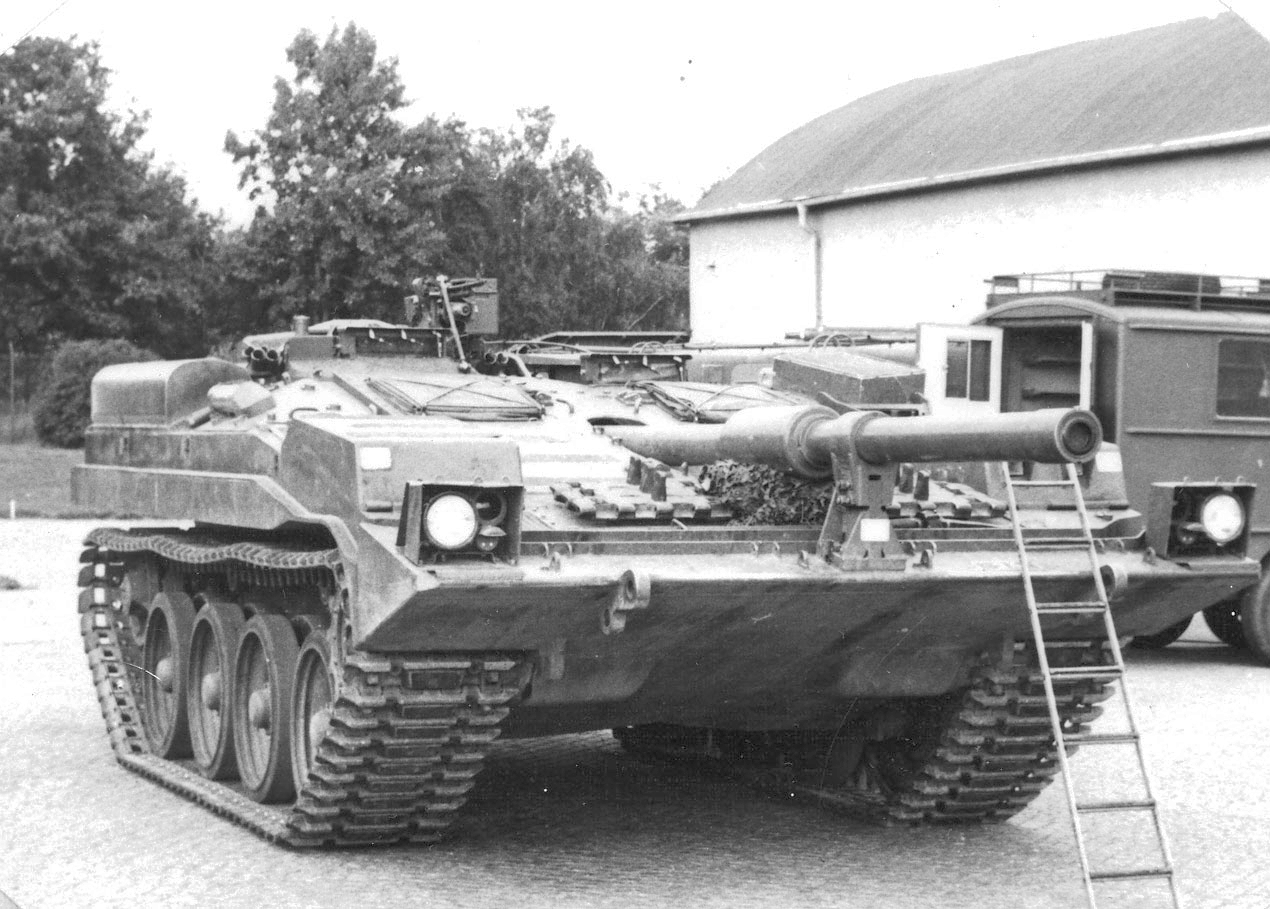
An early production vehicle in 1967

The first of these "zero series" vehicles arrived in 1963. During testing, it was noticed that while a two-man crew could operate the vehicle successfully, other tasks became more difficult. Notably, it made operating in the field more difficult because a two-man crew was not enough to perform guard duty or easily perform track maintenance or reloading ammunition. The decision was made to add a third member, assigning them to operate the radios as well as having a second set of controls and vision systems to allow them to drive the tank in reverse at high speed.

The vehicle was first shown to the public in the spring of 1963. It was an immediate worldwide sensation. John F Kennedy expressed an interest in the design, leading to a memo by Robert S McNamara noting:

Their new tank has advantages over our M60 in its low silhouette, lighter weight and amphibious capability. On the other hand, it is incapable of concurrent automotive movement and all-around engagement of targets. While the Army fully recognizes the advantages in the Swedish design, it considers this new tank to be more nearly a defensive tank destroyer or assault gun rather than a tank within the Army's concept of employment of tanks.

=== Into production ===
The zero-series success led to a fall 1964 production order for 70 examples. The first production examples began to arrive in 1967. These demonstrated that the original 300 horsepower (220 kW) Boeing T50 turbine was underpowered, and a new 490 horsepower (370 kW) design from Caterpillar was introduced for the second production batch, the 220 S103B models, which began to arrive in 1970. These engines were retrofit to the earlier examples as well. The production of 290 production models was complete by 1971.

=== Later updates ===
Plans during the 1970s called for new tanks to be introduced in the 1980s, but these were later pushed back to the 1990s. This led to a round of improvements for the S103's in service, producing the S103C. The changes were to replace the 240 horsepower (180 kW) Rolls-Royce K60 with the 290 horsepower (220 kW) Detroit Diesel Series 92, new tracks from Diehl Aerospace, external fuel tanks along the sides of the vehicle, a laser rangefinder, and the addition of the dozer blades to all of the tanks, instead of every third vehicle. Conversions began in 1986 and were complete by 1988.

There was some development of a S103D model carried out in the 1990s. Yet another turbine was used, along with a nuclear biological chemical filter system, a new ballistic calculator able to fire on moving targets, a muzzle reference system, better damping of the suspension, improved frontal armor and a separate stabilizer for the commander's machine gun. By this time the newer foreign tanks were selected for purchase and the D-series modifications were not carried out.

== Design ==
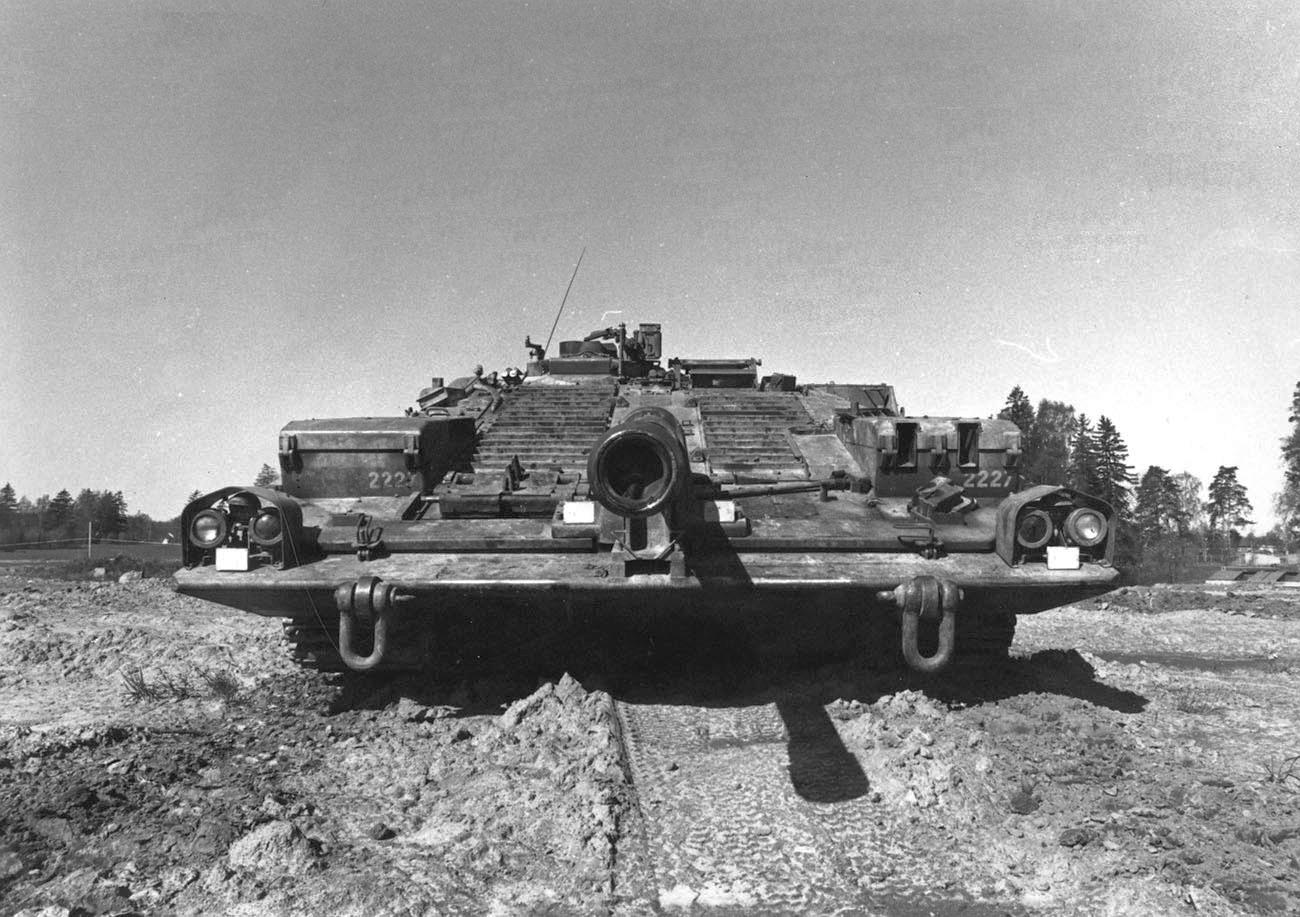
The Strv 103 in a "hull down" position presents a very low profile compared to conventional, turreted tank designs.

Studies of casualty reports from World War II and the Korean War revealed that the risk of being hit in combat was strongly related to height, with more than half of tank losses being the result of the turret being penetrated. Berge therefore concluded that any new design should be as low as possible. The radical solution was to eliminate the turret, which would also dispose of a vulnerable target area and make the tank much lighter. In terms of absolute height, the final design did not give the Strv 103 any significant advantage over its most likely opponent, the T-62. The latter was just slightly taller with 2.20 m (7 ft 3 in) in height with its turret versus the 2.14 m (7 ft 0 in) of the Strv 103. On the other hand, the Swedish Centurions towered over both with their 2.94 m (9 ft 8 in) – 3.01 m (9 ft 11 in) in height. However, the T-62 paid for its low profile with an extremely cramped interior and lack of gun depression. Tanks are often deployed in hull-down firing positions, either behind dug entrenchments or using the crest of a hill, in order to reduce the exposure of the vehicle to enemy fire. In this firing position, the level of exposure is determined by the distance between the bottom of the gun barrel and the top of the turret or vehicle, and the angle to which the vehicle is able to depress the gun barrel. Since the Strv 103 orients the entire tank to depress and elevate the barrel, in a hull down position it has very little apparent height and subsequent visual profile to the enemy. It could also lower the hull a further 13 centimetres (5.1 in) by adjusting the suspension.

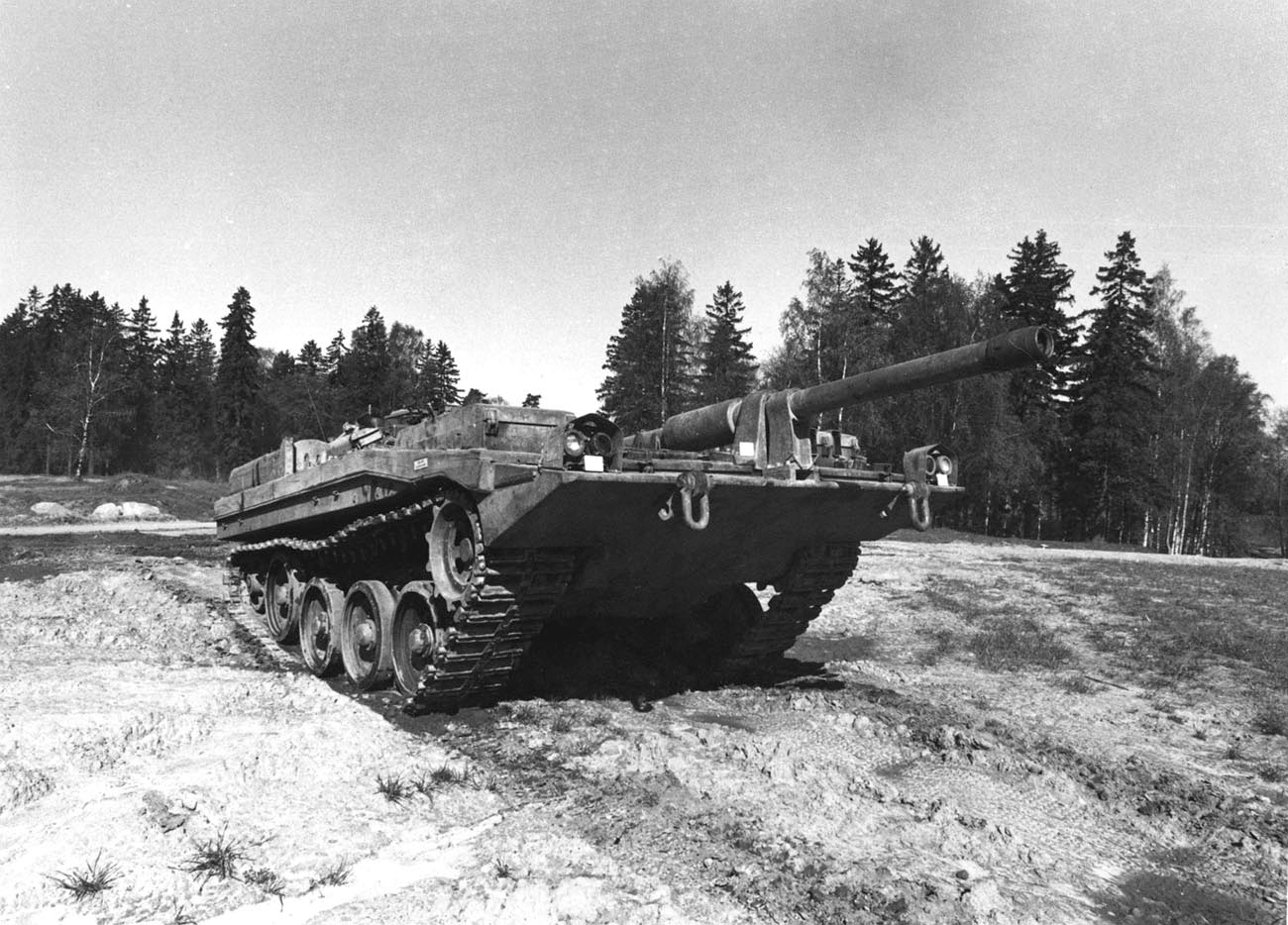
Strv 103 demonstrating its hydropneumatic suspension system and gun elevation

Being familiar with both the French Char B1's precision transmission, the exceptional turning performance of the short tracked assault guns, and the combat performance of the German StuG and Jagdpanzer series inspired Berge's design to solve the aiming problem through the use of a fully automated transmission and suspension system, which precisely turned and tilted the tank under the gunner's control. The gun itself would be fixed to the hull. This made it impossible to use a stabilised gun. As a result, the tank could not accurately move and fire at the same time, but the Swedish experience with Centurions suggested that, in order for tanks to reach acceptable accuracy, they would need to come to a halt anyway, and erroneously estimated that no breakthrough in stabilisation technology was likely within the foreseeable future.

Other features of the tank were also quite radical. The rifled gun, a Bofors 105 mm L74 with a barrel length of 62 Calibers, was able to use the same ammunition as the British Royal Ordnance L7, and would be equipped with an autoloader allowing a rate of fire of one round every three seconds, also allowing the crew to be reduced to two; a gunner/driver and the commander (most designs of the era used a crew of four), with one person being able to handle all functions of the tank from the ordinary position due to duplicate controls. This would of course only be used in emergencies, as the workload would be overwhelming, but apart from providing redundancy it also allowed the crew to shift tasks between them as situation required. The concept went through practical tests, that quickly revealed that a two-man crew would not be self-sufficient when considering the many tasks not directly related to handling the tank: in particular, routine maintenance, bivouacking, track-changes and reloading in field. While the last issue could have been solved by adding staff to the ammunition crews, it was decided that a third crew-member was needed. To enhance combat effectiveness, the third man was to be assigned as a rear driver/radio operator, facing the rear of the tank and equipped with a complete setup for driving. This allowed the tank to be driven backwards at the same speed as forwards, keeping its frontal armour pointed at the enemy, while relieving the commander of routine radio duty. The commander and gunner/driver both had the same set of sights and controls to fire the gun and drive the tank.

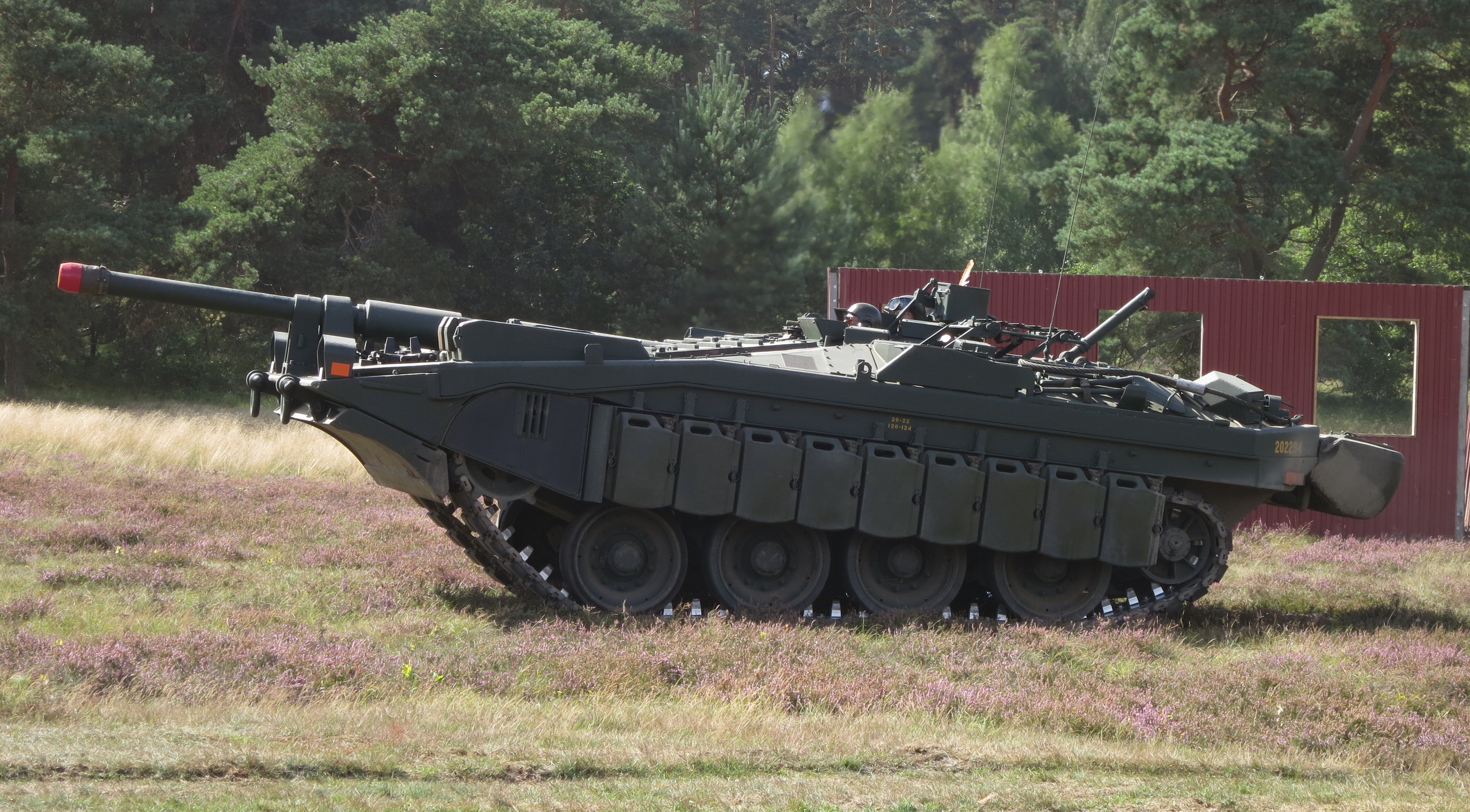
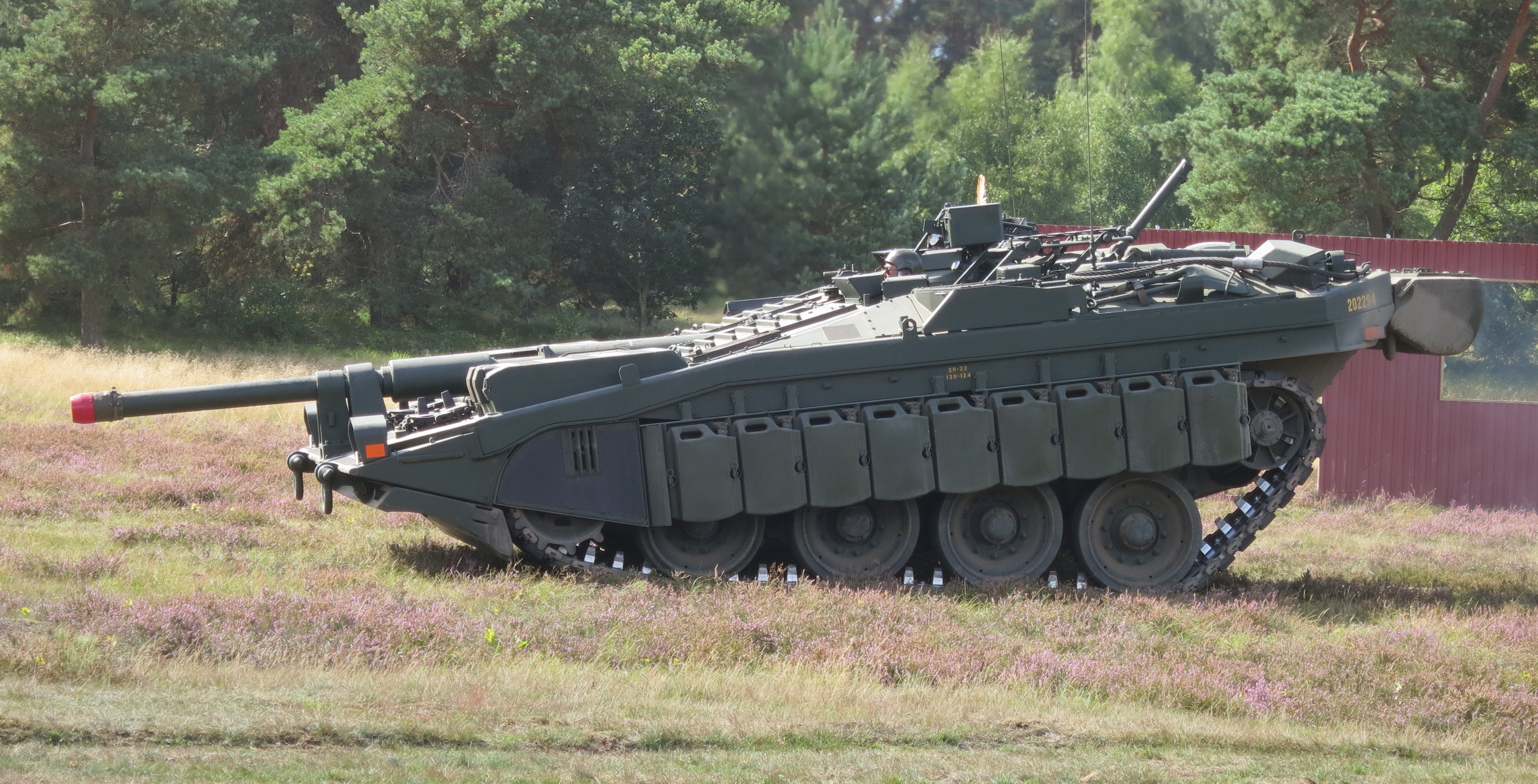
A Stridsvagn 103C demonstrates gun elevation and depression using suspension, Revingehed, Sweden, 2013.

The tank was uniquely powered by two different kind of engines, a 240 horsepower (180 kW) Rolls-Royce K60 opposed-piston diesel for slow cruising and manoeuvring the tank in aiming, and a 300 horsepower (220 kW) Boeing 502 turbine for more power when travelling at higher speed or in severe terrain. The turbine was quickly found to be underpowered, and was replaced by a Caterpillar turbine delivering 490 horsepower (370 kW) after no more than 70 tanks had been produced, and retrofitted to all previous vehicles. This was the first use of a turbine engine in a production tank; the Soviet T-80 and US M1 Abrams would later be built with gas turbines for main propulsion. The concept was interesting enough that Bofors was asked to build a prototype of the suspension/drive train, which they completed successfully.

The Strv 103 could be made fully amphibious. A flotation screen could be erected around the upper hull in about 20 minutes, and the tracks would drive the tank at about 6 kilometres per hour (3.7 mph) in water.

One tank in each platoon was fitted with a dozer blade under the front hull, which was from outside the tank manually dropped and locked into working position with pins and support struts. The blade allowed it to do simple engineering tasks, like digging fire pits for the platoon, filling trenches for ease of passage and so forth. Once the task was completed, the blade was again manually returned to the position under the front hull and locked in place. Upon the introduction of the 103C model all tanks had a bulldozer blade fitted, both to speed up operations and for the increased protection of the lower hull.

== Service ==
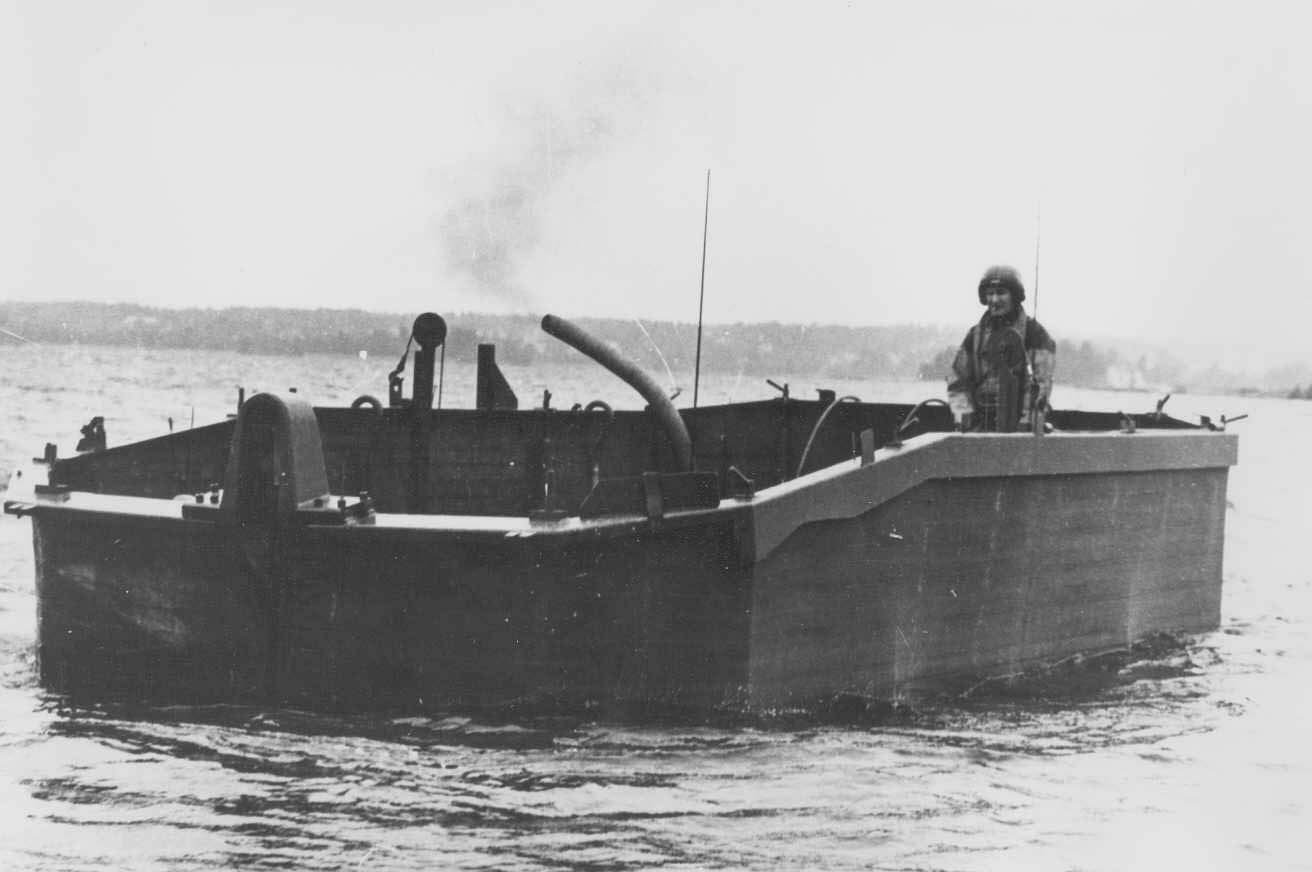
The Strv 103 demonstrating its amphibious capabilities with the help of flotation screens

In preparation for the defence plan of 1958 (Försvarsbeslut 1958 (FB58)) in Riksdagen (Swedish parliament), the procurement set Alternativ S against the two foreign alternatives Alternativ A and Alternativ T. While the domestic alternative was going to be more expensive, the defence committee report recommended "S" when weighing in the symbolic value of a domestic tank for a neutral country as well as the spin-off effects on Swedish industrial competence.

Riksdagen made the formal decision regarding FB58 on 4 February 1958, and a follow-on contract called for two production prototypes, which were completed in 1961. By this point, the army was so satisfied with the design that an initial pre-production order for 10 was placed in 1960.

With minor changes, the Alternativ S was adopted as the Stridsvagn 103 ("103" from being the third tank with a 10 cm calibre gun accepted into Swedish service). Full production started in 1967 and ended in 1971 with 290 delivered. The changes included a new gyro-stabilised commander's cupola armed with a 7.62 mm KSP 58 machine gun, and upgraded frontal armour. A unique slat armor grid could be mounted at the front to help defeat high-explosive anti-tank (HEAT) rounds; however, it was kept secret for many years and was to be fitted only in the event of war.

Despite its design, the Strv 103 was intended for offensive operations. The armoured brigades of the Swedish Army, which operated the Strv 103, were designated anfallsbrigader (assault brigades) and tasked with launching counter-offensives on enemy beachheads and airborne landings. The stated Swedish armoured doctrine contemporary to the tank describes an aggressive approach to armoured warfare, even in defensive situations. The design of the Strv 103, with its low profile, was based on protection rather than defensive battlefield behaviour.

In 1980, the Swedish Army requested all tanks in the inventory to be scrapped and replaced with an unspecified Stridsvagn 2000 (tank for usage past year 2000). In 1982, the Riksdag decided for severe reduction of the military budget in Defence Act of 1982, and instead decided the tank-fleet should go through a renovation and modification (REMO) to at least somewhat bring them up to standard while within the economic limits imposed.

== Performance ==
The Stridsvagn 103 never saw combat and so its design remains unproven. However, for its intended role in the 1960s, it had numerous advantages. In 1967, Norway carried out a two-week comparative observation test with the Leopard 1 and found that, with closed hatches, the 103 spotted more targets and fired faster than the Leopard while the situation was reversed when operating with hatches open. In April to September 1968, two 103s were tested at the British armour school in Bovington, which reported that "the turretless concept of the "S"-tank holds considerable advantage over turreted tanks". In 1973, the BAOR tested the 103. British crewmen received six weeks training and the vehicles were serviced by Swedish engineers. Over nine days of manoeuvres alongside the Chieftain tank, availability never fell under 90% and the final report stated, "It has not been possible to prove any disadvantage in the "S" inability to fire on the move." In 1975, two 103s were tested at the American armour center at Fort Knox. The trial demonstrated that the 103 fired more accurately than the M60A1E3, but on an average of 0.5 seconds slower. In the late 90s, a wargame was held in Kvarn pitting 7 Strv 103s in a defensive position against an equal amount of Strv 121s (Leopard 2). All seven Strv 121s were knocked out while only one 103 was lost.

In comparison with the Centurion, the shorter track of the Strv 103 meant it performed worse on soft ground (mud and snow), and its trench taking and vertical obstacle capabilities were also significantly lower: where the Centurion climbed a 100 cm wall, the 103 was barely able to climb an 80 cm wall. On hard terrain, the 103 on the other hand was far more manoeuvrable.

== Variants ==
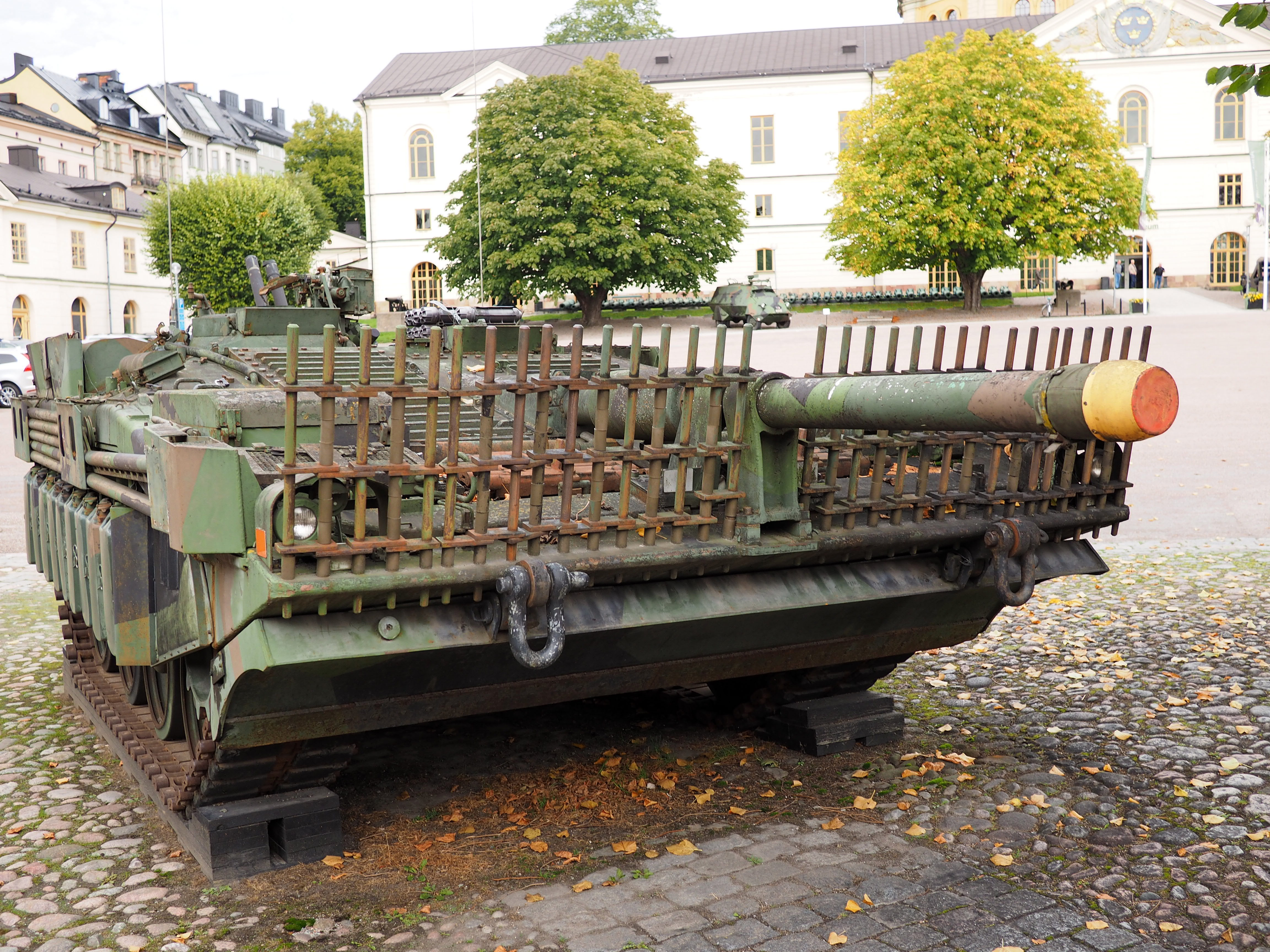
Strv 103C at the Swedish Army Museum, Stockholm, with anti-HEAT slat armor on the front

Stridsvagn 103B
As the weight of the Strv 103 had increased compared to the pre-production tanks, the 103 turned out to be under-powered. Hence, a more powerful version of the same gas turbine, manufactured by Caterpillar, was introduced after the first production run of 80 tanks. The early version tanks (retroactively designated Strv 103A) were soon upgraded to B-standard. Adjustments to the hydro-pneumatic suspension increased elevation range from −10 through +12 degrees, to −11 through +16 degrees.
Stridsvagn 103C
An upgrade programme was started in 1986 to fit all vehicles with improved fire control systems. Also, each Strv 103 was fitted with a dozer blade, rather than just one per platoon. A further upgrade in 1987/88 replaced the Rolls-Royce engine with a newer 290 horsepower (220 kW) Detroit Diesel with more fuel cans placed along the sides to function as applique armour, and added a new laser rangefinder.

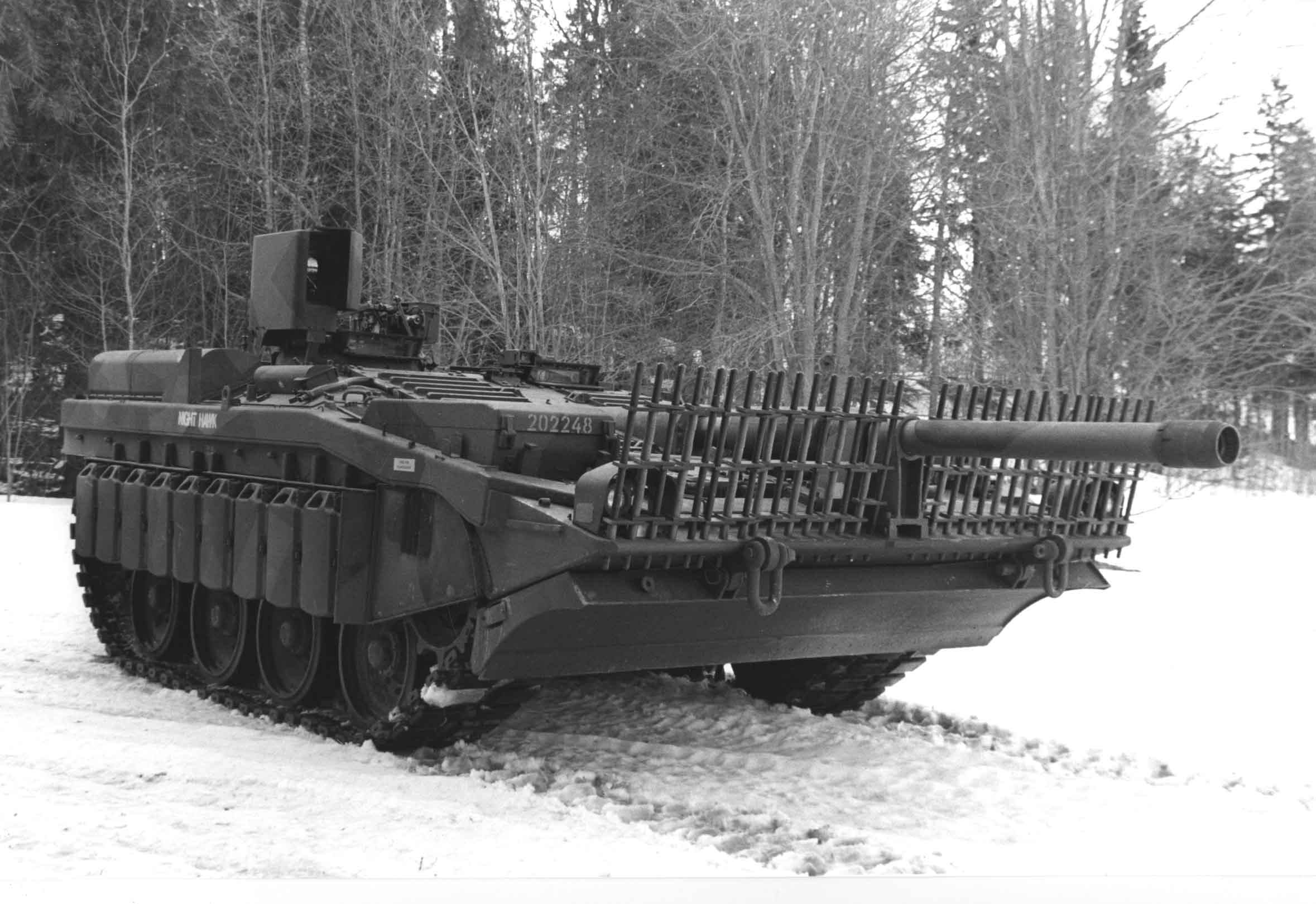
The proposed Strv 103D upgrade

Stridsvagn 103D
In the mid-1990s, as the Swedish Armed Forces were looking for a new main battle tank, one Strv 103C was upgraded into the Strv 103D. The major changes were the installation of fire-control computer, thermal viewers for both the gunner and the commander, allowing the crew to fight at night-time and in bad weather conditions, and the installation of passive light enhancers for driving. Some minor changes to the suspension system and engine were also made. There was some consideration of adding both reactive and/or appliqué armour in the early 1990s, but, in the end, the Strv 103 was instead phased out of Swedish service in favour of the Stridsvagn 121 (leased Leopard 2A4s were used as a stop-gap measure), which entered service in 1997 (the last year that the Strv 103 was used to train tank crews). This prototype was used during the trials for the new main battle tank system for the Swedish Armed Forces alongside all the other tanks tested. For a few years this prototype was even tested under remote control. The sole Strv 103D is today on display at the Arsenalen national military vehicle museum, together with some 103C models. They are all still in running order.

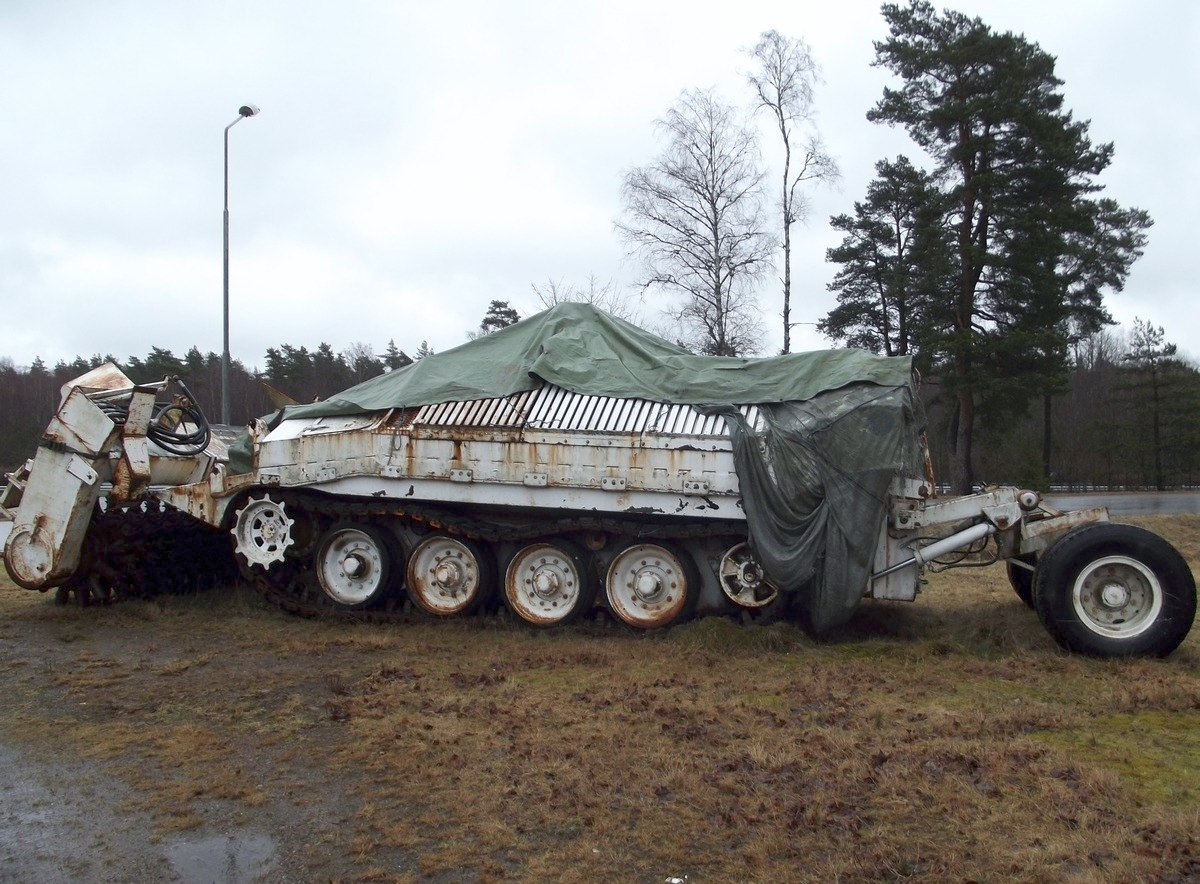
MV 103C Deminer.

Minvält 103C
The MV 103C Deminer was a minesweeper vehicle based on the 103C tank. The project was discontinued in 1997.

15,5 cm bandkanon 1
Self-propelled howitzer developed from Strv 103 chassis.

== Tanks on display ==
The following exhibitions possess an S-tank on display:

Sweden:

- Försvarsmuseum Boden, Boden through Föreningen P5
- Försvarsfordonsmuseet Arsenalen, Härad, Sweden
- Swedish Army Museum, Stockholm
- Beredskapsmuseet, Helsingborg

Denmark:

- Aalborg Forsvars- og Garnisonmuseum

Germany:

- German Tank Museum (Deutsches Panzermuseum Munster)

UK:

- The Tank Museum, Bovington

Australia:

- Royal Australian Armoured Corps Memorial and Army Tank Museum

France:

- Musée des Blindés, Saumur

Russia:

- Kubinka Tank Museum

Belgium:

- Gunfire Museum, Brasschaat

USA

- Fort Benning, Georgia US

== See also ==
- Combined diesel and gas
- FV4401 Contentious: air-portable tank destroyer with gun-elevation through hydraulic suspension.
- VT tank: German turret-less MBT-project.

=== Tanks of comparable role, performance and era ===
- AMX-30: French main battle tank
- Chieftain: British main battle tank
- Leopard 1: German main battle tank
- M60 Patton: American main battle tank
- T-62: Soviet main battle tank
- T-64: Soviet main battle tank
- T-72: Soviet main battle tank
- TR-85: Romanian main battle tank
- Type 69/79: Chinese main battle tank
- Type 74: Japanese main battle tank
- Vijayanta: Indian main battle tank

== Sources ==
- "Stridsvagn 103 S (E1995.105)". Bovington Tank Museum vehicle collection. tankmuseum.org.
- Stridsvagn 103 S (E1995.105) at The Tank Museum
- Historien bakom Stridsvagn 103 "S" (in Swedish)
