= Sven Berge =

Swedish tank designer (1919–2004)

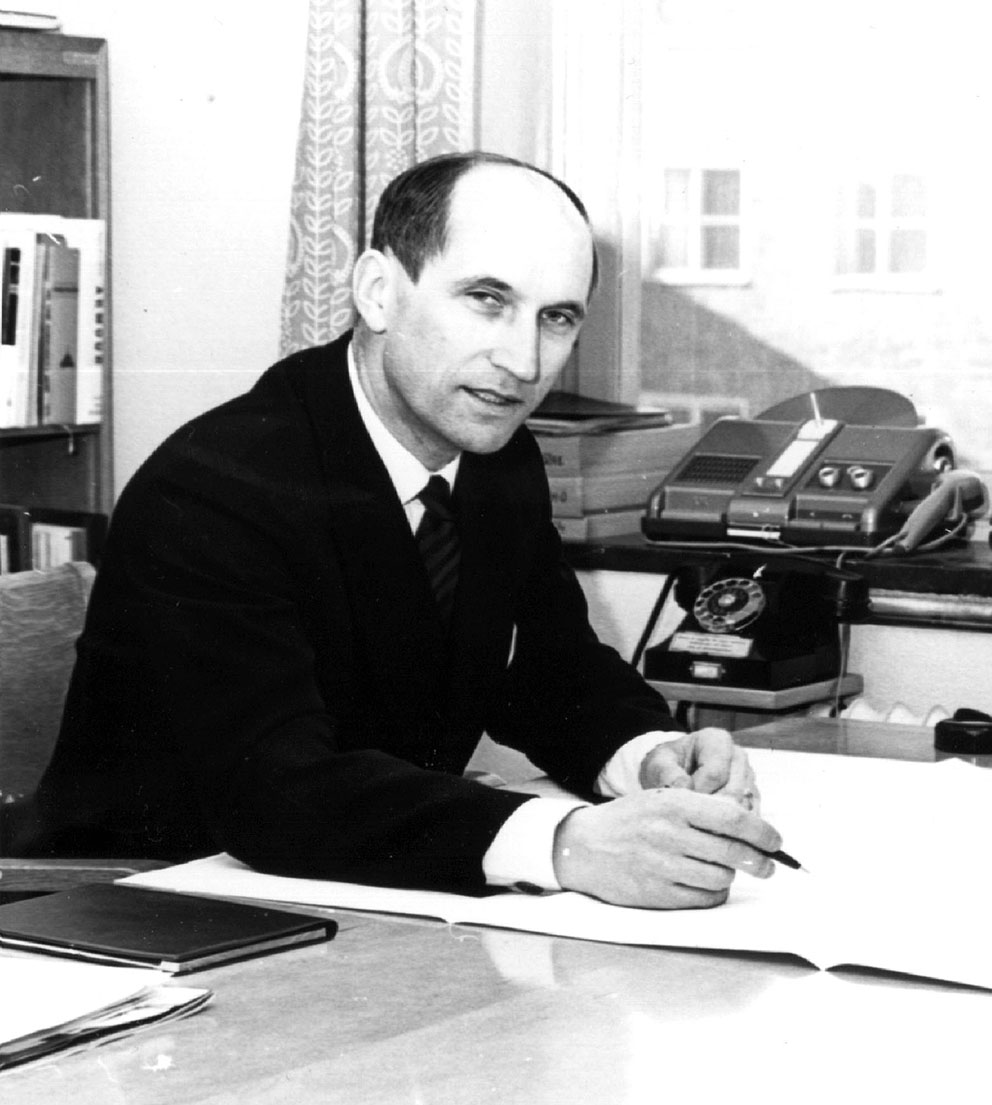
Sven Berge at his desk at KAT F

Sven Erik Berge (born Svensson, 1 October 1919 in Ljusdal, Hälsingland, Sweden; died 6 August 2004 in Malmö) was a Swedish gymnasium-graduate in mechanical engineering, most known for his time at the Royal Swedish Army Materiel Administration's Ordnance Department (later the Defence Materiel Administration), where he led the construction of the Stridsvagn 74 and Stridsvagn 103, but also as a member of the Royal Swedish Academy of War Sciences since the early 1960s.

== Biography ==
Sven Berge began his career during the summer of 1936 with an internship at Johansson & C:o Mekaniska Verkstad in Ljusdal, doing engine repairs and other mechanical-related tasks. From the autumn 1936 to the summer of 1937, he was an intern at Nydqvist & Holm AB in Trollhättan, assembling engines. The summer of 1939 he did his last internship at the sales department of AB Atlas-Diesel in Stockholm, responsible for delivery control and statistics. The same year, he began his compulsory military service. Berge graduated in mechanical engineering from Maskintekniska linjen at Örebro gymnasium in 1940.

On his birthday 1943, Berge was commissioned as fänrik of the Reserve after completing "reservofficersaspirantskola för infanteriets pansarförband" (Reserve officer aspirant-school for the infantry's armoured units) at I 9 in 1941 and "pansartruppernas reservofficersskola" ( Swedish Armoured Troops reserve officershool at I 10 in 1942. State of readiness-service lasted nine months and was carried out at I 9 as squad- and 2nd platoon leader somewhere between summer of 1941 and the end of 1944. On 1 December 1942, Berge was employed by Kontrollbyrån at Tygavdelningen på Kungliga Arméförvaltningen (KAF T) (Inspection bureau in the Material&Supply department of the Royal Swedish Army Materiel Administration) in a so called unified service, which meant he parallel was a civil servant at KAF and officer in the armed forces. This allowed him to continue as instructor and teacher for various armoured units when the work as inspector of tank production left some time to spare. In the task as inspector was included to solve various technical problems related to armoured vehicles, something he did by his own initiative: early 1943 he wrote about using overpressure as protection against chemical weapons, the year after a suggestion regarding improved wading capabilities for stridsvagn m/40 was written. By 1945, Berge had advanced from assistant inspector to executive for grupp Pansarfordon (group Armoured vehicles) at the delivery section in Stockholm.

In the beginning of the 1950s, Berge was involved both in the evaluation of AMX-13 preceding a planned purchase of some 300-400 tanks (aborted in 1953 when the English changed their position and offered direct delivery of the Centurion), and the meticulous pre-studies for a new domestic tank. Especially the effects in actual combat were scrutinised: where did the hits strike, what damage did they cause, and how did it affect vehicles and crews. Although the Centurion was an excellent tank, a lighter, more numerous tank was also needed to support the infantry with direct fire. Since the purchase from France was cancelled, another solution was required. Sven Berge suggested that the anti-air guns (7,5 cm luftvärnskanon m/36 and m/37)) that no longer were adequate for their role was to be used to modernise the outdated stridsvagn m/42. In 1954, he was appointed project manager for the modernisation, given two m/42 to validate his suggestions. The problem with the long barrels causing the guns to be heavy on the nose was solved in a typical manner: gigantic Swiss clock-springs formed the basis of a balancing mechanism. Thus some 225 stridsvagn 74 was ordered, and delivered between 1957 and 1960. Sven Berge had by then already moved on to the construction that would make him famous and result in stridsvagn 103. In August 1956, his section manager Höglund and the Chief of Fordonsbyrån (the Vehicle bureau of KAFT) Eric Gillner was presented the basic concept. 22 October 1956, "Notification of a Swedish invention" was filed, where the technical solution for gun laying using the tank's tracks was detailed.

During the 1970s, Sven Berge was the chairman in a study group within the project Underlag Direkt Eld (UDES) (Base data Direct Fire), that studied concepts and innovations concerning tanks and other combat vehicles.

Besides Swedish and English, Berge was also fluent in French, German and Russian, which certainly facilitated his constant reading and translation of specialist literature concerning combat vehicles and related technology.

After his retirement as senior chief engineer and head of the Study- and development section at Stridsfordonsbyrån (Combat vehicle bureau), Försvarets Materielverk, in 1984, Sven Berge opened his own consultant firm in Malmö, named "Swedish Armour". He also participated in the "Technical Advisory Group”, at General Dynamics Land Systems in Detroit together with his personal friends Philip W Lett and general Israel Tal.

Sven Berge was buried on 17 August 2004 in Sankt Pauli kyrka, Malmö.

== Sources ==
=== Main source ===
Where not specifically stated otherwise, the article is based on

- (in Swedish) Rickard O. Lindström; et al. (31 July 2014). "Sven Berge in memorian" (in Swedish). Rickard O. Lindström, ointres.se/pansar. Archived from the original on 29 March 2016.
