= L74 =

Swedish 105 mm tank gun

Bofors L74
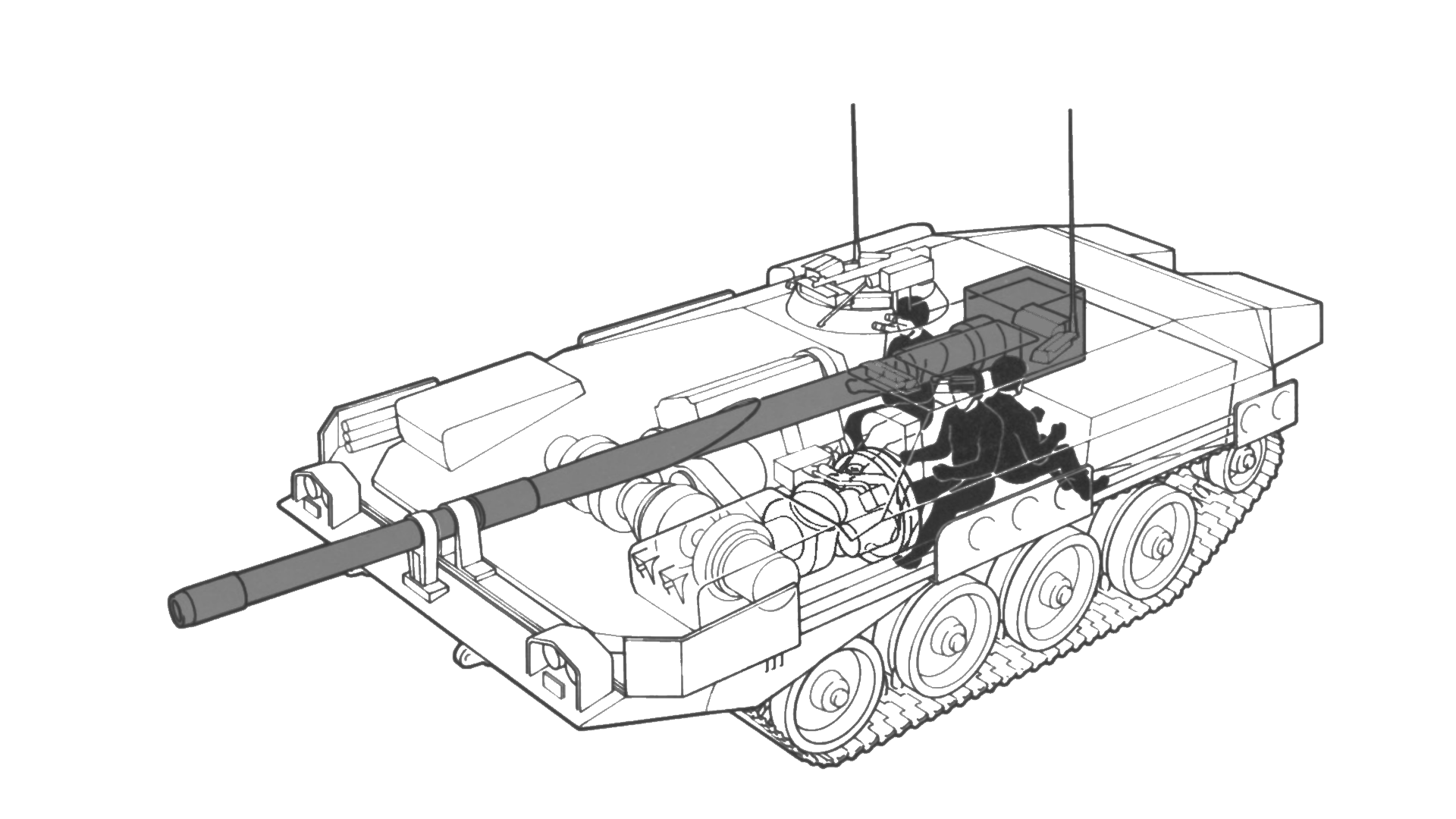
- Schematic illustration of the Bofors L74 gun installation inside the Strv 103 hull.
- Type: Tank gun
- Place of origin: Sweden

Service history
- In service: 1967-1997
- Used by: Sweden

Production history
- Designer: Bofors
- Manufacturer: Bofors

Specifications
- Mass: 1713 kg
- Length: 6.51 metres (21.4 ft)
- Shell: 105×617mmR
- Caliber: 105 millimetres (0.344 ft)
- Barrels: 1
- Breech: Vertical sliding wedge
- Recoil: 240 mm (normal); 250 mm (maximum)
- Sights: Jungner OPS-1 binocular periscopic sight

The Bofors L74 is a Swedish 105 mm rifled tank gun developed specifically for the Stridsvagn 103, a turretless main battle tank. The gun was designed to be integrated into the vehicle's fixed superstructure in conjunction with an automatic loading system.

== History ==
The development of the Strv 103's main armament was part of the Swedish Stridsvagn S programme, which sought to develop a turretless main battle tank with a fixed gun and an automatic loading system. Bofors was responsible for the development of the vehicle's main armament and its associated loading mechanism.

The L74 was designed around a 105 mm calibre and featured a longer barrel than conventional 105 mm tank guns of the period. Its integration into the Strv 103 required a dedicated breech mechanism, mounted in an upside-down configuration to accommodate the automatic loading system, as well as associated loading and extraction mechanisms.

== Additional specifications ==
Characteristic	Specification
Calibre	105 mm
Ammunition	105×617mmR NATO
Barrel length	6,510 mm
Barrel length (calibres)	L/62
Number of rifling grooves	28
Rifling depth	1.15 mm
Rifling width	7.9 mm
Rifling twist	1 turn in 18 calibres
Breech mechanism	Vertical sliding wedge
Normal recoil length	240 mm
Maximum recoil length	250 mm
Minimum recoil length for cartridge case ejection	110 mm
Barrel weight	900 kg
Breech ring weight	41 kg
Rear assembly weight (excluding mechanism)	512 kg
Breech block weight	50 kg

== Sources ==
- Strv 103: Beskrivning del 2 – Data, konstruktion och funktion: Vapen (in Swedish). Bofors. 10 June 1970. pp. 5–20, 21–44.
