= Comet (tank) =

British cruiser tank

Tank, Cruiser, Comet I (A34)
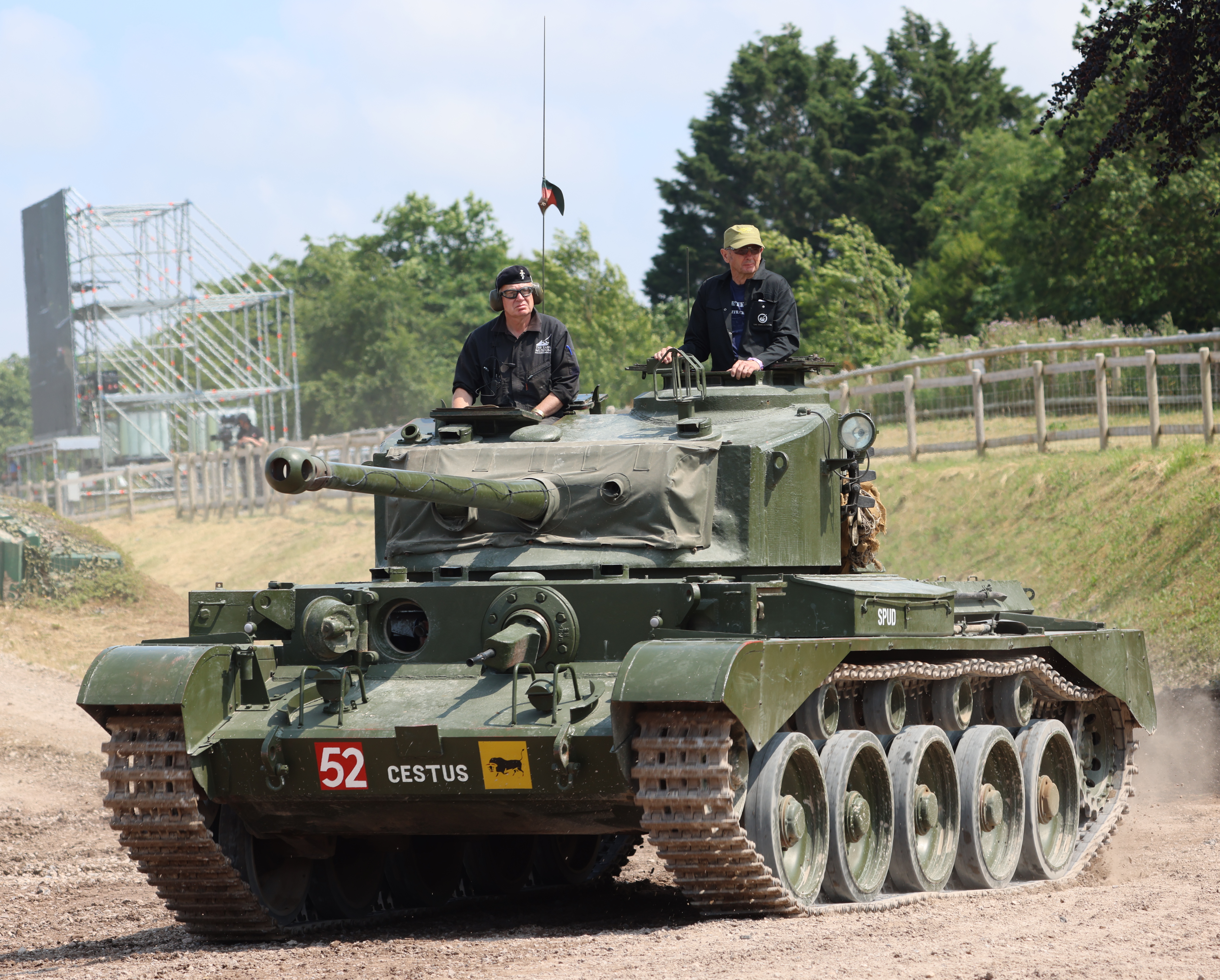
- A Comet tank at Tankfest 2023 at The Tank Museum.
- Type: Cruiser tank
- Place of origin: United Kingdom

Service history
- In service: December 1944–1958 (UK)
- Used by: see Operators
- Wars: Second World War; 1964 Ethiopian–Somali War

Production history
- Designer: Birmingham Carriage & Wagon Co
- Designed: 1943
- Manufacturer: Leyland Motors
- Produced: September 1944
- No. built: 1,200

Specifications
- Mass: 35 long tons (36 t; 39 short tons)
- Length: 21 ft (6.40 m) hull; 25 ft 1 1/2 in (7.66 m) Overall with gun forward
- Width: 9 ft 10 1/4 in (3.00 m) (over tracks)
- Height: 8 ft 9 1/2 in (2.68 m)
- Crew: 5 (commander, gunner, loader/operator, driver, hull gunner)
- Armour: 14–101 mm (0.55–3.98 in)
- Main armament: QF 77mm HV (3 in; 76.2 mm); 61 rounds
- Secondary armament: 2 × 7.92 mm Besa machine guns; 5175 rounds
- Engine: Rolls-Royce Meteor Mark III V12 petrol 600 hp (450 kW)
- Power/weight: 18.3 hp/long ton (13.4 kW/t)
- Drive: Webbed & spudded tracks
- Transmission: Merrit-Brown Z5 Constant Mesh; (5 forward; 1 reverse)
- Suspension: Improved Christie with return rollers
- Ground clearance: 18 in (0.46 m)
- Fuel capacity: 116 imp gal (530 L)
- Operational range: On-road – 123 mi (198 km); Cross-country – 74 mi (119 km)
- Maximum speed: On-road – 32.4 mph (52.1 km/h); Cross-country – 14.3 mph (23 km/h)
- References: Chamberlain & Ellis

The Comet tank or Tank, Cruiser, Comet I (A34) was a British cruiser tank that first saw use near the end of the Second World War, during the Western Allied invasion of Germany. The Comet was developed from the earlier Cromwell tank with a lower profile, partly-cast turret which mounted the new 77 mm HV gun. This was a smaller version of the 17 pdr anti-tank gun firing the same 76.2 mm (3") projectiles, albeit with a lighter charge, and was effective against late-war German tanks, including the Panther and Tiger.

The Comet rendered the Cruiser Mk VIII Challenger obsolete and was an interim solution until the completely new design Centurion tank was available. When firing APDS rounds, the 77 mm HV was superior in armour penetration capability to the 75 mm KwK 42 gun of the equivalent Axis tank, the Panther.

The Comet entered active service in January 1945 and remained in British service until 1958. In some cases, Comets sold to other countries continued to operate into the 1980s.

== Design and development ==
=== Background ===
Combat experience against the Germans in the Western Desert Campaign demonstrated to the British many shortcomings with their cruiser tanks. Hence a request was made in 1941 for a new heavy cruiser tank that could achieve battle superiority over German models. For reasons of economy and efficiency, it had to use as many components as possible from the current A15 Mk VI Crusader tank.

The initial designs for the new Cromwell tank evolved into the A24 Mk VII Cavalier tank and the A27L Mk VIII Centaur tank, both powered by the Nuffield Liberty. Design progressed through the Mk VII (A27M) Cromwell, a third parallel development to the Cavalier and Centaur, sharing many of the same characteristics.

Under the newer A27M specification, Cromwell integrated a number of advanced features. The Meteor engine proved to be very reliable and gave the tank good mobility but some problems appeared based on the vehicle's shared heritage and significant jump in engine power. The tank was prone to throwing its tracks if track tension was not maintained properly or if it turned at too high a speed or too sharply. There were also some problems with suspension breakage, partly due to the Cromwell's high speed and it ran through a number of design changes as a result.

The biggest complaint was related to firepower; the Cromwell had originally been designed to carry the 57 mm Ordnance QF 6-pounder, also retrofitted to the Crusader tanks. In combat, these were found to be useful against other tanks but lacking any reasonable high explosive load they were ineffective against anti-tank guns or static emplacements. Prior to the Cromwell entering combat service, the Ordnance QF 75 mm was introduced which equipped the majority of Cromwells, an adapted version of the 6-pounder firing shells from the US 75 mm gun from the Sherman. This offered somewhat lower anti-tank performance than the 6-pounder but its much larger shell provided an effective high explosive load.

Several attempts had been made to further improve firepower by fitting a more powerful gun. In parallel with development of the Cromwell and QF 75 mm gun, a new Vickers High Velocity 75 mm tank gun had been designed but this proved too large for the Cromwell turret ring and left a shortage in offensive anti-tank capability. A prior requirement for a 17-pounder armed tank led to development of the A30 Mk VIII Challenger. Based on the Cromwell, the hull had to be lengthened and a much larger turret set on top to allow a second loader for the 17-pounder, a requirement of the older specification believed necessary for the larger ammunition. The very high turret of the Challenger was considered a liability and this led to experiments with the similar A30 Avenger version, an anti-tank version with an open-top turret.

Conversion of Sherman tanks to the Sherman Firefly (a Sherman tank fitted with the 17-pounder gun) was significantly faster than Challenger production and driven by operational needs of the Normandy invasion, production of Challenger was dropped. Fireflies (and the limited number of Challengers) provided additional firepower to Cromwell and Sherman armed troops. One Firefly would be issued to each troop of Cromwells (giving three Cromwells and one Sherman Firefly). Problems were encountered due to the different maintenance requirements and associated supply complication of two tank models, as well as the performance difference between Cromwell and Sherman and the Sherman's silhouette, even larger than the Challenger. The large size and obvious difference of both Challenger and Firefly made them a priority target for Axis forces.

Recognising that a common low profile vehicle was required to replace the mixed fleet of Cromwell, Challenger and Firefly tanks, a new specification of tank was created. This removed the Challenger's need for a second loader and mounted the newer Vickers High Velocity weapon intended for the Cromwell.

Design work on A34 by Leyland began in early 1943 following confirmation that Leyland would be "design parent" for further development of the Centaur/Cromwell line. Drawing on the lessons of Challenger, the A31, A32 and A33 heavy assault tank projects the first design was produced mid-1943 and a mock-up was ready by September. The hull was based on the Cromwell with a larger turret ring - increased to 64 inches from 57 inches - but without adding an extra section as with Challenger.

=== Tank, Cruiser, Comet l (A34) ===
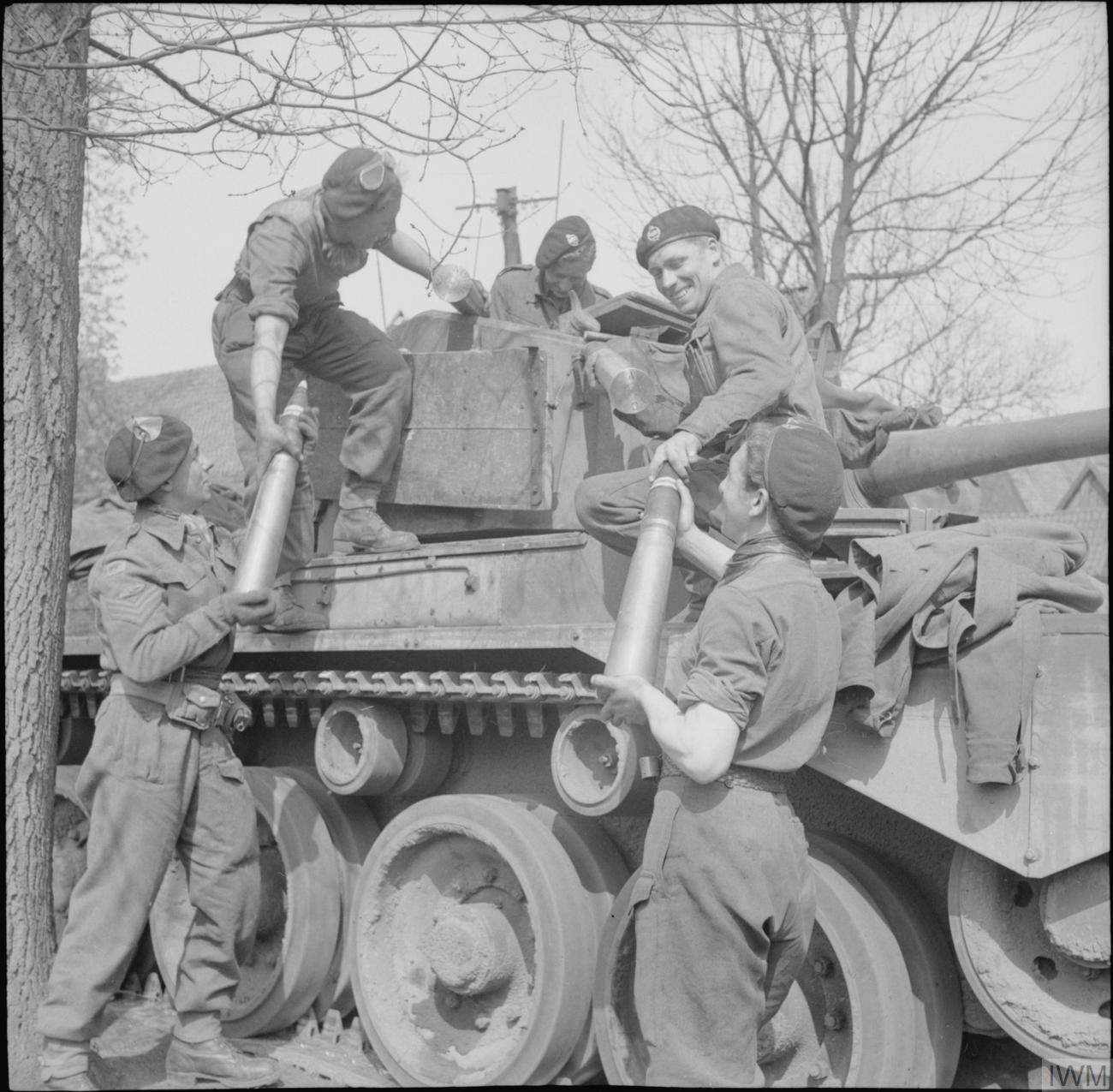
A Comet's crew loading ammunition into their tank.

With the A34 (the General Staff specification), later named Comet, the tank designers opted to correct some of the Cromwell's flaws in armament, track design and suspension while building upon its strengths of low height, high speed and mobility. This replaced the need for the Challenger and Firefly and acted upon the experiences gained through design and early deployment of the Cromwell.

Originally, it had been expected that the Cromwell would use the "High Velocity 75 mm" gun designed by Vickers but it would not fit into the turret. Development of the gun continued and as work commenced on the Comet, the gun design evolved into the 17 pdr HV (High Velocity). The gun now used the same calibre (76.2 mm) projectile as the 17-pounder but the cartridge case was from the older QF 3 inch 20 cwt anti-aircraft gun loaded to higher pressures. The resulting round was different from 17-pounder ammunition, being shorter, more compact and more easily stored and handled within the tank. Testing on the range by 2nd Fife and Forfarshire Yeomanry as they converted from Shermans showed that the gun did not penetrate the front armour plate of a captured German Panther tank.

Several other improvements were made and many Cromwell design revisions were incorporated, such as safety hatches for the driver and hull gunner. The hull was fully welded as standard and armour was increased, ranging from 32 mm to 74 mm on the hull, while the turret was from 57 to 102 mm.

A new lower-profile welded turret was created using a cast gun mantlet for the 77 mm. The turret was electrically traversed (a design feature taken from the Churchill tank), with a generator powered by the main engine rather than the hydraulic system of the Cromwell. Ammunition for the 77 mm gun was stored in armoured bins.

The Comet's suspension was strengthened, and track return rollers were added. As with later Cromwells, the Comet tank's top speed was limited from the Cromwell's 40+ mph to a slower, but respectable 32 mph (51 km/h). This change preserved the lifespan of suspension and engine components and reduced track wear.

Similar to later Churchills, the Comet benefited from lessons learned in the co-operation of tanks with infantry. It was fitted as standard with two radio sets: a Wireless Set No. 19, for communication with the regiment and the troop, and a No. 38 Wireless for communication with infantry units. Like many British tanks, it also had a telephone handset mounted on the rear so that accompanying infantry could talk to the crew.

== Production ==
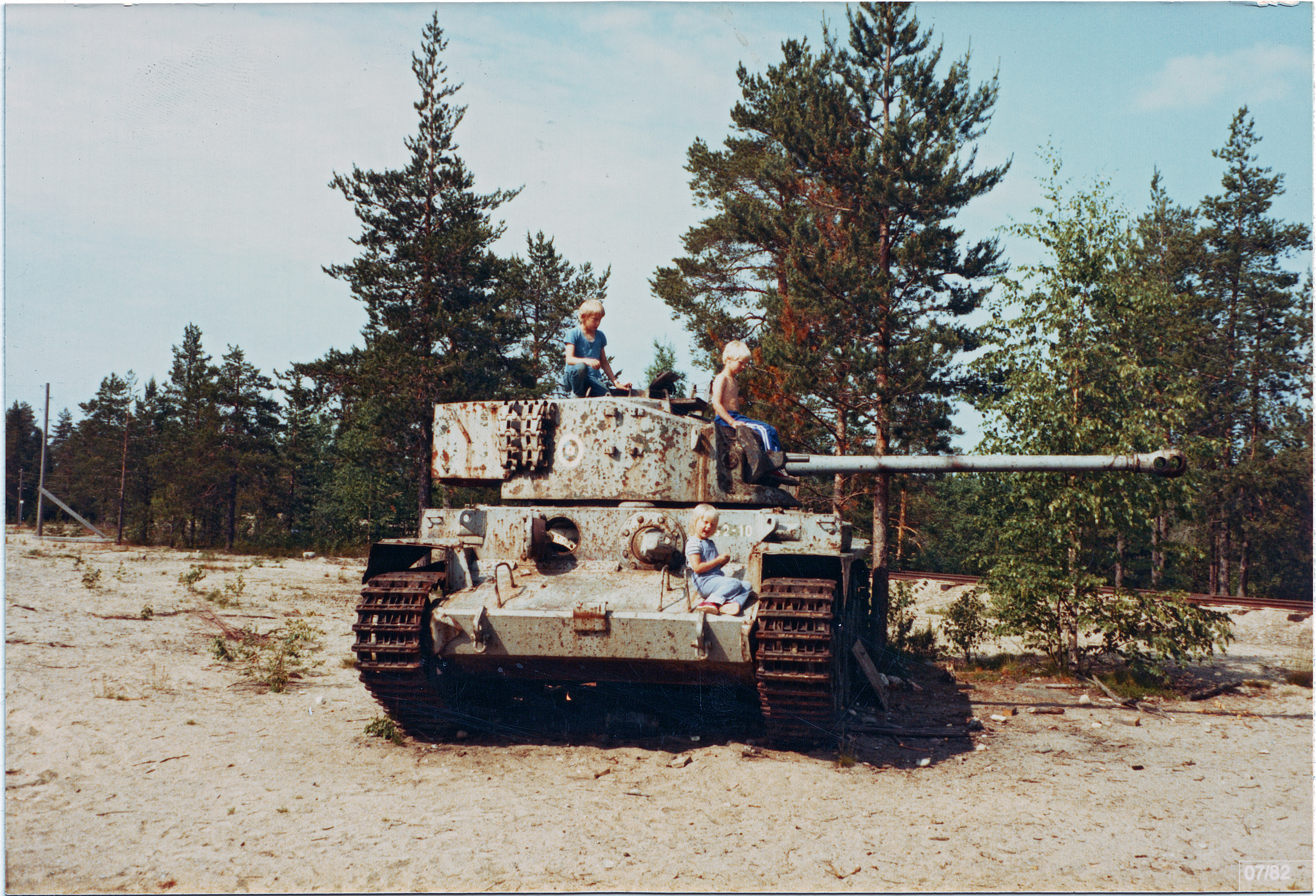
Leyland Comet Mk I Model B in Joensuu, Finland in 1982

Comet tanks were built by a number of British firms led by Leyland, including English Electric, John Fowler & Co., and Metro-Cammell.

The mild steel prototype was ready in February 1944 and entered trials. Concerns about the hull gunner and belly armour were put to one side to avoid redesign, but there was still sufficient delay caused by minor modifications and changes. Production models did not commence delivery until September 1944. The Comet was intended to be in service by December 1944, but crew training was delayed by the German Ardennes Offensive. By the end of the war, 1,200 had been produced.

== Service history ==
=== Second World War ===
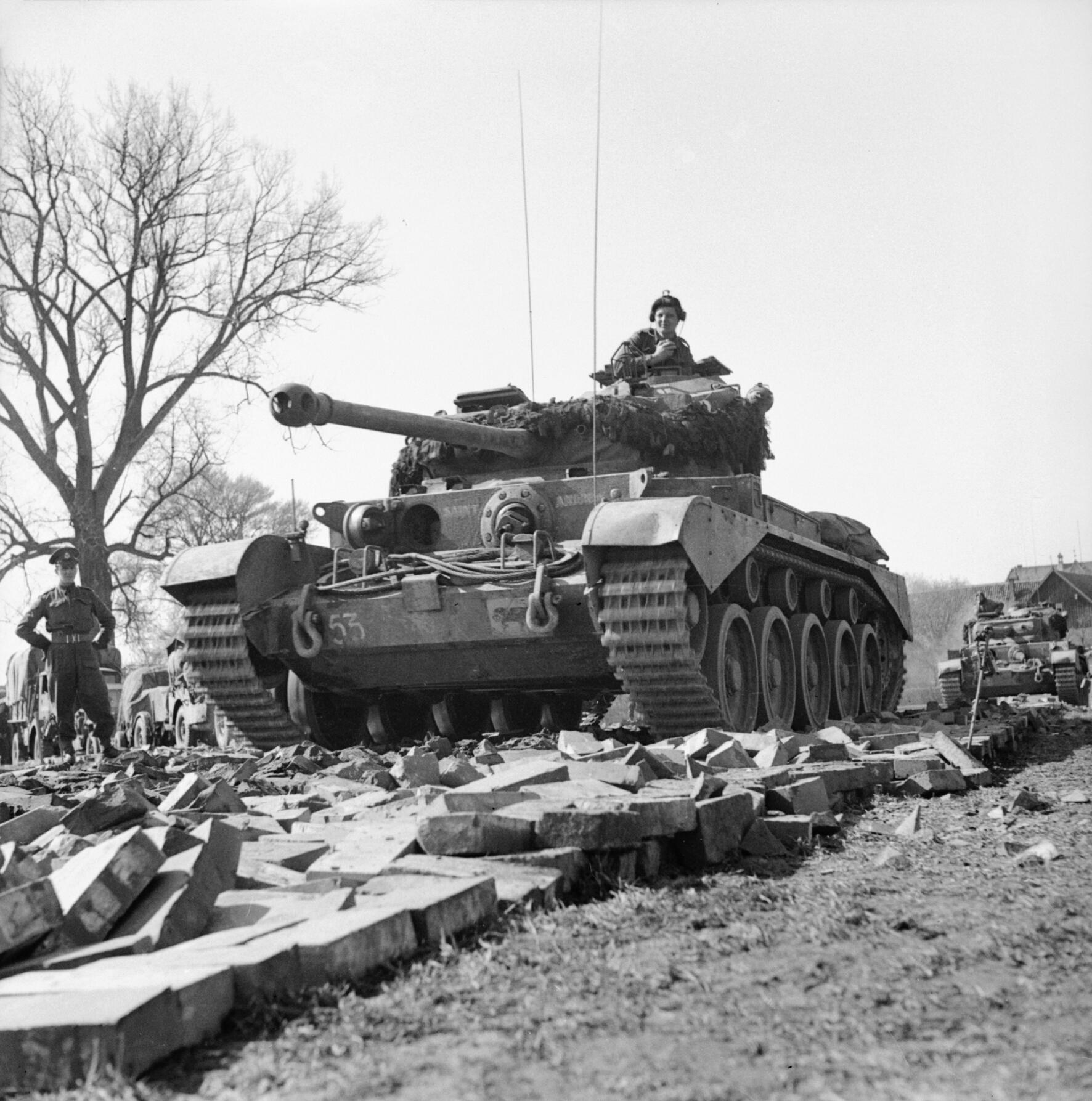
Comet tanks of the 2nd Fife and Forfar Yeomanry, 11th Armoured Division, crossing the Weser at Petershagen, Germany, 7 April 1945

The British 11th Armoured Division was the first formation to receive the new tanks, with deliveries commencing in December 1944 and the 29th Armoured Brigade, then equipped with Shermans, was withdrawn from fighting in the southern Netherlands early in the same month for re-equipping. After arriving in Brussels and preparing to hand in their Shermans the German offensive in the Ardennes (Battle of the Bulge) commenced, and the brigade was forced to hastily take back its Shermans to take part in the countering of the German attack. The unit returned to the Brussels area in the middle of January 1945 three weeks later and finally paid-off its Shermans in exchange for Comets. (Note: units converting were: 2nd Fife and Forfar Yeomanry, 3rd Royal Tank Regiment, and the 23rd Hussars. The 15th/19th The King's Royal Hussars, a Cromwell unit, had re-equipped with the Comet by March 1945) The 11th Armoured Division was the only division completely refitted with the Comet by the end of the war. The Comet saw combat and 26 were destroyed but due to its late arrival in the war in north west Europe, it did not participate in any large battles. The Comet was involved in the Operation Plunder crossing of the Rhine, and took part in the Berlin Victory Parade in July 1945.

=== Postwar era ===
In the post war era the Comet served alongside the heavier Centurion tank, a successor introduced in the closing days of the Second World War on an experimental basis but too late to see combat. The Comet remained in British service until 1958, when the remaining tanks were sold to foreign governments; up until the 1980s, it was used by the armies of various nations such as South Africa, which maintained several as modified recovery vehicles. Two examples were still being held in reserve by the South African Army as late as 2000.

Forty-one Comet Mk I Model Bs were also used by Finnish Defence Forces armoured brigade until 1970. The tanks were stored until 2007, when four of them were auctioned.

Four Comets were delivered to the Irish Army in 1959 and a further four in 1960. Severe budget cutbacks affected the service lives of the Comets, as not enough spares were purchased. The Comet appealed to the Irish Army as it was cheap to buy and run, had low ground pressure and good anti-tank capability. However, faulty fuzes meant the withdrawal of the HE ammunition, which limited the tank's role to an anti-tank vehicle. With stocks of 77 mm ammunition dwindling in 1969, the army began an experiment to prolong the life of the vehicle. It involved replacing the turret with an open mounting with the Bofors 90 mm Pv-1110 recoilless rifle. The project was cancelled due to lack of funds. The last 77 mm Comet shoot was in 1973 with the tanks being withdrawn soon afterwards. One is preserved in the Irish Curragh Camp and two more survive in other barracks.

Cuba was an operator of the Comet tank; operating 15 purchased from the UK. In 1958, the US began to cut off weapons sales to Cuba following the American government's decision to stop Cuba from using its US-supplied armaments against pro-communist/socialist rebels throughout the country. The regime of Fulgencio Batista was forced to seek arms from other nations, which included the UK, which sold the Comet tanks from stocks (the government also allowed the purchase of 17 Hawker Sea Fury fighter aircraft from the manufacturer). The Comets arrived in Havana on 17 December 1958. After the collapse of the Batista regime on 1 January 1959, the new revolutionary government under Fidel Castro sought replacement parts and ammunition for their Comets from the British government, which having agreed to no further arms sales to Cuba in conjunction with the US, refused. The few Comets in Cuba were soon retired from service and either scrapped or abandoned, being replaced with larger quantities of T-34/85 and T-54/55 tanks received from the Soviet Union.

Burma ("Union of Burma" it was then known; now Myanmar) was another user of the Comet tank, with around 25 bought from their former colonial rulers in between the late 1950s and the early 1960s. These took part in their Armed Forces Day held on 27 March 2021.

During the 1964 Ethiopian-Somali Border War, the Somali National Army's only tanks were five Comets, serving alongside six Ferret armoured cars and eighteen Universal Carriers. In February 1964, reports described 'Somali tanks' deploying to battle in Tog Wajaale. Towards the end of the war, Ethiopia's defense ministry claimed "Somali tanks" were involved in an attack near the Ena Guha on March 26-27, and that one had been destroyed and another captured.

== Operators ==
- Cuba: 15
- Finland: 41
- Ireland: 8
- Myanmar: 25
- Somalia: 5
- South Africa: 26
- United Kingdom
- Sweden: 3 (Only used for testing)

== Variants ==
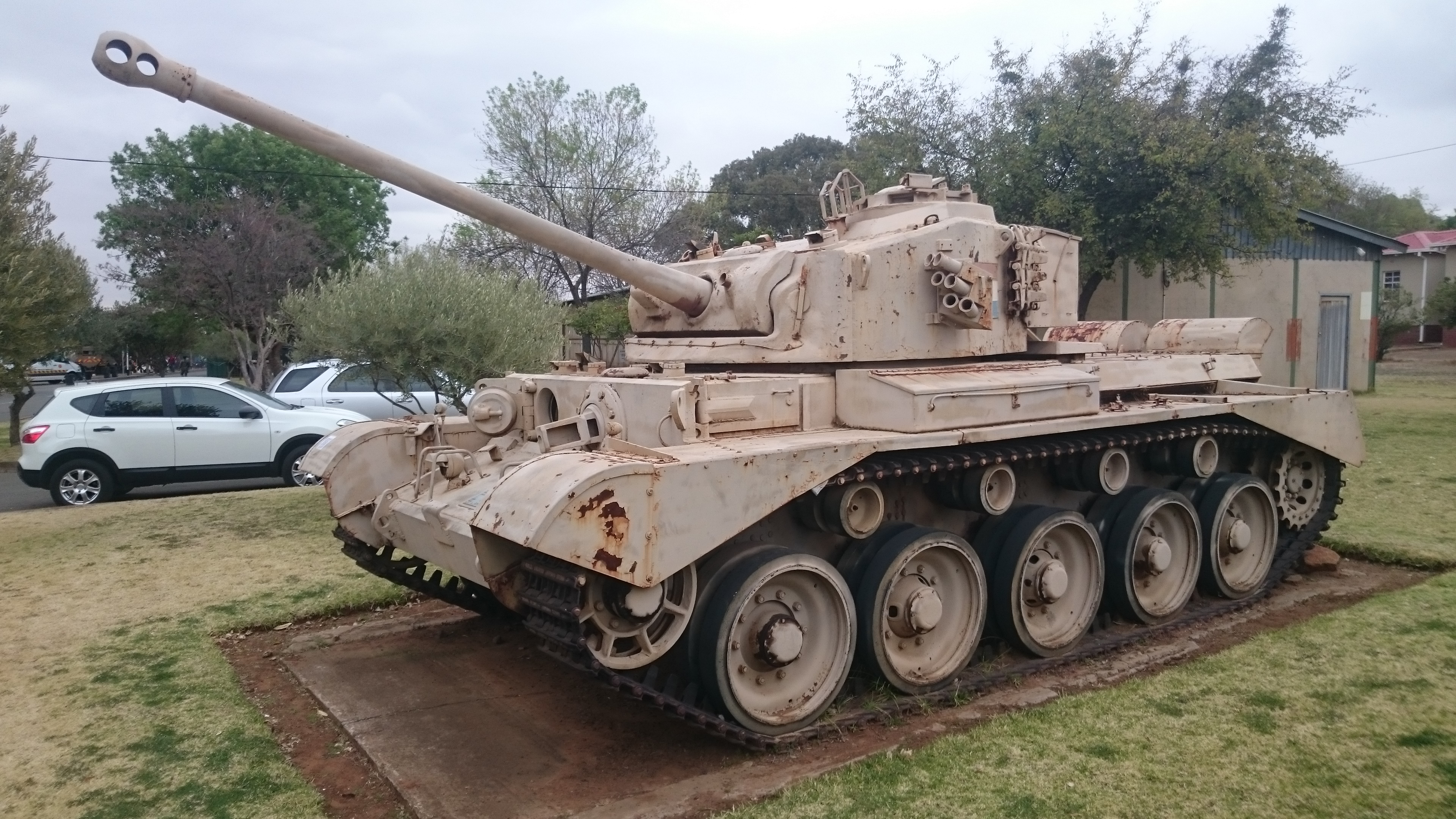
A Comet Type A; the split independent cowling covers can be seen at the rear of the tank.

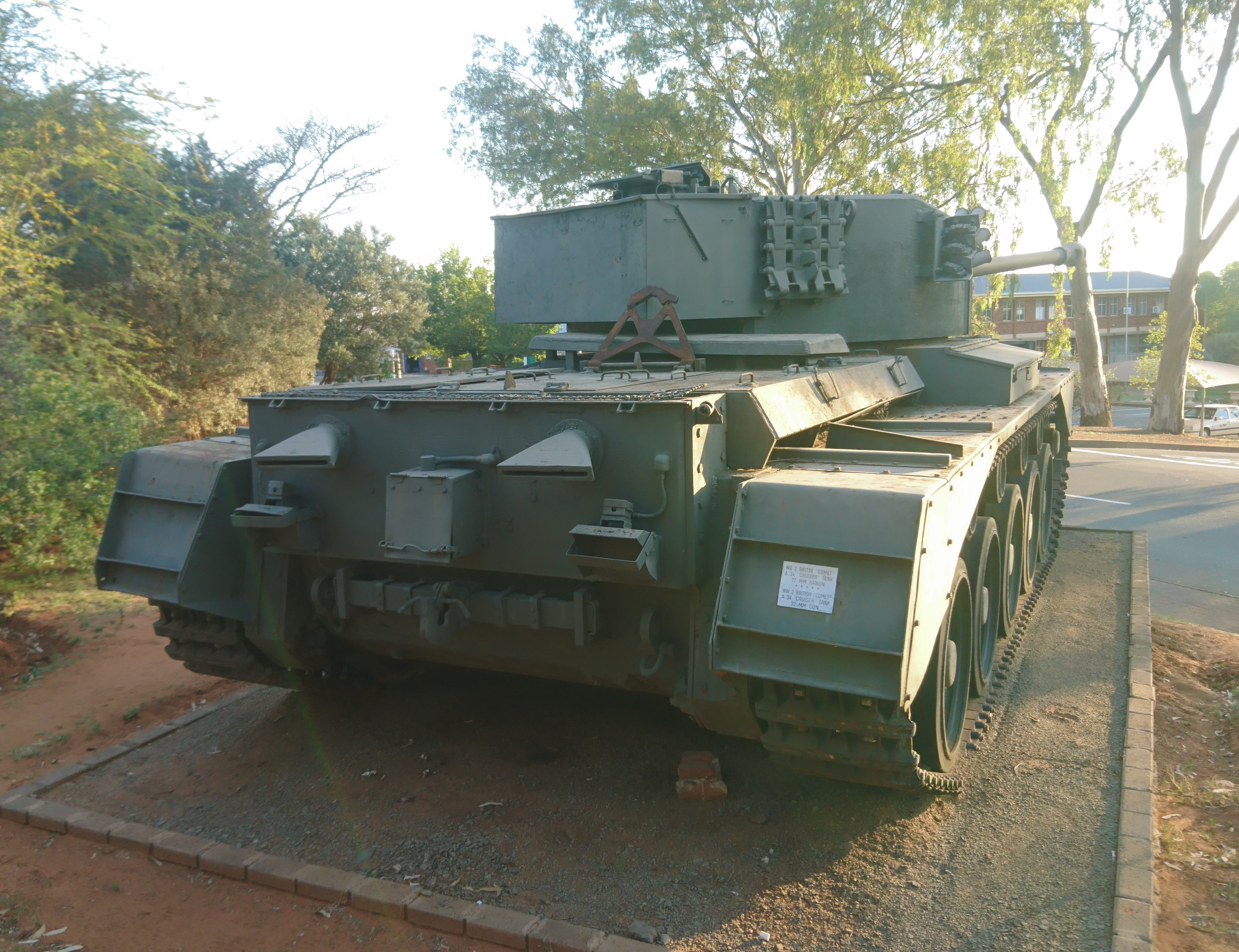
The rear of a Comet Type B showing the twin fishtail exhaust pipes

There were two Comet hull versions:

Type A
With the exhaust venting through the top rear of the vehicle engine deck similar to that of the Cromwell. These could be fitted with cowls to redirect exhaust fumes away from the air inlet vents. Cowls were usually split into two independent covers, as opposed to the single cover fitted to the Cromwell.

Type B
A post-war update with twin fishtail exhaust pipes exiting through holes in the rear-facing armoured plate. Cowls were no longer required. Early Type B Comets had armoured covers over the holes through which the fishtail exhaust pipes would protrude, retaining the older Model A setup.

Other vehicles that were based upon the Comet:

Comet Crocodile
One surviving photo shows a Comet Crocodile. This mounted a flamethrower and towed a fuel trailer similar to the Churchill Crocodile. Little is known about it.

Comet 20pdr
Finland tested a comet tank with new welded turret made by Lokomo and Army technical team, it was fitted with 84 mm gun from charioteer tank. This prototype was however abandoned.

Armoured Maintenance Vehicle
The Comet was used by South Africa as the basis of a maintenance vehicle to support their Olifant Mk1A main battle tank (a variant of the Centurion). It had a crew of four and had a mass of 20 metric tons. It was powered by an AVI-1790-8 Continental, V12 90°, air cooled, fuel injection engine producing 615kW (852 hP), through an Allison CD 850 automatic three speed (low, high, reverse) transmission and had a maximum speed of 60 km/h. For its maintenance task it featured a welding machine, a hydrovane (high pressure air and water), a crane (1.5 to 6 metric tons), spare lubricants, 200 litres of water, cutting facilities and carried a spare engine for the Olifant Mk1A. It was also fitted with six smoke grenade launchers (four rearward facing and four forward facing) for self defence.

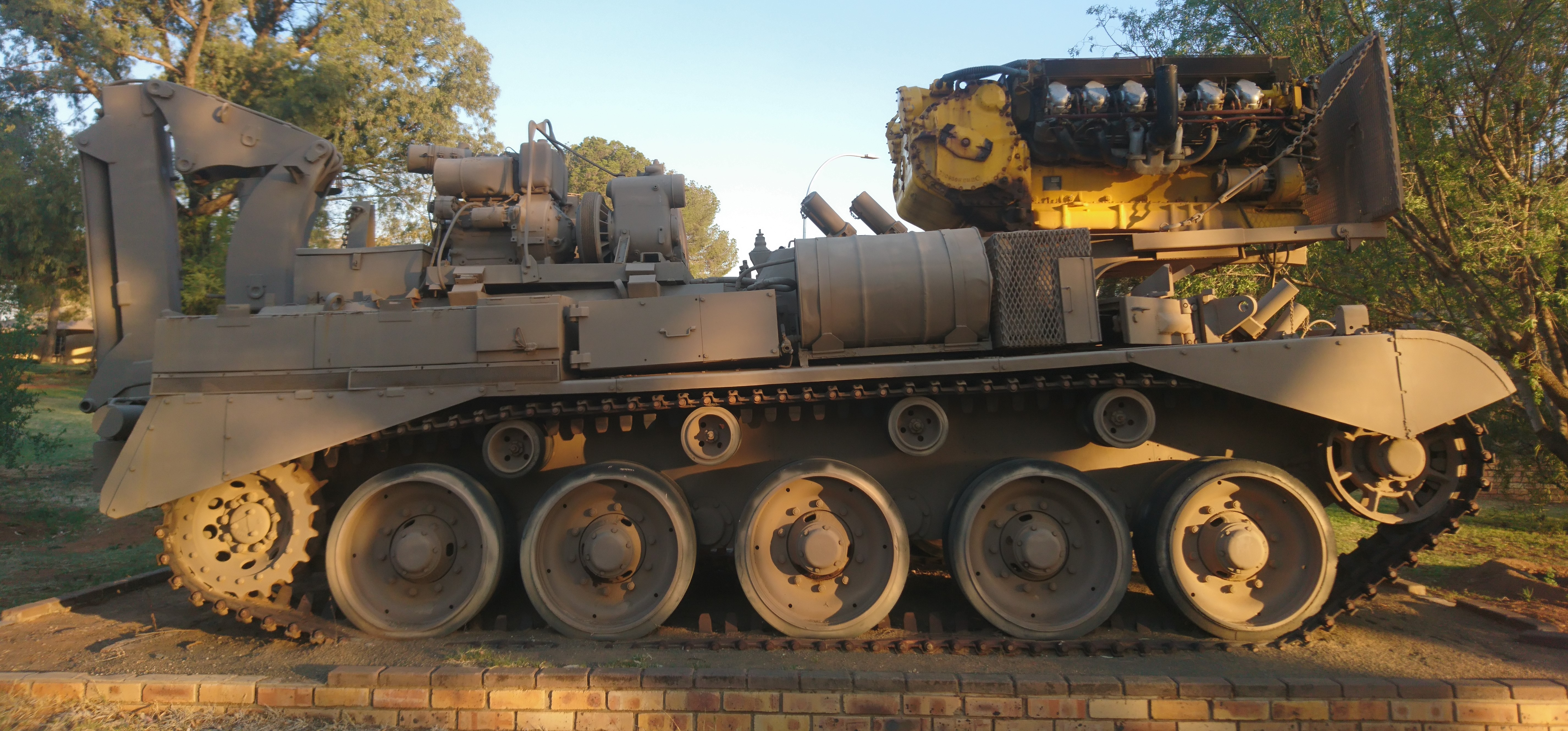
The Comet-based Armoured Maintenance Vehicle on display at the South African Armoured Museum. A spare engine for the Olifant Mk1A can be seen on the right above the driver's position.

FV4401 Contentious
The Comet was used as the basis for the experimental FV4401 Contentious, an air-transportable self-propelled anti-tank gun mounting a 105 mm L7 gun in an open mounting on the shortened hull of a Comet, and using the vehicle's hydraulic suspension system to adjust elevation, similar to the method used on the Swedish S-Tank. One or two prototypes were built and tested before the entire project was cancelled.

COMRES 75
COMRES 75 was an experimental tank built by FVRDE in 1968 that had an unmanned turret for an 84 mm gun and autoloader, on a Comet chassis. It was sufficiently successful that the idea was considered during the initial stages of the Anglo-German Future Main Battle Tank programme.

== Survivors ==
Surviving vehicles include:

- The Curragh Museum, Irish Defence Forces, Ireland has a restored A34 in running condition.
- Curragh Camp, Irish Defence Forces, Ireland has two surviving A34's on static display.
- Custume Barracks Athlone, Irish Defence Forces, Ireland has one A34 as a static display. Formally located at Connolly Barracks in Longford.
- 1 Special Service Battalion near Bloemfontein, South Africa, has one Type A, with a single cowling, on display.
- The American Heritage Museum in Stow, Massachusetts, US has one in running order.
- The German Tank Museum, Munster.
- The Military Museum Lešany, has one comet tank on display.
- The Hong Kong Museum of Coastal Defence has a Comet on display.
- The Imperial War Museum Duxford has a Comet in its Land Warfare Hall.
- Johannesburg Light Horse Regiment in Johannesburg, South Africa has one Type B on display.
- The Muckleburgh Collection, Norfolk. (former Irish Defence Forces)
- The Musée des Blindés has a Comet on display.
- Queen Nandi Mounted Rifles in Durban, South Africa has one Type B on display.
- The Parola Tank Museum in Finland has three Comets: two on display (one was used as a target dummy) and one in running order.
- Arsenalen has one Type B on display.
- Pretoria Armoured Regiment in Pretoria, South Africa has one Type B on display.
- The South African Armour Museum at School of Armour has two (a Type A and B), plus an Armoured Maintenance Vehicle variant on display.
- The South African National Museum of Military History has one on display.
- Gaza Barracks Catterick Garrison UK, The Light Dragoons. Post war Gate Guardian
- The Tank Museum, Bovington, UK has at least three Comets, one in drivable condition
- Celerity at the Museum of American Armor in Old Bethpage, New York
- Kubinka Tank Museum

== See also ==
- FV4101 Charioteer - heavily armed cruiser tank also based on the Cromwell

Tanks of comparable role, performance, and era

- M4A3 (76) Sherman – medium tank armed with an 76 mm anti-tank gun, entered US service in 1944
- Panther – medium tank, entered German service in 1943.
- Sherman Firefly – US-built M4/M4A4 Sherman re-armed with a 17-pdr anti-tank gun at a UK Royal Ordinance Factory, entered service in 1944.
- T-34-85 – medium tank, entered Soviet service in 1944.
- Type 4 Chi-To – prototype Japanese medium tank, never entered service.

== Bibliography ==
- Chamberlain, Peter; Ellis, Chris (1969). British and American tanks of World War II. New York: Arco Publishing Co Inc. ISBN 0-668-01867-4.
- Fletcher, David; Harvey, Richard C. (2006). Cromwell Cruiser Tank 1942–1950. New Vanguard No. 104. Osprey Publishing. ISBN 1-84176-814-6.
- Miller, David (2000). The Illustrated Directory of Tanks of the World: From World War I to the Present Day. Zenith. ISBN 9780760308929.
- Steve Crawford, Chris Westhorp (2000). Tanks of World War II. Zenith. ISBN 9780760309360.
- "Comet". WWIIVehicles.com. Archived from the original on 17 May 2007.
- Zaloga, Steve (2015). Armored Champion: The Top Tanks of World War II. Stackpole. ISBN 978-0811714372.
