= British standard ordnance weights and measurements =

The British standard ordnance weights and measurements for the artillery were established by the Master General of Ordnance in 1764, and these were not altered until 1919, when the metric system was additionally introduced. This system has largely been replaced by defining the weapon in terms of the measurement of the calibre, which is the standard today for most weapon systems in use by the world's armed forces. The 18th century standards were based on a projectile's weight, which dates back to use of muzzle loaded cannons that fired solid cannonballs. The bore designations are only an approximate relationship to the actual weight of the projectile when it was applied to modern artillery. The table below lists the metric and Imperial calibres of various British weapons, which used the standard after 1919:

Name	Type	Calibre	
Name	Type	Metric	Imperial
Ordnance QF 1-pounder "pom pom"	Infantry gun/AA gun	37 mm	1.457 inch
Ordnance QF 2-pounder	Anti-tank gun	40 mm	1.575 inch
Ordnance QF 2-pounder "pom pom"	Anti-aircraft gun	40 mm	1.575 inch
Ordnance QF 3-pounder Vickers	Naval gun	47 mm	1.85 inch
Ordnance QF 6-pounder	Anti-tank gun	57 mm	2.244 inch
Ordnance BL 10-pounder Mountain gun	Mountain gun	69.8 mm	2.75 inch
12-pounder (multiple types)	Light field gun	76.2 mm	3 inch
Ordnance QF 13-pounder	Light field gun	76.2 mm	3 inch
15- pounder (several types)	Field gun	76.2 mm	3 inch
Ordnance QF 17- pounder	Anti-tank gun	76.2 mm	3 inch
Ordnance QF 18- pounder	Field gun	83.8 mm	3.3 inch
Ordnance QF 20-pounder	Tank gun	83.8 mm	3.3 inch
Ordnance QF 25-pounder	Gun-howitzer	87.6 mm	3.45 inch
Ordnance QF 32-pounder	Tank gun	94 mm	3.7 inch
Ordnance QF 60-pounder	Heavy field gun	127 mm	5 inch

== Terminology ==
When used with British standard nomenclature:

- BL is short for "Breech Loading", but generally means not QF, i.e. separate cordite bags rather than a cartridge case.
- ML is short for "Muzzle Loading".
- PR is short for "Pounder", e.g. 20 Pounder can be shortened to "20-PR". pdr is also a common shortening of "pounder", e.g. 17pdr.
- QF is short for "Quick Firing", indicating the weapon is breech-loaded with the propellant in a cartridge case which also made the breech seal, allowing faster loading and firing.

== See also ==
- Pounds as a measure of cannon bore
- Glossary of British ordnance terms
