= Charioteer (tank) =

British armoured fighting vehicle

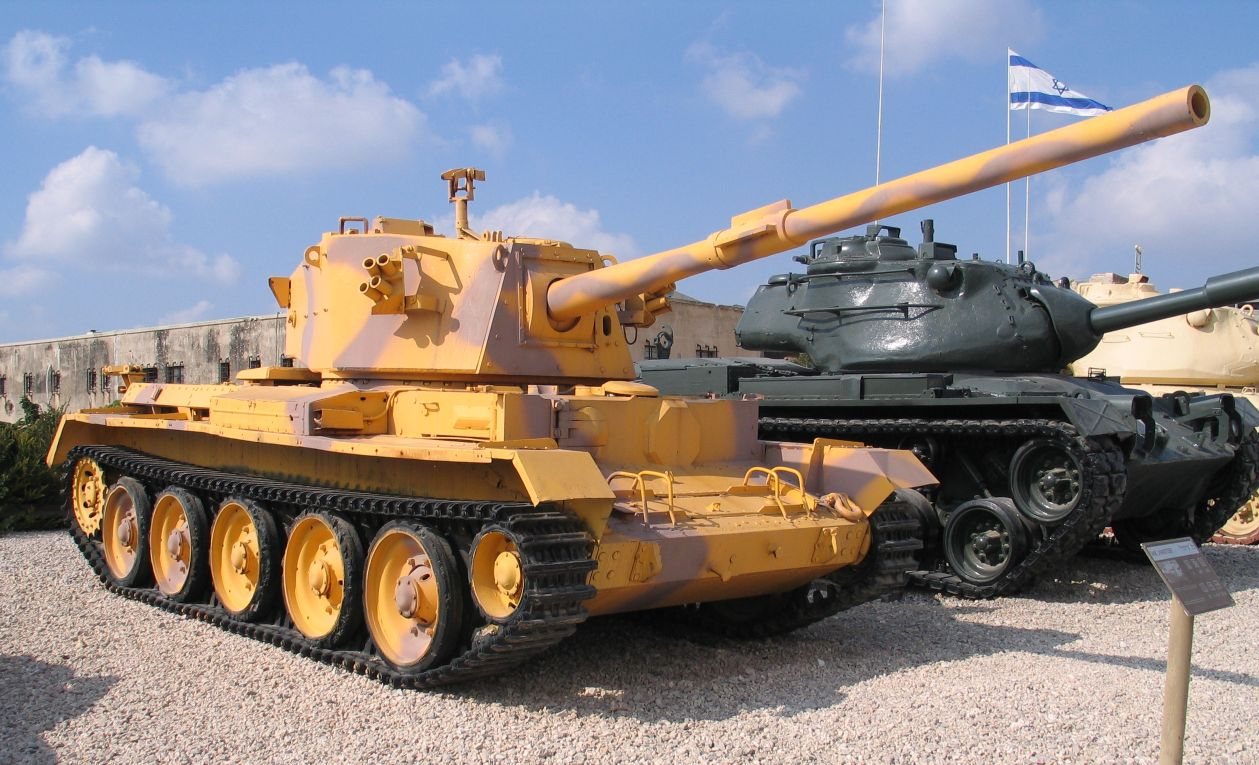
- Charioteer at Yad La-Shiryon, Latrun
- Type: Medium Tank built from Cruiser Tank (based on weight, speed, calibre of gun, armor, and the text.).
- Place of origin: United Kingdom

Service history
- In service: 1952–1980
- Used by: British Army; Finnish Army; Royal Jordanian Army; Lebanese Army
- Wars: 1978 South Lebanon conflict Lebanese Civil War

Production history
- Manufacturer: Robinson and Kershaw Ltd, Dukinfield, Cheshire
- No. built: 442

Specifications
- Mass: 28.5 tons
- Length: 8.8 metres
- Width: 3.1 metres
- Height: 2.5 metres
- Crew: 3 crew (4 with external observer)
- Main armament: 84 mm (3.3 in) Ordnance QF 20 pounder
- Secondary armament: 7.62 mm (0.3 in) Browning M1919A4 coaxial machine gun
- Engine: Rolls-Royce Meteor; 600 hp
- Suspension: Improved Christie
- Maximum speed: 32 mph (51 km/h)

The Charioteer Tank, or FV4101 Tank, Medium Gun, Charioteer was a post–World War II British armoured fighting vehicle. It was produced in the 1950s to up-gun units of the Royal Armoured Corps continuing to use the Cromwell tank during the early phases of the Cold War. The vehicle itself was a modified Cromwell with a more powerful gun installed in a relatively lightly armoured two-man turret.

Charioteer saw limited use with the British Army, but was used more extensively by overseas nations in Europe and the Middle East. Charioteers saw action in conflicts in the Middle-East.

== Development ==
In the early Cold War during the 1950s, plans to combat a potential invasion from Soviet forces called for a Royal Armoured Corps formation to be equipped with the Cromwell tank.

Production of Centurion Mk 3 was slower than production of 20-pounder guns, while the larger-gunned (Note: Conqueror was intended to have a 120 mm gun. A few early Conquerors were equipped with a 20-pdr Centurion turret as the Caernavon) Conqueror heavy tank was still under development to take on the primary anti-tank role. A mixed force of Centurion, Comet and Cromwell tanks was retained in service, but the Cromwell's 75mm armament lacked the punch to deal with more modern potential foes. With an increased requirement for anti-tank performance in the interim, an up-gunning of Cromwell was needed. This was to incorporate the same 20 pounder (84 mm) gun as used in the Centurion Mk 3.

Mounting the gun required a new two-man turret to be developed. The resulting vehicle was initially named FV4101 Cromwell Heavy AT Gun, but renamed 'Charioteer' before entering service.

== Design ==
Design focused primarily on anti-tank capabilities, sharing much in common with American WWII-era tank destroyers. This has caused confusion with tank destroyers in many references, although the vehicle was designed for, and remained in, the tank role.

The new turret used the larger Ordnance QF 20 pounder gun. This was mounted with a co-axial 0.30 in M1919 Browning machine gun. Smoke grenade dischargers were fitted to both sides of the turret. A flap to the turret rear allowed spent shell casings from the gun to be ejected from the vehicle.

Hulls were based on the later Cromwell VII standard, modified with Comet Model B style fishtail exhausts and no hull-mounted machine gun. Most hulls were reworked to Type F standard, and fire extinguisher pulls were re-routed to the two track-side bins. A large armoured telephone box was fitted to the vehicle rear for communication with infantry.

Additional defensive armour was welded to the Cromwell hull in keeping with the Cromwell VII standard, but the turret upgrade focused on offensive capability. Weight limitations on the suspension prevented the use of heavier armour on the turret, and whilst sloped to increase the effective protection, the new turret was much thinner armour at 20–30 mm.

The turret ring was slightly increased in size to accommodate the larger gun, but the size limitation of the Cromwell hull meant that the new turret would need to be much larger and taller around it. This gave the vehicle a much higher profile.

Even with this size increase, stowage for the larger ammunition rounds was severely limited. The hull machine gunner's position was removed to provide additional stowage space for ammunition, but the vehicle still carried only 25 rounds. Some conventional High Explosive (HE) shells were carried, but the primary ammunition was Armour-Piercing Discarding Sabot projectiles (APDS)

A mixed collection of Cromwells were upgraded, resulting in a number of variations in design based on the vehicle's previous format.

== Production ==
Building on the remaining Cromwell tanks as a basis, the tanks were converted by Robinson and Kershaw Ltd at their works in Dukinfield, Cheshire. While an expected production run of 630 was indicated in 1951, the production was cut short and the exact number produced is unclear. The first 200 were expected by March 1953 with a further 200 following in 1954. The actual number produced is believed to be 442.

British historian David Fletcher considered it as the fifth-worst British tank produced. His particular criticisms were mostly about the bulky, thin-armoured turret, but also about it being considered as a tank rather than restricted to being an extemporised tank destroyer.

== Service ==
During development and manufacture the British Army went through two re-organisations, resulting in the tanks being reassigned to Royal Armoured Corps units of the British Territorial Army. These tanks replaced tank destroyers and self-propelled guns transferred from the Royal Artillery to the RAC during the re-organisation.

The number of vehicles required was cut, and only a small number entered service. Manufacturing of the modification was halted with around 440 of 630 vehicles completed. Surplus vehicles were sold to Austria, Finland, Jordan and Lebanon. The tanks were used by a number of forces in the Middle East through instability in the region, such as the Six-Day War and the Lebanese Civil War.

While the vehicle was originally intended to operate with a 3-man crew, the commander's visibility from the turret was restricted during firing. This meant a 4th crew member was added as an external observer, meaning they would get out of the vehicle and relay information to the crew inside. The large size of the turret meant the vehicle was best used in a hull down position, firing over cover.

== Operators ==
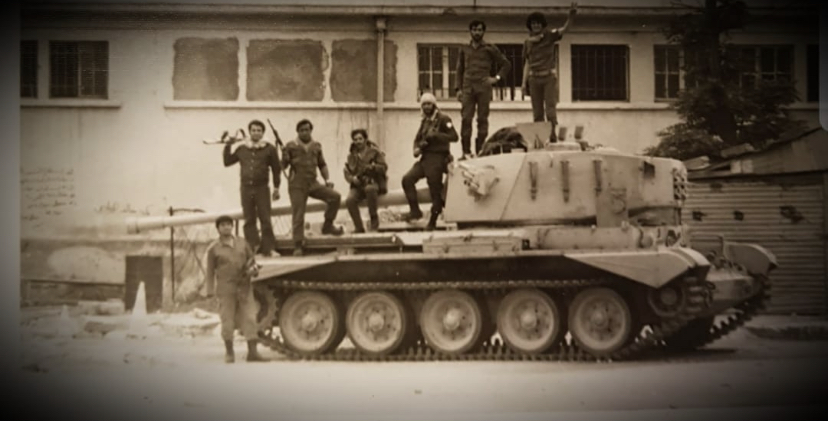
Lebanese Arab Army (LAA) soldiers on top of a captured Charioteer tank, Lebanon, 1 January 1978

Kuwait

- Kuwait Army: operated an unknown number of tanks between 1952 and 1962.

Austria

- Austrian Army: used 56 vehicles from 1956 till 1965. Turrets of retired Charioteer tanks were fixed in Austrian bunker systems.

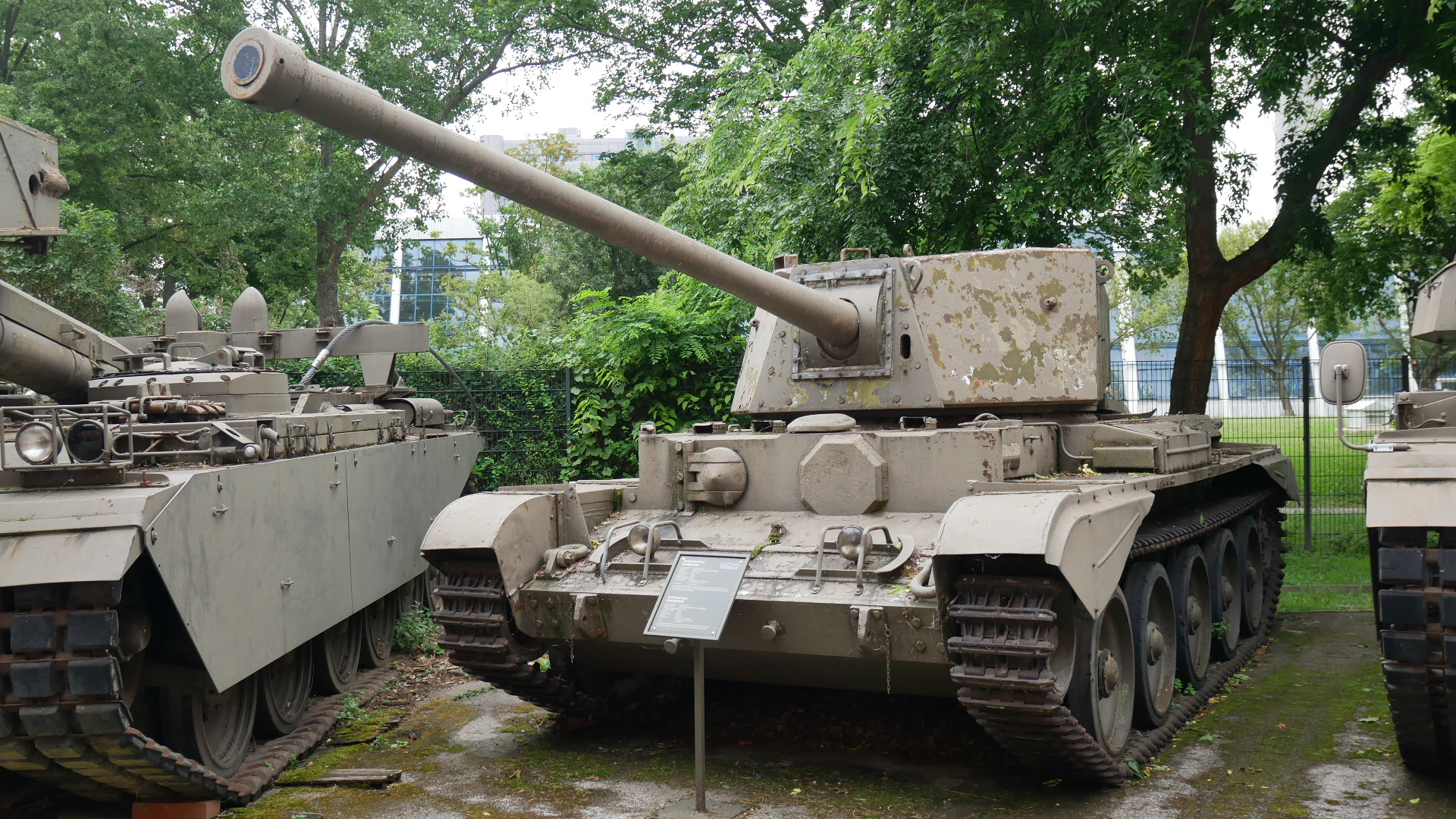
Former Austrian Army Charioteer tank at the Heeresgeschichtliches Museum in Vienna

Finland

- Finnish Army: bought a total of 38 "Charioteer Mk VII Model B", 3 in 1958 and 35 in 1960. They were removed from wartime organisation in 1972, but they remained in training use until 1980. A number were stored until 2007 when 15 were auctioned off. A further 10 were released in 2024, 9 of which were auctioned.

Jordan

- Jordanian Army: equipped two squadrons (24 vehicles) of their 3rd Tank Regiment in 1954. Some of the Jordanian Charioteers were sold to Lebanon.

Lebanon

- Lebanese Armed Forces: received 43 vehicles, passed on in 1976 to several Lebanese or Palestinian warring factions.
- Army of Free Lebanon: operated an unknown number of tanks between 1976 and 1977.
- Lebanese Arab Army: operated an unknown number of tanks between 1976 and 1977.
- Lebanese Forces: operated an unknown number of tanks between 1980 and 1993.
- Al-Mourabitoun: operated an unknown number of tanks between 1976 and 1978.
- South Lebanon Army: operated an unknown number of tanks between 1976 and 1983.
- Tigers Militia: operated an unknown number of tanks between 1976 and 1980.

Palestine

- Palestine Liberation Organisation: operated several ex-Lebanese Army vehicles against the Israel Defense Forces in Southern Lebanon during the 1978 South Lebanon conflict.

United Kingdom

- Territorial Army: main operator of the Charioteer tank.

== Variants ==
Production was based on a mixed fleet of Cromwell VI, VII, VIIw and VIII vehicles of mixed hull types. While all were upgraded to VII standard, some hull differences remained based on the vehicle's past. As a result, the vehicle continued to be known as Charioteer, Mks. 6, 7, 7w and 8 with hull types D, E and F.

The Ordnance QF 20 pounder was upgraded during production and service, and many vehicles were fitted with the later 20 pounder featuring a symmetrical fume extractor mid-barrel. Those without the fume extractor were dubbed Charioteer VIIA or Model A while those with the upgrade were named Charioteer VIIB or Model B.

In Jordanian Army use the vehicle was altered with upgraded electrically driven turret traverse motors, and a larger commander's cupola mounting a .50 calibre machine gun. These traverse-motors were driven from a separate electrical supply. Different radio equipment was also fitted.

Beyond the original requirement, further up-gunning was attempted. A single vehicle was upgraded with the Royal Ordnance L7 105mm gun for trials in 1969. It was intended for export and did not enter service. Finland attempted to carry out the gun upgrade to the L7 on their Charioteers already in the early 1960s, but an export permit for the new gun was not granted at the time. The gun is similar in appearance and based on the original, but can be distinguished by an offset fume extractor (larger at the top). The vehicle was previously in the Shaun Hindle Collection, but it was torn apart in 2019 and converted to a Cromwell ARV.

== Survivors ==
Austria

- An Austrian Charioteer in the Museum of Military History (HGM - Heeresgeschichtliches Museum) in Vienna.

Finland

- A Finnish Charioteer is on outdoor display in the Parola tank museum.
- Another Finnish Charioteer is on outdoor display near the main entrance of Army Academy in Lappeenranta.
- A Finnish Charioteer is on outdoor display also in Valkeala inside Karelia Brigade garrison, however it can only been seen when grounds are open to public.

Israel

- A Charioteer is on outdoor display in Yad la-Shiryon Museum in Latrun.
- A Charioteer is on outdoor display in Israel Defense Forces History Museum in Tel Aviv.

Jordan

- A Jordanian Charioteer is on display at the Royal Tank Museum in Amman.

United Kingdom

- A Charioteer is on display at The Tank Museum in Dorset, UK.
- A Charioteer turret with the later version 20pdr with the fume extractor is on display (rather poor condition) at Fort Paull near Hull in the UK.

== See also ==
- List of FV series military vehicles
- FV4201 Tank, Medium Gun, no.2, later known as the Chieftain tank.
- Centurion Tank, the Cruiser (medium) tank sharing the same weapon.
- Cromwell Tank, the Cruiser (medium) tank the Charioteer was based on.
- Leopard 1 – (Germany), a tank with similar armour characteristics, design commencing around the same time (1956).

== Bibliography ==
- Major James Bingham, AFV Profile No. 25: Cromwell and Comet, Profile Publications Ltd., Windsor, Berkshire UK 1971.
- Samer Kassis, Véhicules Militaires au Liban/Military Vehicles in Lebanon 1975-1981, Trebia Publishing, Chyah 2012. ISBN 978-9953-0-2372-4
- Steven J. Zaloga, Armour of the Middle East Wars 1948-78, Vanguard series 19, Osprey Publishing Ltd, London 1981. ISBN 0 85045 388 7
- Tom Cooper & Sergio Santana, Lebanese Civil War Volume 1: Palestinian diaspora, Syrian and Israeli interventions, 1970-1978, Middle East@War No. 21, Helion & Company Limited, Solihull UK 2019. ISBN 978-1-915070-21-0
- Paul Jureidini, R. D. McLaurin, and James Price, Military operations in selected Lebanese built-up areas, 1975-1978, Aberdeen, MD: U.S. Army Human Engineering Laboratory, Aberdeen Proving Ground, Technical Memorandum 11–79, June 1979.
- Philipe Naud, La Guerre Civile Libanaise - 1re partie: 1975-1978, Steelmasters Magazine No. 113, August–September 2012, Histoire & Collections, Paris, pp. 8–16. ISSN 1962-4654 (in French)
