= Ordnance QF 32-pounder =

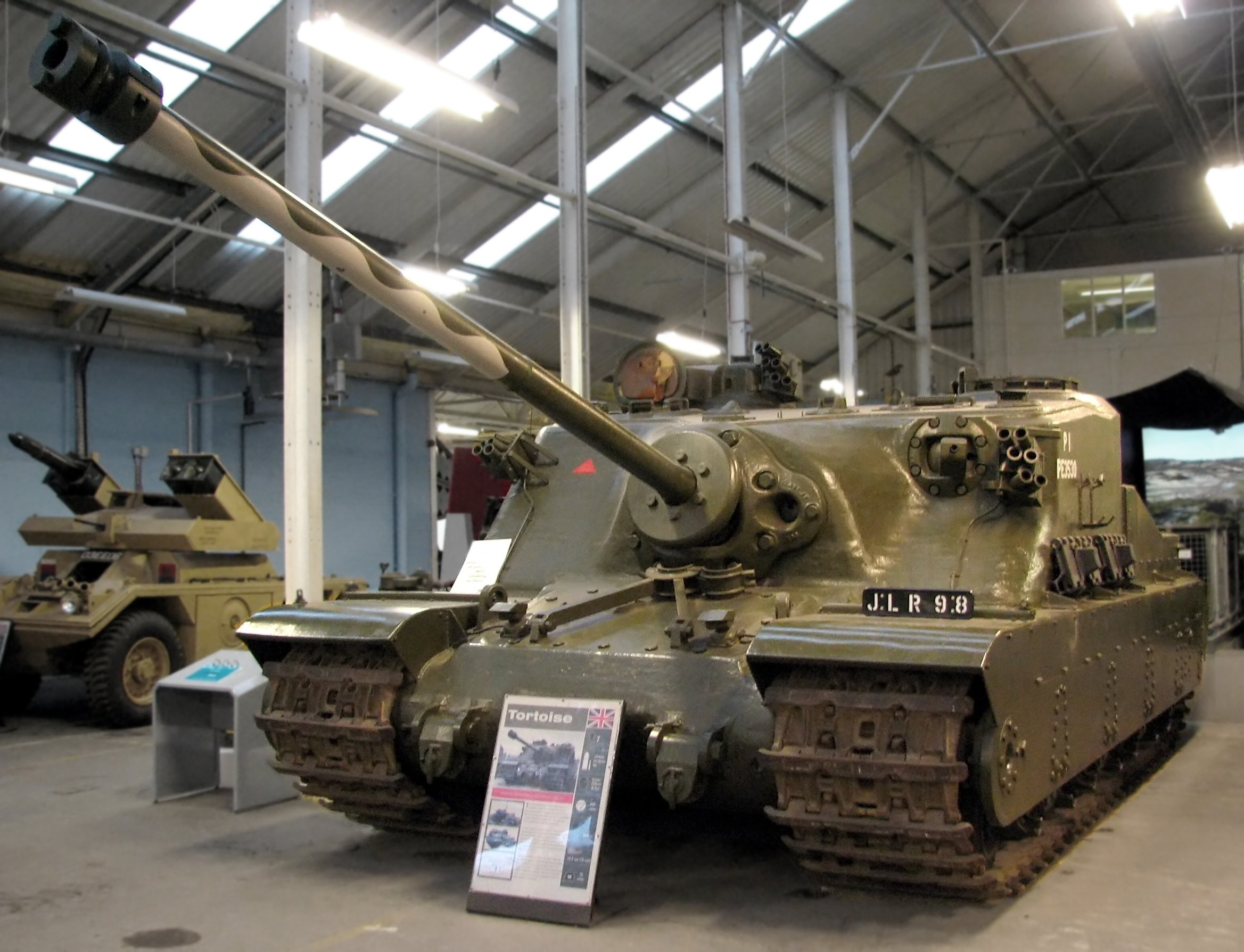
- The 32-pdr mounted in the Assault Tank A39 Tortoise
- Type: Gun
- Place of origin: United Kingdom

Service history
- Used by: UK
- Wars: World War II

Specifications
- Mass: 2,972 kg (6,552 lb)
- Shell: 94×909mmR
- Calibre: 94 mm (3.7 inches)
- Barrels: 5.89 m (L=62.6)
- Muzzle velocity: 5,050 ft/s (1,540 m/s) maximum (APDS)
- Effective firing range: 1,350 yd (1,230 m)
- Maximum firing range: 5,000 yd (4,600 m)

The Ordnance QF 32 pounder or (32-pdr) was a British 94 mm gun, initially developed as a replacement for the Ordnance QF 17-pdr anti-tank gun.

The only use of the 32-pounder was as the armament for the pilot vehicles of the Tortoise heavy assault tank, although two units of a similar development of the QF 3.7" gun, known as the "28pdr" were made for the TOG2 experimental tank.

== Development ==
Development started in October 1942, due to a General Staff order for a successor to the 17-pdr gun. Basic requirements involved the new gun to be "at least 25% more effective" than the 17-pdr. Initial focus was on development of a 55-pdr gun, although advancements in 17-pdr ammunition meant the advantages that would be secured by the 55-pdr were no longer as desirable, while the 55-pdr would suffer from considerable disadvantages such as the difficulties in the handling and stowage of ammunition. Other options considered included a 76 mm (3-inch) 17-pdr firing a 4 lb (1.8 kg) Armour Piercing Composite Rigid (APCR) shot at a muzzle velocity of 3,550 ft/s (1,080 m/s) a 3-inch tapered to 2.25-inch (76 to 57 mm) "squeeze bore" firing a 3.5 lb (1.6 kg) Armour-Piercing, Composite Non-Rigid (APCNR) shot at 4,500 ft/s (1,400 m/s) and a 3.45 in (88 mm) calibre. Eventually, a 3.7-inch 30-pdr gun was proposed for a standard calibre, as it had a better margin for improvement. The QF 3.7-inch anti-aircraft gun was selected as the basis for the 30-pdr anti-tank gun in September 1943 and for pilots to be built.

During development, it was proposed that a 37 lb (17 kg) shot would give better performance, and this new design was trialled as the QF 37 pdr EX1 in June 1944. Following firing trials, the 37 lb shot was dropped for a 32 lb (15 kg) shot, and the gun was accepted as the QF 32-pdr.

At least one 32-pdr was developed as an anti-tank gun on a wheeled carriage and a single example using a novel form of muzzle brake was installed in a de Havilland Mosquito FB Mk. XVIII as an up-gunned version of the 'Tsetse', in place of the 57 mm 6-pounder Molins gun. While flight trials did not take place until after the war had ended, the aircraft flew and the gun fired without problems.

The 32-pdr fired a 32 lb (14.5 kg) armour-piercing shot at a muzzle velocity of 3,050 ft/s (930 m/s) and a 15.3 lb (6.9 kg) Armour-piercing discarding sabot (APDS) shot at 5,050 ft/s (1,540 m/s).

During firing trials on 28 June 1945, the 32-pdr Shot Mk.3 APDS shot penetrated 200 mm (7.9 in) of rolled homogeneous armour at 50° – a line of sight equivalent of 311 mm (12.2 in) - and 4,880 ft/s (1,487 m/s) on impact, which meant that its penetration surpassed those of the 17-pdr and 20-pdr APDS rounds, and could even rival early armour-piercing fin-stabilized discarding sabot (APFSDS) rounds in raw penetration. The 32-pdr gun could have easily penetrated the front hull of the Tiger II (Konigstiger) and Jagdtiger; it would have been the only allied anti-tank gun that could do so in the Second World War. By comparison the M308 HVAP shell of the 90 mm M3 anti-tank gun on the US M36 Gun Motor Carriage could penetrate 114 mm (4.5 in) at 50° at 100 yd (91 m).

Development was halted with the end of the war: the 17-pdr was replaced by the 20-pdr for tank use, and by the 120 mm 'Battalion Anti Tank' recoilless rifle as an anti-tank artillery weapon. For infantry use it was intended to replace the 17-pdr with anti-tank guided missiles.

== Ammunition ==
The ammunition was separate projectile and propelling charge. A number of projectiles were developed or planned including:

- H.E. Mk 1
- H.E. Mk 2
- H.E. Mk 3
- APCBC/T Mk1
- APCBC/T Mk2
- APCBC/T Mk3

The "T" indicated the shot had a tracer element to allow tracking it in flight.

== Specification ==
- Calibre: 94 mm (3.7 in)
- Barrel length: 62.6 calibres, 5.89 m (19 ft 4 in)
- Chamber pressure 49,200 psi (339 MPa)
- Weight: 2,972 kg (6,552 lb)
- Maximum effective range: 4,600 m (5,000 yd)
- Cartridge: 94×909mmR

== See also ==
- British standard ordnance weights and measurements
