= QF 3.7-inch AA gun =

QF 3.7-in heavy anti-aircraft gun
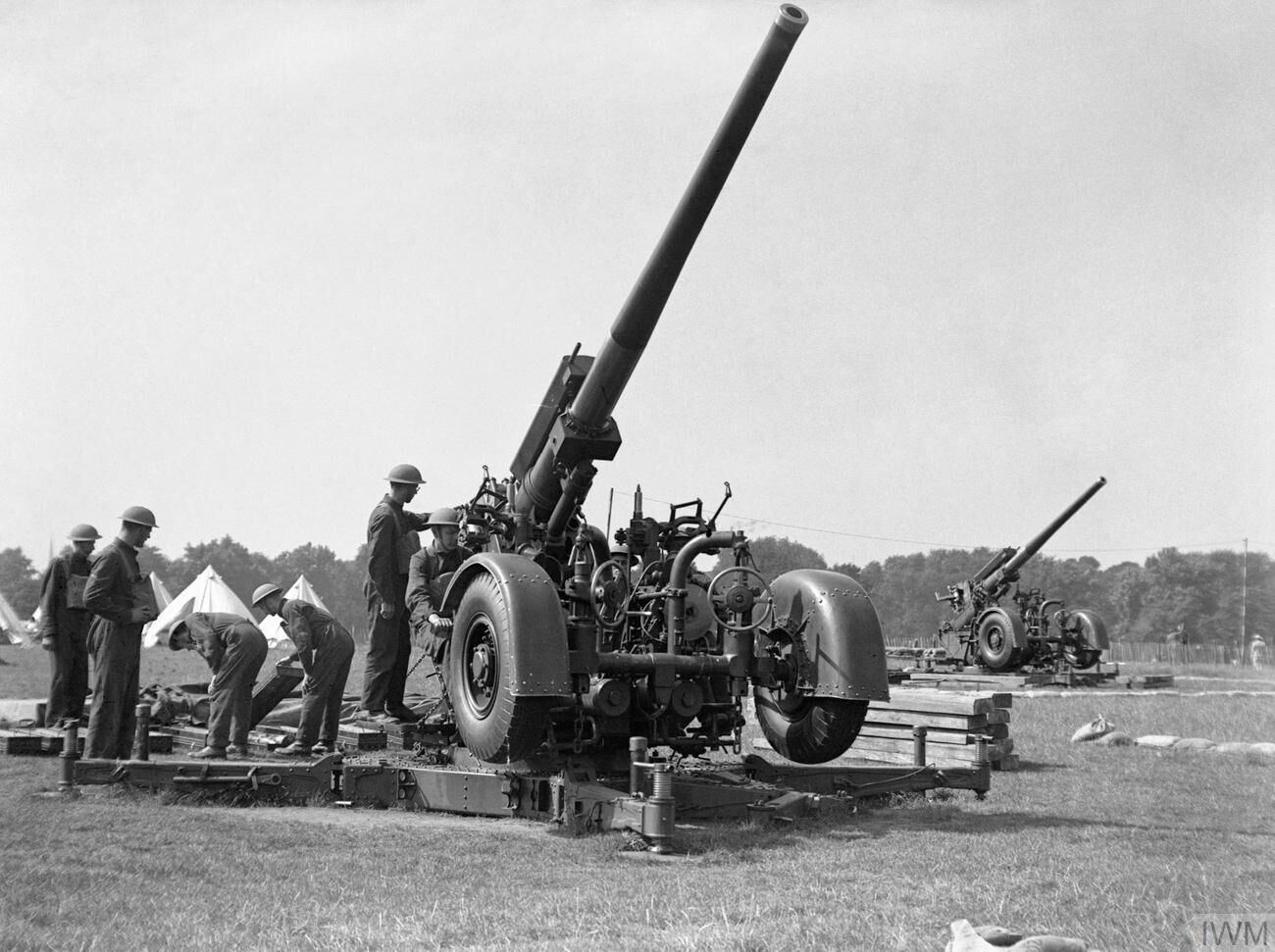
- A 3.7-inch gun on a travelling carriage in London in 1939
- Type: Anti-aircraft gun
- Place of origin: United Kingdom

Service history
- In service: 1937–present (the Nepalese Army still has 45 in service)
- Used by: UK & other Commonwealth countries
- Wars: World War II; Indo-Pakistani War of 1947–1948

Production history
- Designer: Vickers
- Designed: 1937
- Produced: 1937–1945
- No. built: approx. 10.000

Specifications
- Mass: 20,541 lb (9,317 kg)
- Length: 28 ft 3 in (8.6 m)
- Barrel length: Mk I–III: 15 ft 5 in (4.7 m) L/50; Mk VI: L/65
- Width: 7 ft 10 in (2.4 m)
- Height: 8 ft 2 in (2.5 m)
- Crew: 7
- Shell: Mk I–III: Fixed QF 94 x 675mm R Mk VI: 94 x 857mm R
- Shell weight: 28 pounds (13 kg)
- Calibre: 3.7 in (94 mm)
- Breech: Horizontal sliding-wedge
- Recoil: Hydro-pneumatic
- Carriage: Mobile and static versions
- Elevation: −5 to +80 degrees
- Traverse: 360 degrees
- Rate of fire: 10–20 rpm
- Muzzle velocity: Mk I–III: 2,598–2,670 ft/s (792–814 m/s); Mk VI : 3,425 ft/s (1,044 m/s)
- Maximum firing range: Horizontal: 3.5 mi (5.6 km); Slant: 7.5 mi (12 km); Ceiling Mk I–II: 30,000 ft (9 km); Ceiling Mk VI: 45,000 ft (13.7 km)

The QF 3.7-inch AA was Britain's primary heavy anti-aircraft gun during World War II. It was roughly the equivalent of the German Flak 8.8 cm and American 90 mm, but with a slightly larger calibre of 3.7 inches, approximately 94 mm. Production began in 1937 and it was used throughout World War II in all theatres except the Eastern Front. It remained in use after the war until AA guns were replaced by guided missiles beginning in 1957.

The gun was produced in two versions, one mobile and another fixed. The fixed mounting allowed more powerful ammunition, Mk. VI, which gave vastly increased performance. Six variants of the two designs were introduced. The gun was also used as the basis for the Ordnance QF 32-pounder anti-tank gun variant used on the Tortoise heavy assault tank.

== History ==
=== Background ===
During World War I, anti-aircraft guns and anti-aircraft gunnery developed rapidly. The British Army eventually adopted the QF 3-inch 20 cwt as the most commonly used type. Shortly before the end of the war, a new QF 3.6 inch gun was accepted for service but the end of the war meant it did not enter production. After the war, all anti-aircraft guns except the three-inch gun were scrapped.

However, the war had shown the possibilities and potential for air attack and lessons had been learned. The British had used AA guns in most theatres in daylight, as well as against night attacks at home. They had also formed an AA Experimental Section during the war and accumulated much data that was subjected to extensive analysis. After an immediate post-war hiatus, the army re-established peacetime anti-aircraft units in 1922. In 1925, the RAF established a new command, Air Defence of Great Britain, and the Royal Artillery's anti-aircraft units were placed under its command.

In 1924–5, the war office published the two-volume Textbook of Anti-Aircraft Gunnery. It included five key recommendations for heavy anti-aircraft (HAA) guns:

- Shells of improved ballistic shape with HE fillings and mechanical time fuses
- Higher rates of fire assisted by automation
- Height finding by long-base optical rangefinders
- Centralised control of fire on each gun position, directed by tachymetric instruments, which incorporated the facility to apply corrections of the moment for meteorological and wear factors
- More accurate sound-location for the direction of searchlights and to provide plots for barrage fire

Two assumptions underpinned the British approach to HAA fire. First, aimed fire was the primary method and this was enabled by predicting gun data from visually tracking the target with continuous height and range input. Second, that the target would maintain a steady course, speed and height. Heavy anti-aircraft units were to engage targets up to 24,000 feet (7,300 m). Mechanical, as opposed to igniferous, time fuses were required because the speed of powder burning varied with height so fuse length was not a simple function of time of flight. Automated fire ensured a constant rate of fire that made it easier to predict where each shell should be individually aimed.

During the 1920s, Vickers developed the Vickers range clock (Predictor No 1), an electro-mechanical computer that took height and range data from an optical rangefinder, applied corrections for non-standard conditions and was used by its operators to visually track a target, its output predicted firing data and fuse setting via the "mag-slip" electrical induction system to dials on each gun in a battery, the gun layers moved the gun to match pointers on the dials. The three-inch AA guns were modified accordingly.

=== QF 3.7-inch ===
In 1928, the general characteristics for a new HAA gun were agreed, a bore of 3.7 inches (94 mm) firing 25 lb (11 kg) shells with a ceiling of 28,000 feet (8,500 m). Financial stringency led to no action being taken until the 1930s, when the specification was enhanced to a 28 lb (13 kg) shell, 3,000 ft/s (910 m/s) muzzle velocity, a 35,000 feet (11,000 m) ceiling, a towed road speed of 25 mph (40 km/h), maximum weight of eight tons and 15 minutes into action.

In 1934, Vickers-Armstrongs produced a mock-up and developed prototypes of the weapon, which was selected over a competitor by the state Design Department and passed acceptance tests in 1936. The weight specification was exceeded, the muzzle velocity not achieved and the mechanical time fuse, No. 206, was still some years from production. The igniferous No. 199 had to be used and its lesser running time limited the ceiling. The gun passed the trials by April of the following year and the gun production started later in the year.

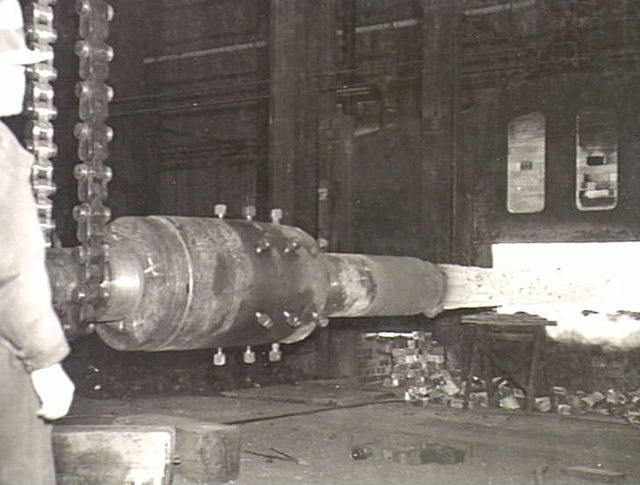
A QF 3.7 inch gun barrel being drawn from a furnace in Australia in 1940

On 1 January 1938, the British air defences had only 180 anti-aircraft guns larger than 50 mm and most of these were the older 3-inch guns. This number increased to 341 by the September 1938 (Munich Crisis), to 540 in September 1939 (declaration of war), and to 1,140 during the Battle of Britain. Production continued until 1945, averaging 228 guns per month throughout the period. Guns were also manufactured in Australia, at the Defence Explosive Factory Maribyrnong; and in Canada, at Canadian General Electric Works in Peterborough, ON. Being a high-velocity gun, with a single charge and firing substantial quantities of ammunition, meant that barrel life could be short and by the end of 1940 there was a barrel shortage. Some of the substantial numbers of spare barrels required were produced in Canada.

In British service, the gun replaced the 3-inch AA gun in HAA batteries and regiments of the Royal Artillery, usually grouped into specialist AA brigades of Anti-Aircraft Command or the field armies. Each regiment usually had three batteries, each of eight guns in two troops. Over 160 of these HAA regiments, RA, plus five of the West African Artillery and two each for the Royal Marines, Hong Kong-Singapore Artillery, Royal Malta Artillery and East African Artillery were eventually formed. Other World War II users were India (about 14 regiments), Canada (two or three regiments) and Australia (equivalent of about 13 regiments).

== Description ==
=== Gun ===
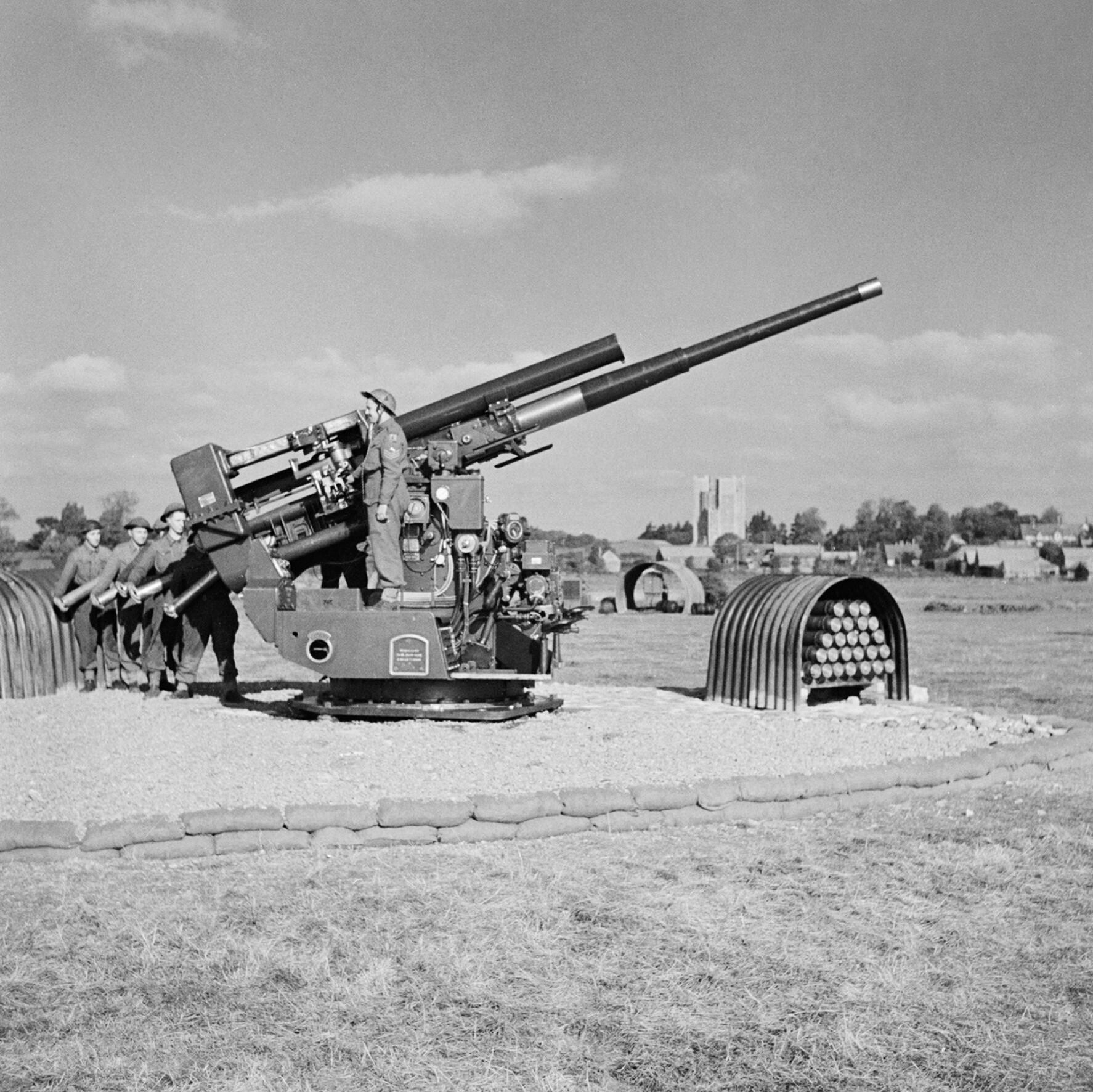
A static 3.7-inch gun assigned to the 127th Heavy Anti-Aircraft Regiment, mounted on a Pile platform at Orford, Suffolk, October 1944

Two versions of the gun were produced. One used a travelling carriage, for use by batteries in the field army. This consisted of a wheeled carriage (Carriage Mk I or Mk III) with four folding outrigger trails and levelling jacks. The wheels were lifted off the ground or removed when the gun was brought into action.

The other used a travelling platform (Mounting Mk II) with detachable wheels for guns to be used in static positions but which could be re-positioned. The mounting had a pedestal that was fixed to a solidly constructed, preferably concrete, platform on the ground. In 1944, it was found that a temporary platform built from railway sleepers and rails was adequate for the static guns, making them considerably easier to re-deploy without the cost and delay of constructing new concrete platforms. These were known as Pile platforms, after the head of Anti-Aircraft Command, General Frederick Alfred Pile.

In both cases, the saddle rotated 360° on the carriage or pedestal and provided elevation up to 80°. An AEC Matador was the normal gun tractor. There were six marks of ordnance (the barrel and breech assembly) and a few marks of carriage of both versions, some using letter suffixes. The carriage included the recoil system, laying arrangements, fuse setting and loading machinery. The Mk IIC mounting enabled fully automatic engagements, apart from putting shells into the feed to the machine fuze setter.

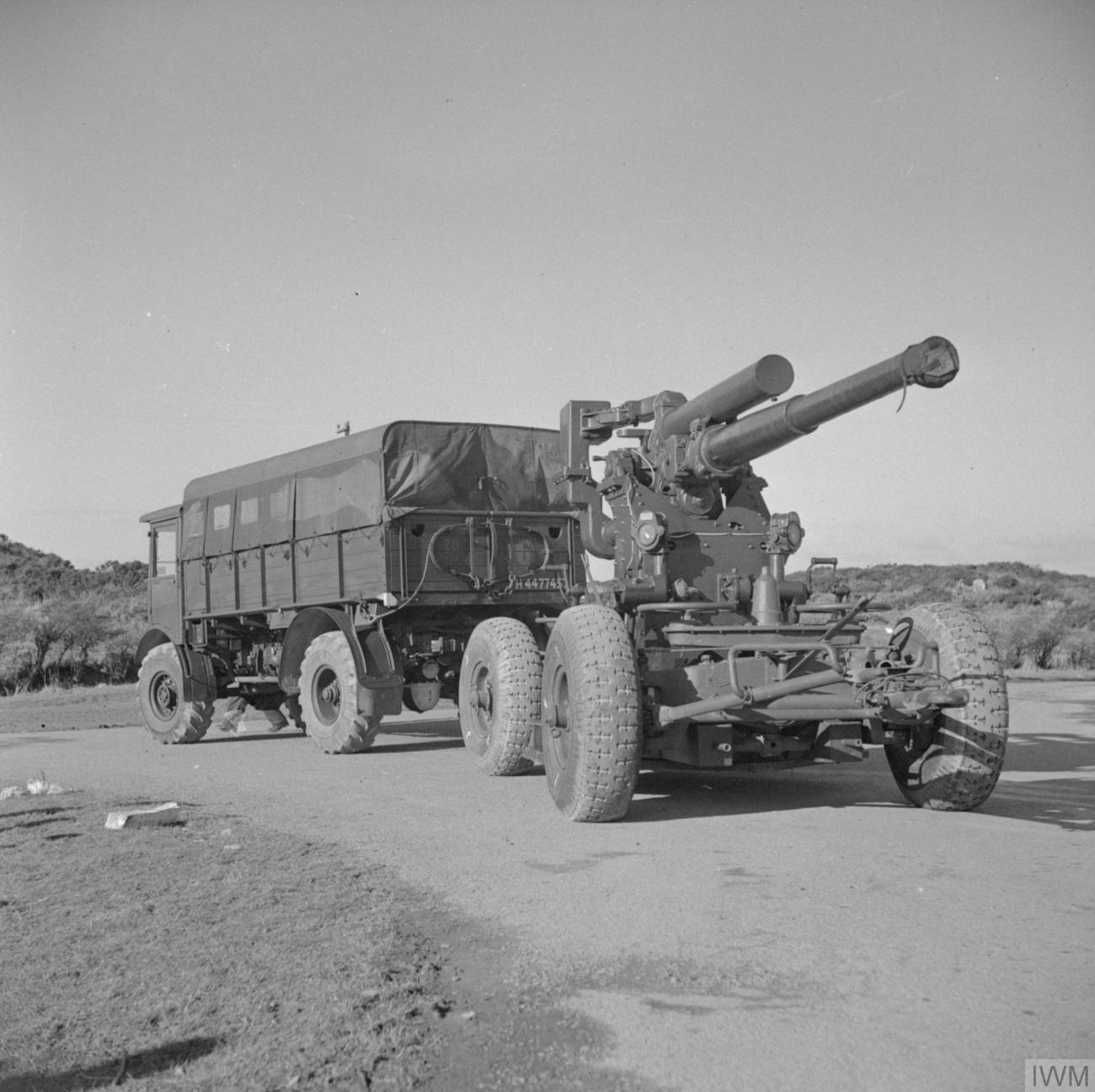
A 3.7-inch anti-aircraft gun towed by an AEC Matador at Burrow Head, Scotland, early 1944.

=== Ammunition ===
Initially, there were HE and shrapnel shells, both fitted with a time fuse. Fuse No.199 was igniferous (i.e. powder-burning) with a maximum running time of 30 seconds. Fuses No. 106 and 107 were mechanical time fuses; both proved unsatisfactory. Fuse No. 208, with a maximum running time of 43 seconds, became the standard fuse. A great improvement in 1942 was the introduction of Machine Fuse Setter No. 11, on Mounting Mk. IIC and Carriage Mk. IIIA, which raised the rate of fire to 20 rounds per minute. The introduction of the VT fuse later in the war further increased the gun's effectiveness, and was particularly useful against the V-1 flying bomb.

== Ordnance variants ==
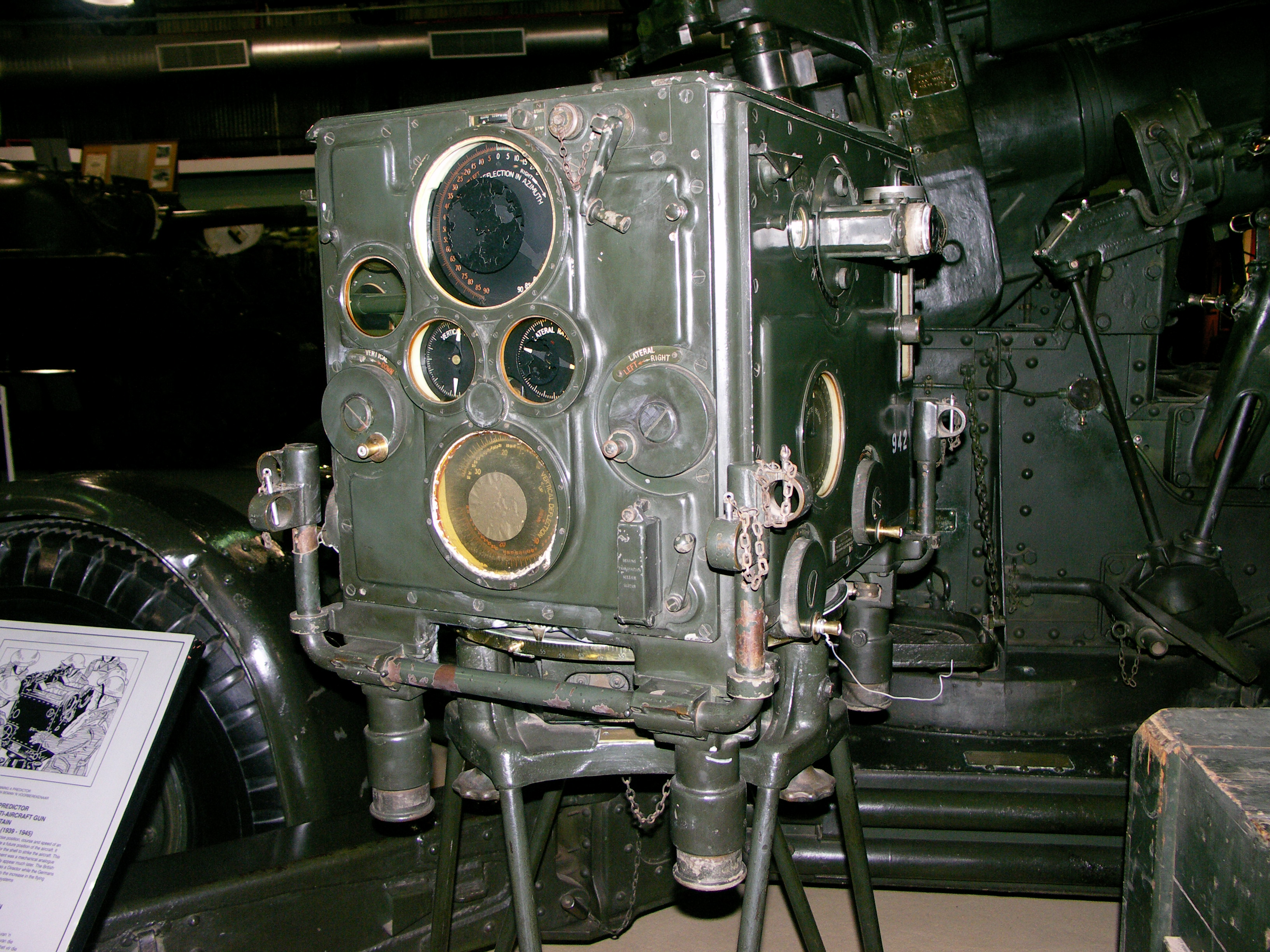
A No. 1 Mark III Predictor that was used with the QF 3.7

=== Mk I ===
Monobloc barrel.

=== Mk II ===
Barrel changed to loose liner.

=== Mk III ===
The Mk III started as a combination of the Mk I breech with the Mk II barrel.

=== Mk IV ===
A prototype development of the 3.7-inch gun using the QF 4.5-inch naval gun Mk V barrel with a liner to give a gun using a 4.45 inches (113 mm) size cartridge case to drive the 3.7 inches (94 mm) shell. The barrel wear proved excessive and it was dropped in favour of the Mk VI.

=== Mk V ===
Similar to the Mk IV. Also dropped in favour of the Mk VI.

=== Mk VI ===
Like the Mk IV this was based on the 4.5 inch barrel design lined down to 3.7 inches, and using the 4.5 inch size cartridge. However, Colonel Probert changed the barrel to have gradual rifling: the rifling groove depth decreased to zero over the last five calibres of the barrel before the muzzle. This smoothed the two driving bands of a new design shell giving reduced air resistance and hence better ballistic performance, and causing far less barrel wear. The maximum ceiling for the gun was about 15,240 m (50,000 ft). It was mounted on the Mounting Mk IIA and therefore deployed in static emplacements only. In service from 1944 to 1959.

As of 1949, erosive cordite propellant was not used with Mk 6 guns, but instead 17 lb and 2-6 oz of different single-base nitrocellulose propellant (as opposed to slightly over 7 lb 1 oz of cordite or around 8.5-9 lbs of single-base for Marks 1-3 guns).

== Performance ==
The gun's effective ceiling varied depending on the predictor and fuse. The Mk VI ordnance significantly increased the potential effective ceiling. The British definition of effective ceiling at the start of World War II was "that height at which a directly approaching target at 400 mph can be engaged for 20 seconds before the gun reaches 70° elevation"

Weapon	Predictor	Fuse	Effective ceiling
Mk III	No 1	No 199	23,500 feet (7,200 m)
Mk III	No 1	No 208	24,600 feet (7,500 m)
Mk III	No 2	No 208	25,300 feet (7,700 m)
Mk III	No 11	No 208	32,000 feet (9,800 m)
Mk VI	No 11	No 208	45,000 feet (14,000 m)

From 1943, radar direction of mechanically slaved 3.7" AA batteries was deployed in Kent. This was to address V1 bombs, which at that time flew from permanent launch sites. Batteries were sited to cover those routes and had good success.

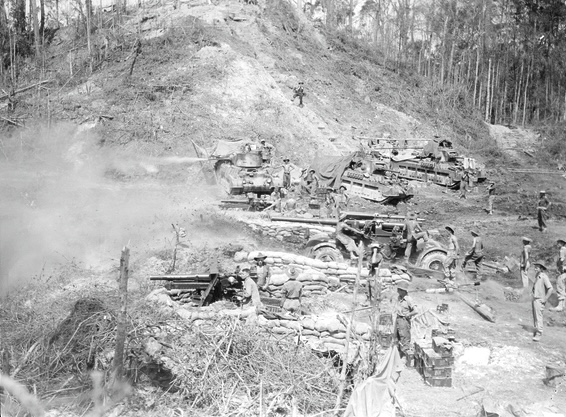
An Australian QF 3.7 inch gun (at centre) operating in the direct fire role during the Battle of Tarakan in 1945

Like other British guns, the 3.7 had a secondary direct fire role for defending its position against tank attack. During the North African Campaign, the 3.7 was considered for use explicitly as an anti-tank weapon due to the shortage of suitable anti-tank guns. Sighting arrangements were improved for the anti-tank role, but the weapon was far from ideal. Its size and weight - two tons heavier than the German Flak 8.8 cm - made it tactically unsuitable for use in forward areas. The mounting and recuperating gear were also not designed to handle the strain of prolonged firing at low elevations.

The 3.7 found little use as a dedicated anti-tank gun except in emergencies. There were few 3.7-equipped heavy anti-aircraft regiments in the field army and most were not subordinate to divisions where the anti-tank capability was required. The arrival of the smaller 76 mm (3-inch) calibre 17-pdr anti-tank gun finally obviated the need.

Like the rival Flak 8.8, the 3.7-inch also proved to be a useful high-velocity medium artillery piece. With the declining threat from the Luftwaffe in the later stages of the war, under-employed 3.7 units were called upon to supplement the field artillery in both the North West Europe and Italian theatres, where the accuracy and effectiveness of the 3.7 with mechanical Fuse 207 at ranges up to 20,000 yards (18,000 m) and all-round traverse was valued by artillery commanders. Using the 207 or VT fuse allowed the gunners to deliver precise airbursts above targets such as enemy batteries or mortar positions. However, repeated firing at low angles increased the wear on the gun and mounting. HAA units sometimes operated with the Army Groups Royal Artillery of medium and heavy guns, and were employed as siege artillery at the siege of Dunkirk. By the time of Operations Veritable and Plunder (the Rhine crossing) in early 1945, HAA regiments were fully integrated into corps-level fire plans.

Gordon Landsborough's novel of the North Africa Desert Campaign, Battery from Hellfire (1958) describes how an anti-aircraft battery finds itself improvising ways of defending itself as an anti-tank gun as German panzers pursue the retreating British forces. Landsborough had served in an anti-aircraft unit in North Africa and drew on his experiences for several war novels, including comparisons between the similar British 3.7 inch and the German 88 mm gun, both initially designed as anti-aircraft weapons.

== Use in armoured vehicles ==
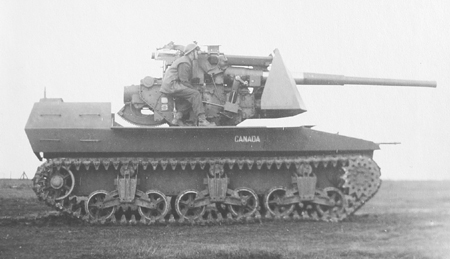
Ram 3.7 during testing

The Ordnance QF 32 pounder was developed from the 3.7-inch gun and armed the Tortoise heavy assault tank. Canada also experimented with mounting the 3.7-inch gun on the Ram tank chassis. Neither vehicle saw service. Another experimental derivative was the 28 pounder fitted to TOG2.

== Operators ==
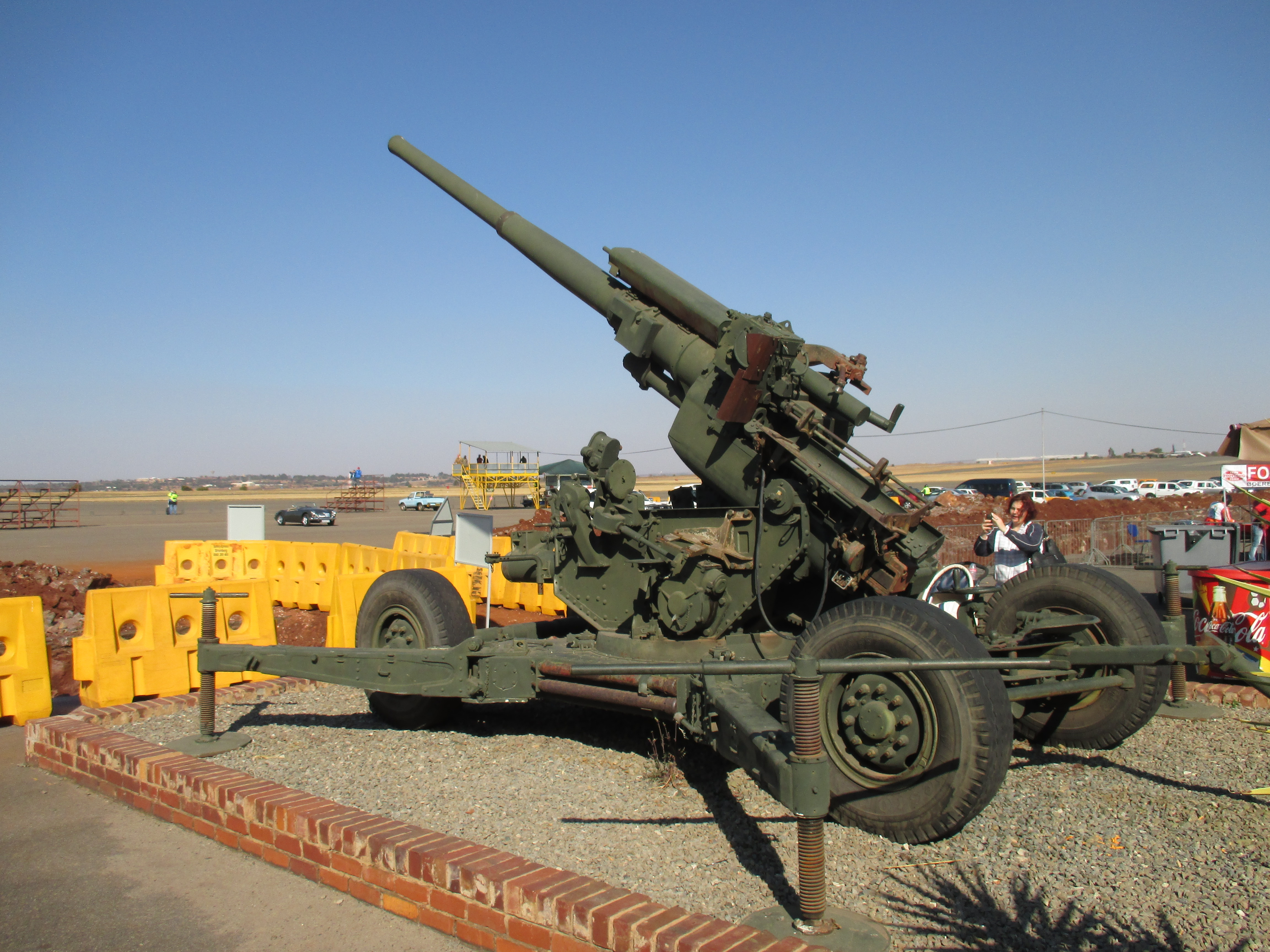
Surviving QF 3.7-inch AA position at Air Force Base Swartkop, South Africa

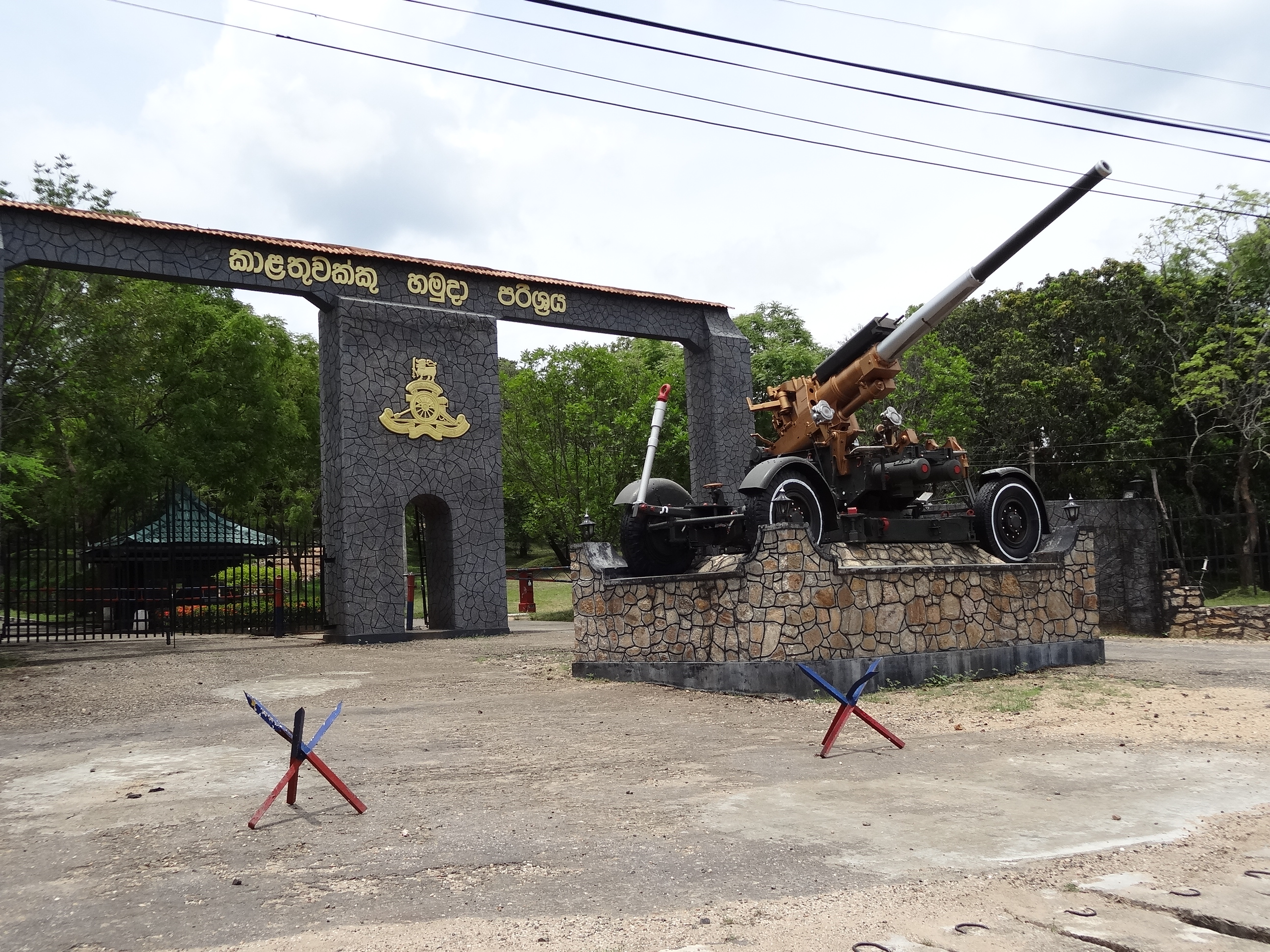
A QF 3.7-inch AA gun as a gate guardian at the Artillery Complex in Minneriya

- Australia
- Belgium: 12
- Canada
- Sri Lanka 24
- Cyprus
- India
- Ireland
- Israel
- Malta
- Nazi Germany: Unspecified number captured from British forces, as 94mm Flak Vickers M.39(e)
- Nepal: 45 still in service
- New Zealand: Royal New Zealand Artillery
- Pakistan Including 5th Heavy Anti-Aircraft Regiment after Partition.
- Union of South Africa
- Socialist Federal Republic of Yugoslavia
- United Kingdom
- Poland as part of the Polish II Corps within the British 8th Army
- Portugal

== Weapons of comparable role, performance and era ==
- 8.8 cm Flak 18/36/37/41 : contemporary German anti-aircraft gun, firing a lighter (20 pound) shell
- 90 mm Gun M1 : contemporary US anti-aircraft gun, firing a lighter (22 pound) shell
- Cannone da 90/53 : contemporary Italian anti-aircraft gun, firing a lighter (23 pound) shell
- 85 mm air defense gun M1939 (52-K) : contemporary Soviet anti-aircraft gun, firing a lighter (20 pound) shell
