= Ordnance QF 20-pounder =

British tank gun

Ordnance QF 20 pounder Mark I
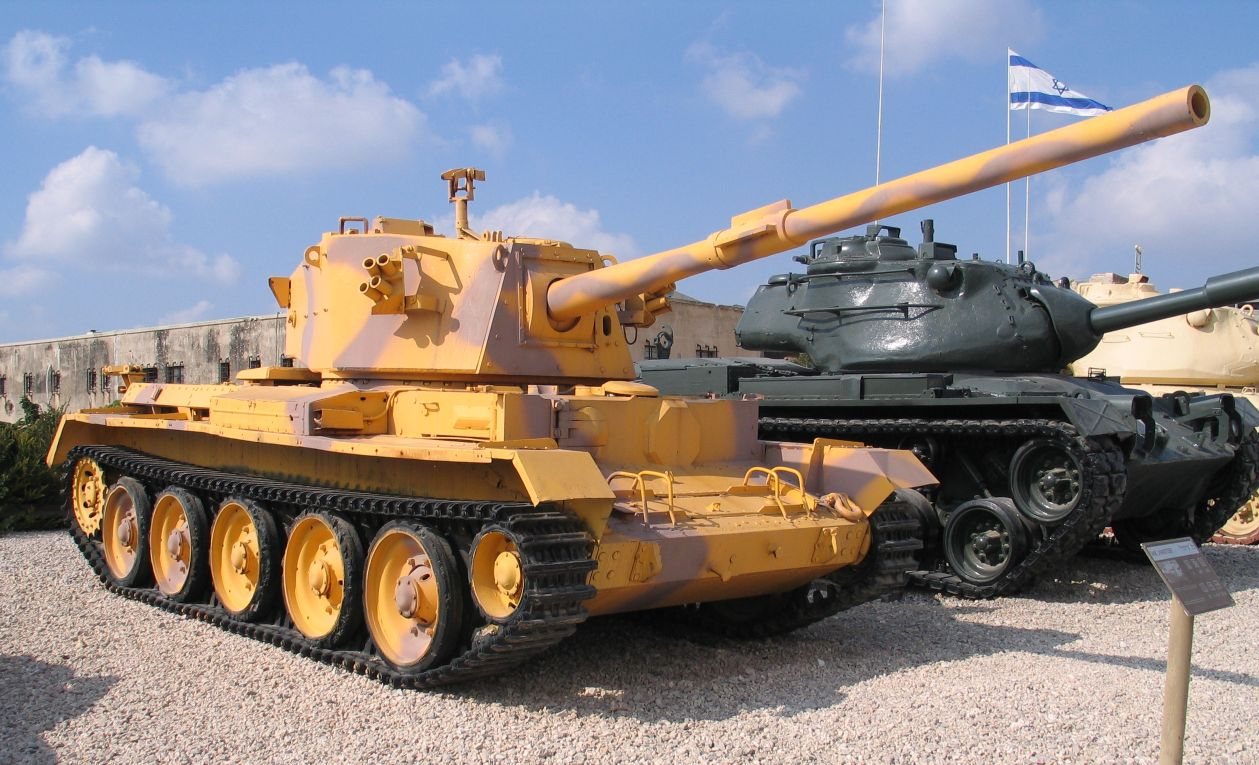
- Charioteer tank equipped with the 20 pounder. This gun is a later model which is fitted with a bore evacuator
- Type: Tank gun
- Place of origin: United Kingdom

Service history
- In service: 1948–1976
- Used by: United Kingdom; Australia; Austria; Canada; Finland; Israel; Jordan; Lebanon; South Africa
- Wars: Korean War; Vietnam War; Six-Day War; South African Border War

Specifications
- Barrel length: 226.4 in (5.75 m), 66.7 calibres
- Shell: 84×618mm R
- Calibre: 84 millimetres (3.31 in)
- Elevation: +18° to −10° in Centurion Mk 5

The Ordnance QF 20 pounder (known as 20 pounder, 20 pdr or simply 20-pr) was a British 84 mm (3.307 inch) tank gun. (Note: The gun is specified as 83.4 mm (3.283 in) here, while Ogorkiewiecz states the weapon was 83.8 mm. Norman gives it as "3.3 inch (84 mm)") It was introduced in 1948 and used in the Centurion main battle tank, Charioteer medium tank, and Caernarvon Mark II heavy tank. After the 20 pounder gun was found to have inadequate performance against the Soviet T-54, the gun was mostly replaced in service by the larger calibre 105 mm L7 gun.

== Design and development ==
The gun was developed by the Royal Ordnance Factories.

As fitted to the Charioteer, it ran through two models:

- Model A without a fume extractor.
- Model B with a fume extractor.

The L7 105 mm tank gun was developed from the 20 pounder. In 1954, the original version of the 105 mm was made by re-boring the tube of a 20 pounder barrel.

== Service history ==
The gun was fitted predominantly to the Centurion tank, first seeing action in 1950 with British Army units during the Korean War and Suez Crisis (1956).

In 1956, detailed intelligence on the then-new Soviet T-54A main battle tank was obtained by the British military, after Hungarian rebels drove to the British embassy in Budapest, during the Hungarian Revolution of 1956. Analysis of the T-54's armour suggested that the 20 pounder would be ineffective at penetrating the latest Soviet armour. The 100 mm gun wielded by the T-54 was also assessed. The Centurion's earliest combat experiences and intelligence on Soviet armour and tank guns led to development of the 105 mm L7 tank gun, which was designed to fit specifically into the turret mountings of the 20 pounder, facilitating retrofitting to existing tanks.

During the development of its successor, the 20 pounder continued in front-line service and was even trialed in other fighting vehicles. One was fitted to a Swiss pre-production Panzer 58, replacing a domestic 90 mm Kanone 1948 gun. (However, the Panzer 58 was later equipped with the 105 mm L7.)

Between 1968 and 1971, Mk 5/1 Centurions of the Australian Army, equipped with the original 20 pounder, saw action during the Vietnam War. In the context of counterinsurgency operations in South Vietnam, the 84 mm ammunition of the 20 pounder was considered suitable for the armoured fire support role. (North Vietnamese tanks did not operate in South Vietnam until later stages of the war.)

== Performance ==
The 20 pounder's APCBC projectile had an initial muzzle velocity of 1,020 metres per second and could penetrate 210 mm (8.3 in) of rolled homogeneous armour (RHA). However, these conventional rounds were rarely used.

The APDS projectile had a muzzle velocity of 1,465 m/s (4,810 ft/s) and the APDS Mk.3 could penetrate 330 mm (13 in) of RHA at a distance of 1,000 yards (910 m), and 290 mm (11 in) of penetration at 2,000 yards (1,800 m), equating to a line of sight penetration of 330 mm and 290 mm respectively. (Note: The 20 pounder's APDS round had twice the penetration capability of an KwK 36 8.8 cm AP round.) Against sloped armour, the APDS had reduced effectiveness: penetrating 87 mm (3.4 in) and 77 mm (3.0 in) of RHA at 1,000 yd (910 m) and 2,000 yd (1,800 m) respectively, against a plate angled 60 degrees from the normal, this is only 174 mm (6.9 in), and 154 mm (6.1 in) of line of sight penetration. At given ranges, the 20 pounder APDS Mk. III shot only had 53% of its line of sight penetration against a sloped plate, compared to at the normal. Line of sight penetration refers to a flat line drawn through a piece of sloped armour, indicating the effective thickness.

The 20-pounder could also fire high-explosive and canister shot shells.

== Ammunition ==
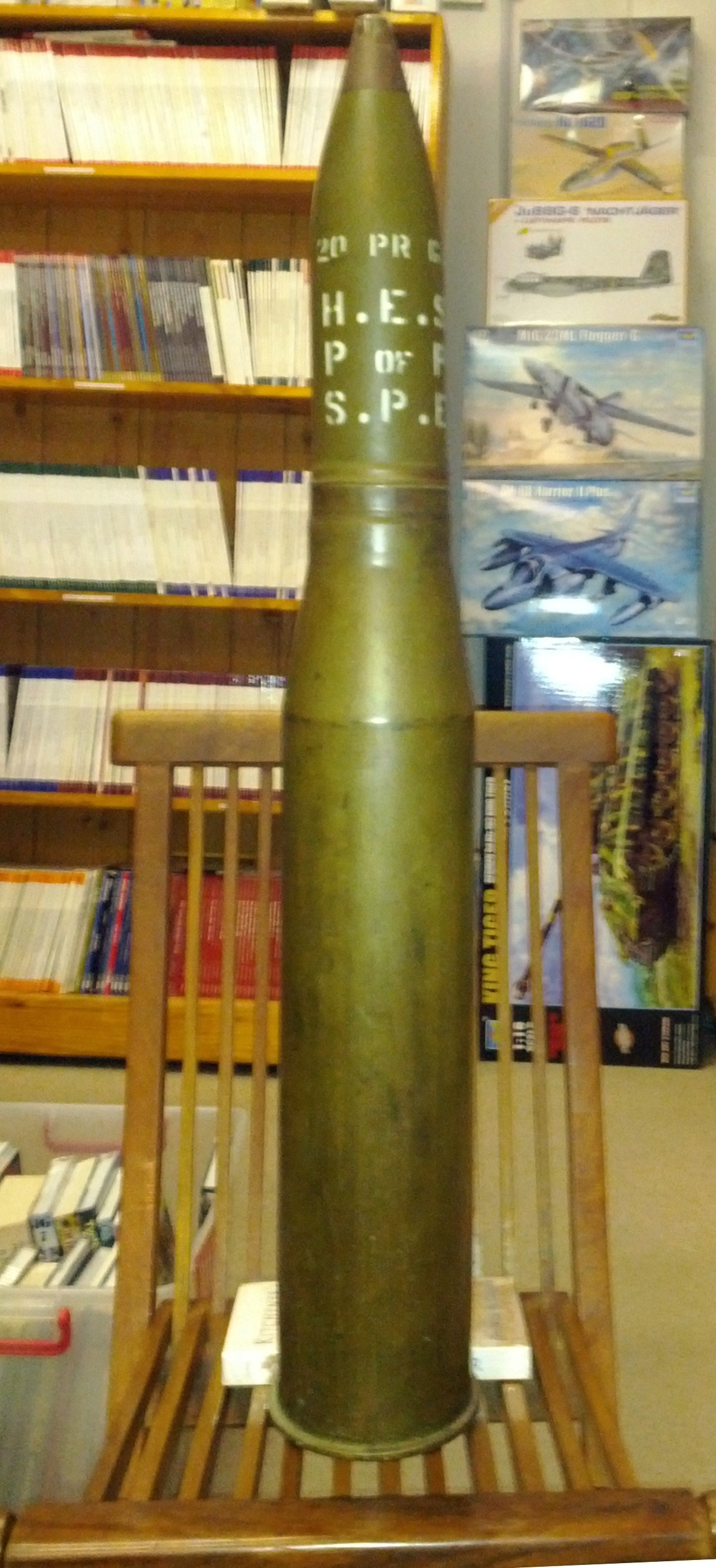
20 pdr HE round

- Shot Mk. 1 : an Armour-Piercing Capped Ballistic Capped (APCBC) round.
- APDS Mk. 1 : an Armour-Piercing Discarding Sabot round. It uses a nitrocellulose propellant (NH). The APDS Mk. 1 was fielded in 1947.
- DS/T PRAC Mk. 2 : a training variant of the APDS Mk. 1, it is identifiable by the yellow band painted on its black lead sabot. It uses a cordite propellant (WM).
- APDS-T Mk. 3 : an improved Armour-Piercing Discarding Sabot round fitted with tracer. The APDS-T Mk. 3 was fielded in 1950.
- DS/T PRAC Mk. 4 : a training variant of the APDS-T Mk. 3 except for mild steel sabot painted black with yellow band. The DS/T PRAC Mk. 4 was fielded in 1955.
- Shell Mk. 1 : a High-Explosive (HE) shell using a No. 410 Mk. 1 instantaneous fuze. The shell is painted olive drab or buff with red band and black RDX/BWX (explosive filler).
- SMK BE Mk. 1 : a smoke shell filled with three internal smoke canisters ejected by a Base Ejection (BE) device.
- CAN : a canister shot consisting of a black metal cylinder filled with 580 steel pellets (9.5 kg). It has an effective range of 229 m.

Designation	Weight, complete round	Projectile weight	Muzzle velocity
Shot Mk. 1	20.6 kg	/	1,000 m/s (3,300 ft/s) or 1,020 m/s (3,300 ft/s)
APDS Mk. 1	16.4 kg	4.52 kg (3.4 kg without sabot)	1,325 m/s (4,350 ft/s)
APDS-T Mk. 3	15.1 kg	/	1,430 m/s (4,700 ft/s) or 1,465 m/s (4,810 ft/s)
Shell Mk. 1	16 kg	/	600 m/s (2,000 ft/s) or 602 m/s (1,980 ft/s)
SMK BE Mk. 1	18 kg	9.3 kg	251 m/s (820 ft/s)
CAN	22.5 kg	9.5 kg	910 m/s (3,000 ft/s)

== Bibliography ==
- "Tank Effectiveness: Conqueror, Conway and Charioteer". opensource, p. 9. British Army Operational Research Group.
- Dunstan, Simon (2003). Centurion Universal Tank 1943-2003. Oxford, UK: Osprey Publishing. ISBN 1-84176-387-X..
- Ford, Roger (1997). The World's Great Tanks from 1916 to the present day. Brown Packaging Books Ltd. ISBN 1-897884-29-X.
- Norman, Michael (1967). Armour in Profile (Number 23), Centurion 5. Surrey: Profile Publications Ltd.
- Ogorkiewicz, Richard (1991). Technology of Tanks. London, UK: Jane's Information Group, Ltd. ISBN 0-7106-0595-1..
- Pugh, Stevenson (1962). Fighting Vehicles and Weapons of the Modern British Army. Macdonald & Co. OCLC 10010960.

== See also ==
- Pounds as a measure of cannon bore
- British standard ordnance weights and measurements
- Ordnance QF 32-pounder
