= 15 pounder =

15 pounder can refer to several British and US weapon systems:

- Ordnance BL 15 pounder
- Ordnance BLC 15 pounder
- Ordnance QF 15 pounder
- 3-inch gun M1903, also M1898 and M1902 seacoast guns
