= Batter (walls) =

Sloping walls or earthworks

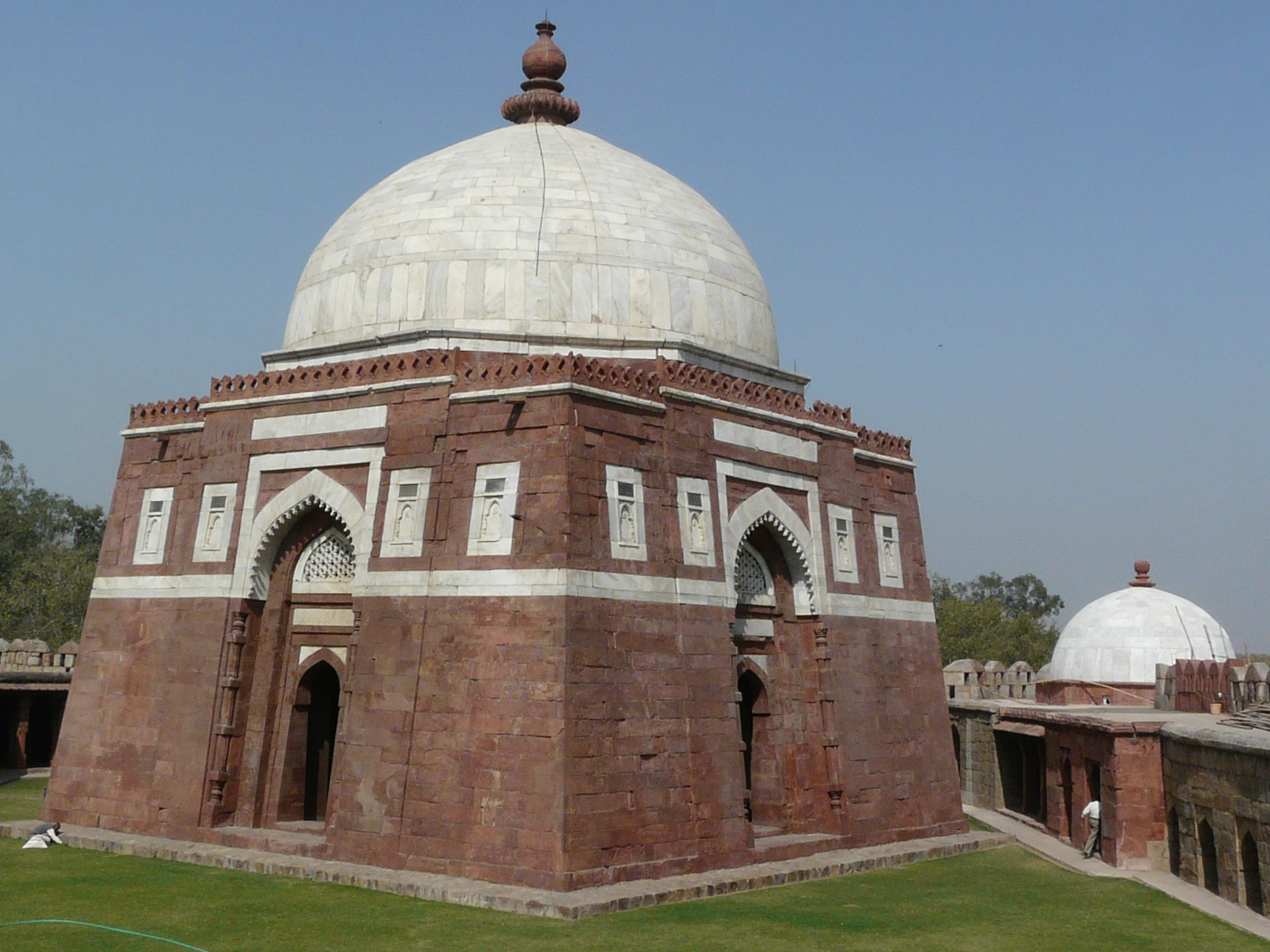
Tomb of Ghiyath al-Din Tughluq (d. 1325), Delhi, with a batter of 25°.

In architecture, batter is the receding slope of a wall, structure, or earthwork, the opposite of an overhang. When used in fortifications it may be called a talus.

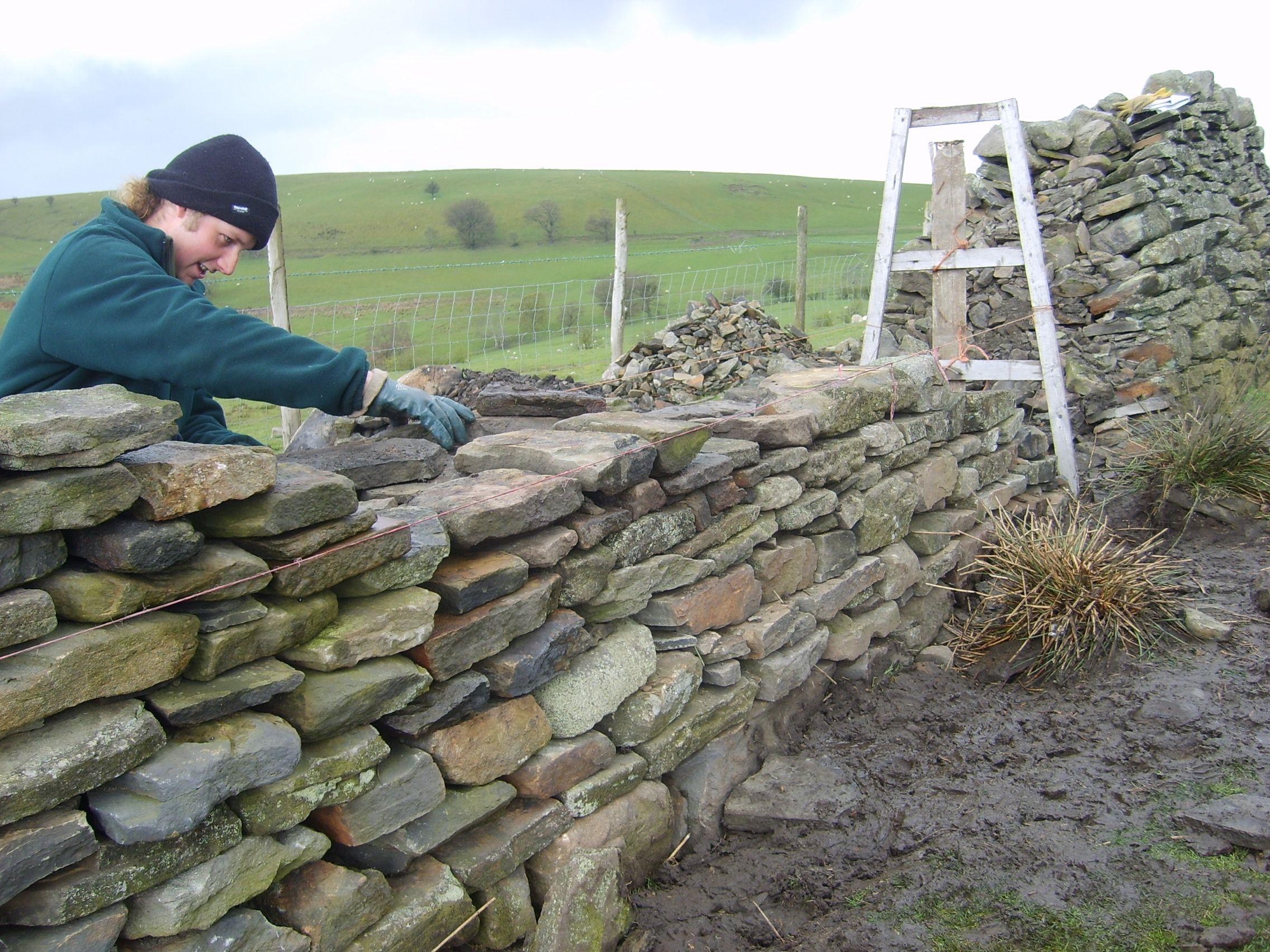
A batter frame is used to guide the construction of a battered dry stone wall.

A battered corner is an architectural feature using batters. A batter is sometimes used to reinforce the stability of foundations, retaining walls, dry stone walls, dams, lighthouses, and fortifications. Other terms that may be used to describe battered walls are "inclined”, “tapered" and "flared".

Battering allows for a wide stable base and both more economic use of material through tapering and a proportional minimalization of the wall’s foundation. The batter angle is typically described either as a ratio of the offset and height or a degree angle. The amount of allowable batter is dependent on the building materials and application. For example, typical dry-stone retaining walls step back 1 foot for every 6 feet of rise, a 1:6 ratio, or just under 9.5°.

== Historical uses ==
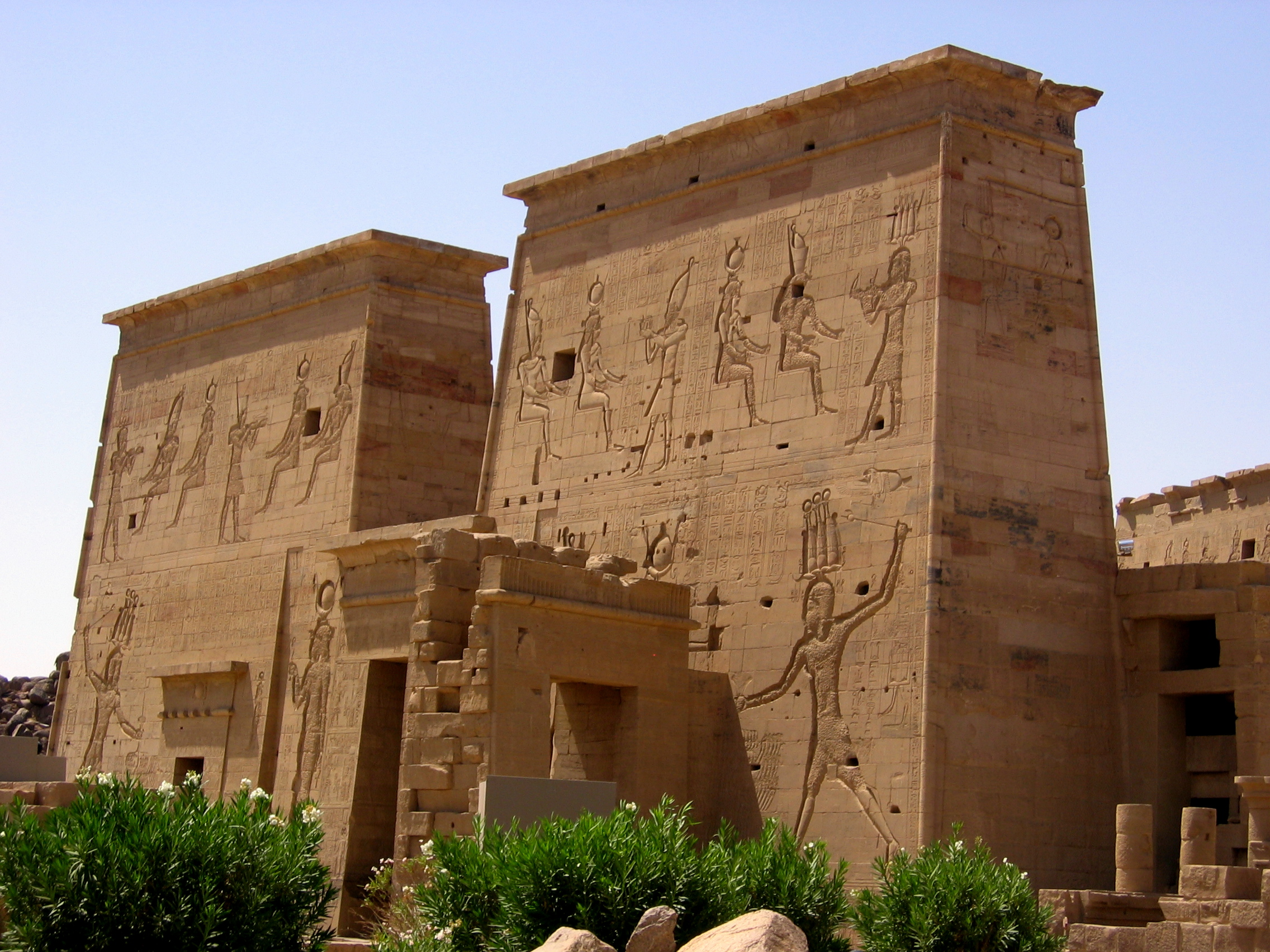
Ancient Egyptian pylons were often battered.

Walls may be battered to provide structural strength or for decorative reasons. In military architecture, battering made walls harder to undermine or tunnel under, and provided some defense against artillery, especially early siege engine projectiles and cannon; sloping both decreases the angle of impact and increases the total amount of material used for protection within a given height. Both principles – enhanced energy dissipation and increased thickness over a given vertical dimension – are applied to modern sloped armor. Also, siege towers were held off from the top of a strongly battered wall.

Types of fortification using batters included the talus and glacis (adopted in the modern glacis plate).

== Examples ==
=== Asia ===
Architectural styles that often include battered walls as a stylistic feature include Indo-Islamic architecture, where it was used in many tombs and some mosques, as well as many forts in India. Tughlaqabad Fort in Delhi is a good example, built by Ghiyath al-Din Tughluq, whose tomb opposite the fort (illustrated above) also has a strong batter. In Hindu temple architecture, the walls of the large Gopurams of South India are usually battered, often with a slight concave curve.

In the Himalayan region, battered walls are one of the typifying characteristics of traditional Tibetan architecture. With minimal foreign influence over the centuries, the region's use of battered walls are considered to be an indigenous creation and part of Tibet's vernacular architecture. This style of batter wall architecture was the preferred style of construction for much of Inner-Asia, and has been used from Nepal to Siberia. The 13-story Potala Palace in Lhasa, is one of the best known examples of this style and was named a UNESCO World Heritage Site in 1994.

=== Middle East ===
Battered walls are a common architectural feature found in Ancient Egyptian architecture. Usually constructed from mud brick for residential applications, limestone, sandstone, or granite was used mainly in the construction of temples and tombs. In terms of monumental architecture, the Giza pyramid complex in Cairo utilized different grades of battered walls to achieve great heights with relative stability. The Pyramid of Djoser is an archeological remain in the Saqqara necropolis, northwest of the city of Memphis that is a quintessential example of battered walls used in sequence to produce a step pyramid.

=== North Americas ===
In the Americas, battered walls are seen as a fairly common aspect of Mission style architecture, where Spanish design was hybridized with Native American adobe building techniques. As exemplified by the San Estevan del Rey Mission Church in Acoma, New Mexico, c.1629-42, the heights desired by Spanish Catholic Mission design was achieved through battering adobe bricks to achieve structural stability.

== Gallery ==
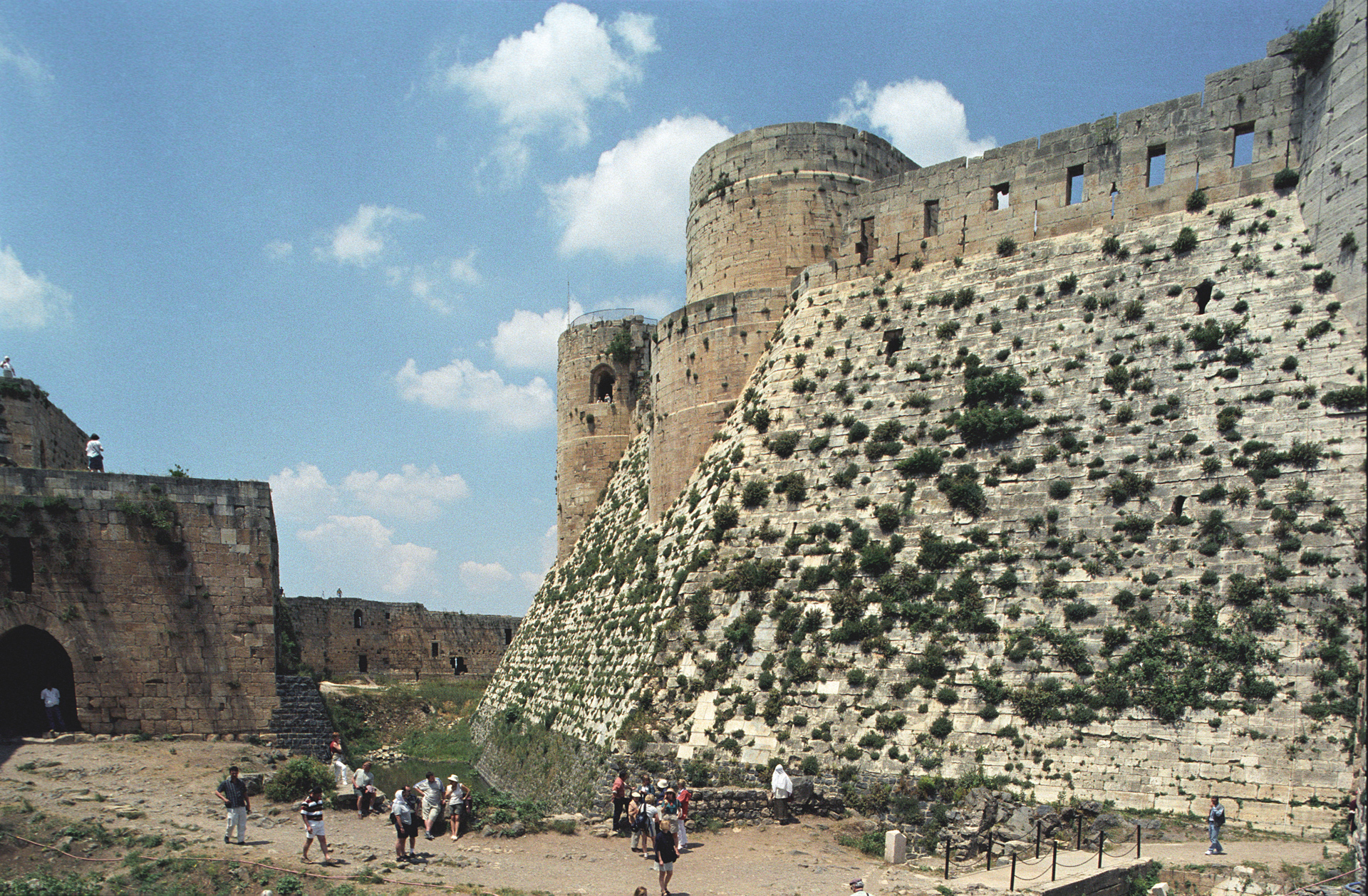
The Krak des Chevaliers in Syria, with a tall and clearly defined talus

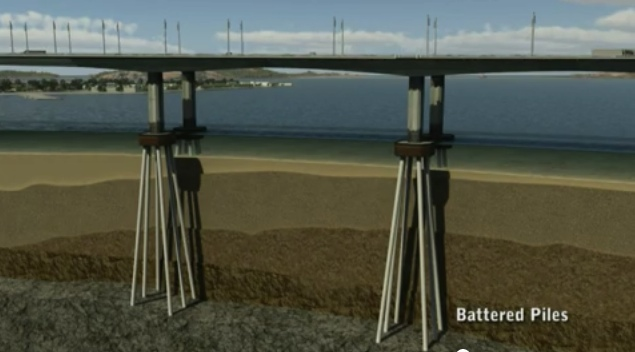
Battered pilings

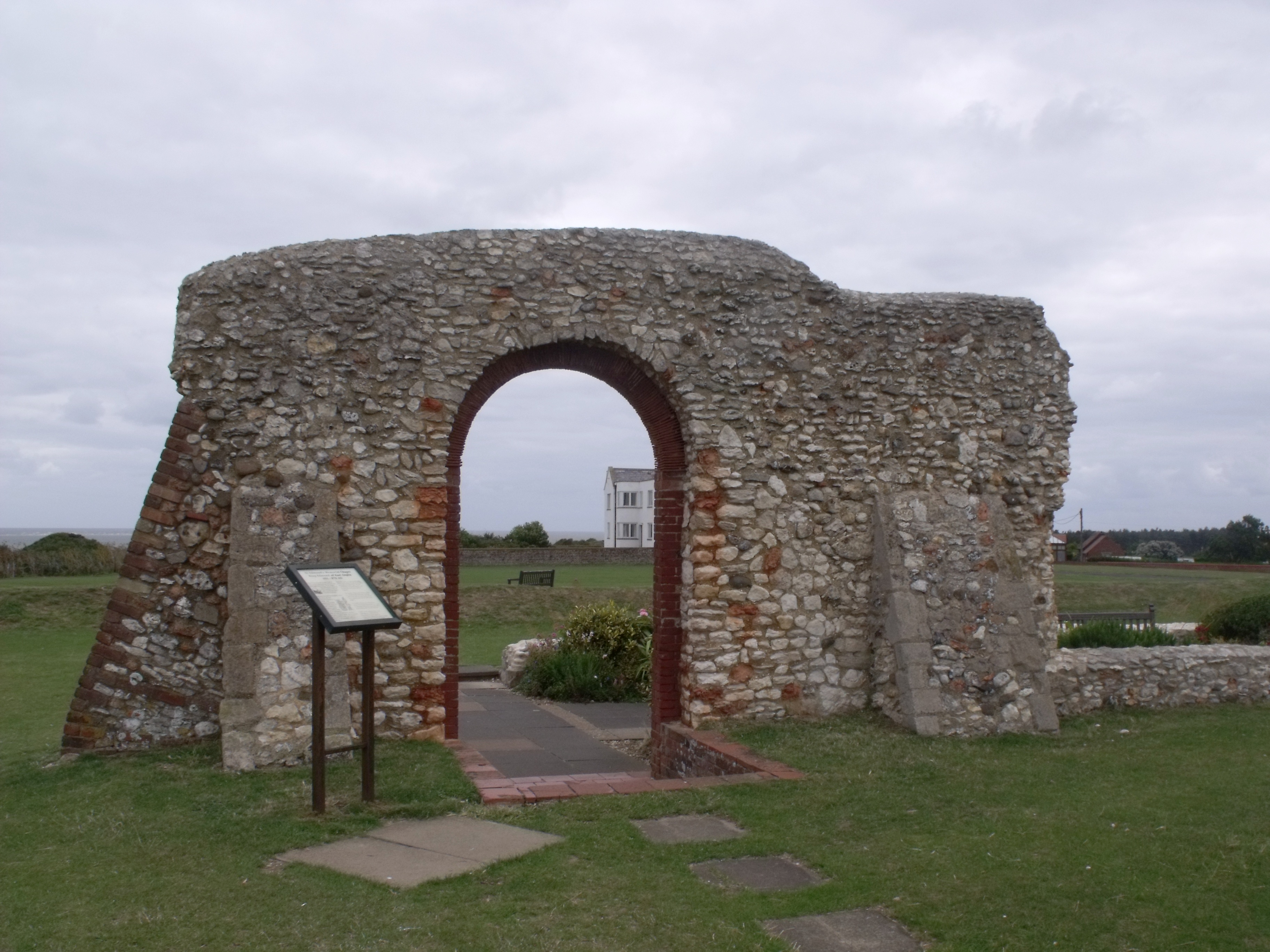
Added battered buttressing reinforces this wall fragment

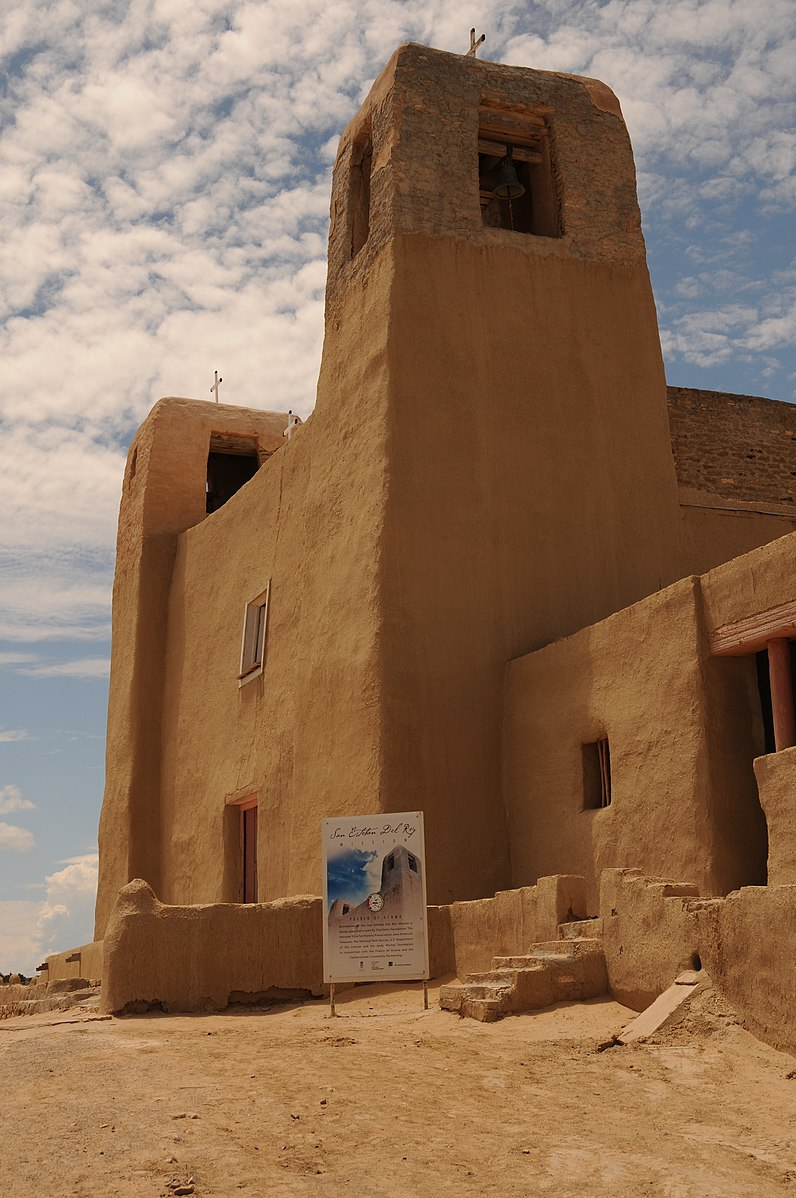
San Estévan del Rey Mission Church, Acoma, New Mexico

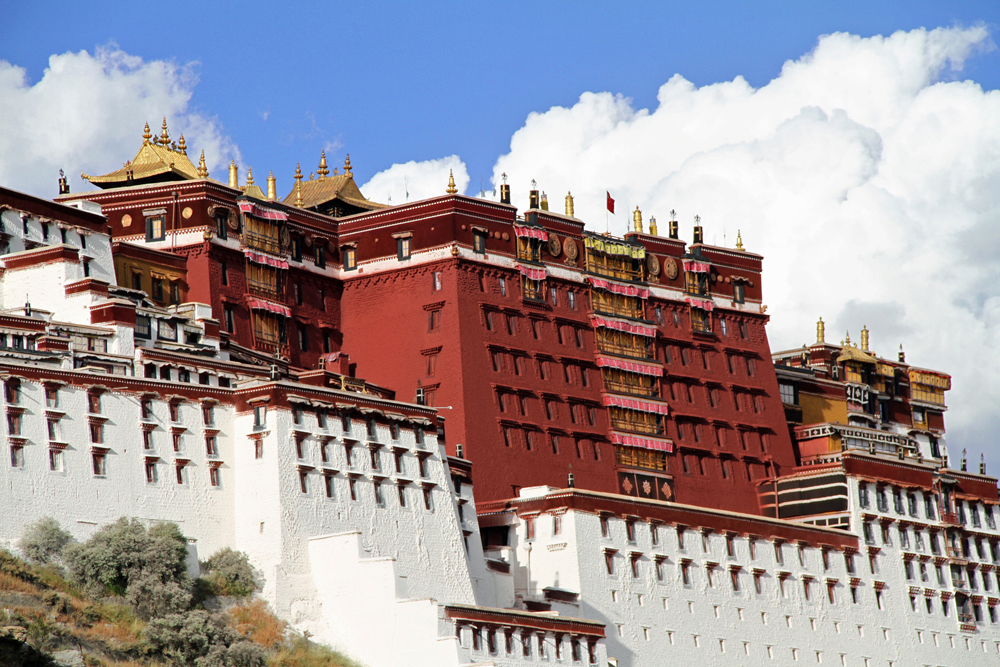
Potala Palace, Tibet. UNESCO World Heritage Site
