= M39 Pantserwagen =

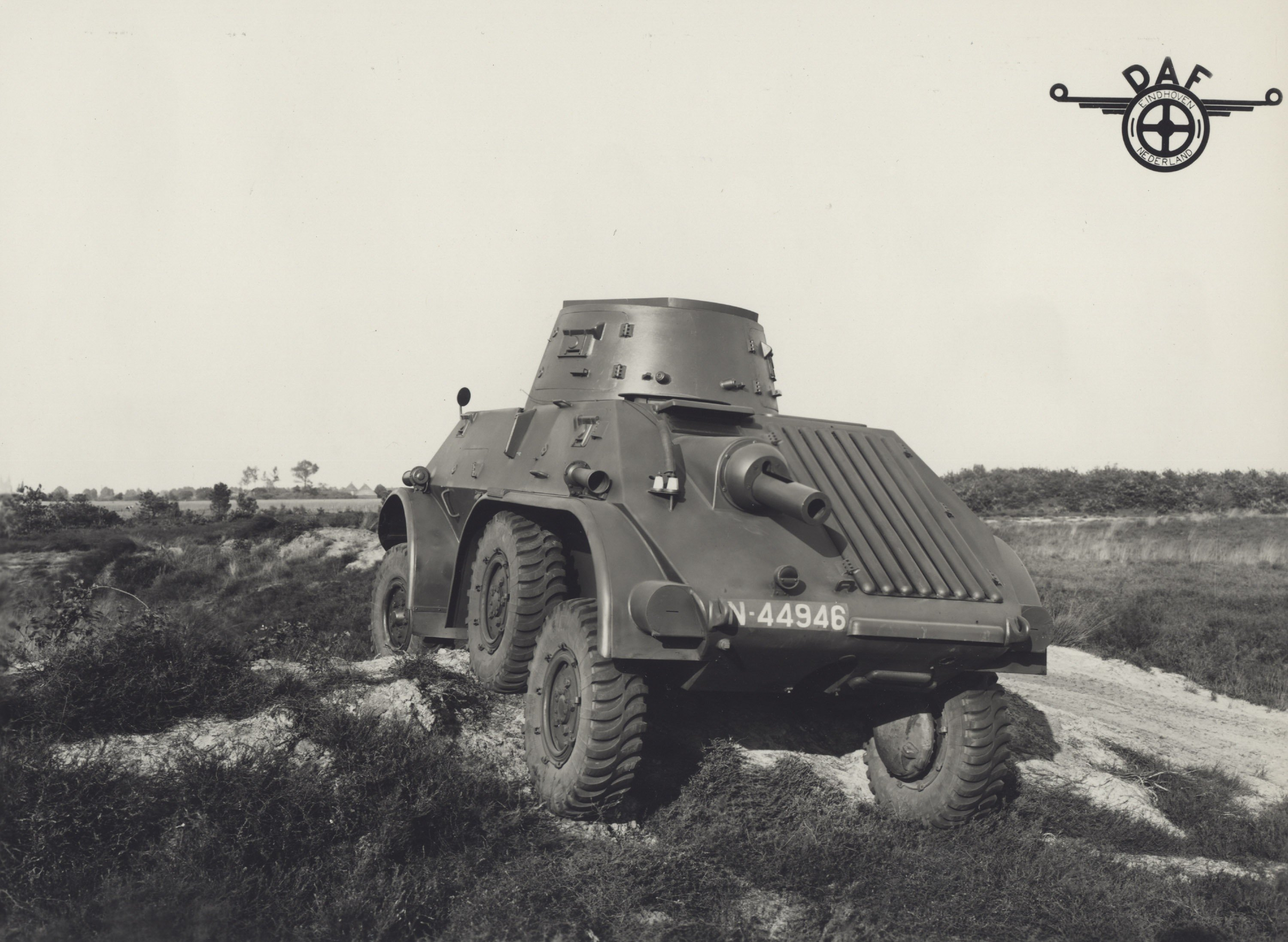
- DAF M.39 "Pantrado 3" seen from behind
- Type: Armoured car
- Place of origin: Netherlands

Service history
- In service: 1939–1944
- Used by: Netherlands; Germany
- Wars: World War II

Production history
- Designed: 1938
- Manufacturer: DAF
- Unit cost: 44,133 guilders per hull
- Produced: November 1939 — May 1940
- No. built: 12 plus prototype
- Variants: DAF M40

Specifications
- Mass: 5.8 tonnes
- Length: 4.75 m (15 ft 7 in)
- Width: 2.08 m (6 ft 10 in)
- Height: 2.16 m (7 ft 1 in)
- Crew: 5
- Armour: 5-10 mm
- Main armament: 37 mm Bofors cannon
- Secondary armament: 2× 7.92 mm Paw m-20 No.1 Lewis machine gun 1× 7.92 mm Paw m-20 No.2 modified Lewis machine gun
- Engine: Ford Mercury V8; 95 hp
- Power/weight: 16.4 hp/ton
- Suspension: leaf and helical springs (TRADO rear suspension)
- Ground clearance: 40 cm
- Fuel capacity: 85 litres
- Operational range: 200 -225 km
- Maximum speed: 75 km/h (47 mph) forwards 50 km/h (31 mph) backwards

The Pantserwagen M39 or DAF Pantrado 3 was a Dutch 6×4 armoured car produced in the late 1930s for the Royal Dutch Army.

From 1935 the DAF automobile company designed several armoured fighting vehicles based on its innovative Trado truck suspension system. Among these was the Pantrado 2, an armoured car. From 1936 the Dutch military encouraged DAF to develop this type into the Pantrado 3, a design more closely meeting army specifications for a reconnaissance vehicle, in order to establish a small indigenous armoured vehicle production capacity. A prototype was built and in early 1939 twelve vehicles were ordered of the DAF M39 type, the last of which was delivered in January 1940. The vehicles were destined to equip reconnaissance platoons of four cavalry hussar regiments.

For its time the DAF M39 was a modern design with an all-welded monocoque construction of the hull and extensive use of sloped armour. The turret, fitted with a relatively powerful 37 mm cannon, was produced in Sweden by Landsverk. The type was lightly armoured and relatively fast, with a good cross-country capability. It had been intended to build a second series of an improved type with 6 × 6 drive, the DAF M40, but production preparations were interrupted by the German attack during the Second World War.

When the Netherlands were invaded on 10 May 1940, no operational unit had yet been equipped with the type. The crews had not finished their training yet and the vehicles themselves had not all been completed due to delays in the fitting of the armament and repairs necessary because the welded armour plates proved prone to cracking. Therefore only three DAF M39s actually participated in the fighting, in ad hoc-units, engaging German airborne troops and landed transport planes. After the Dutch defeat, German combat units would for several years employ the captured vehicles under the designation Panzerspähwagen DAF 201 (h), some of them upgraded by DAF, until gradually losing them all on the Eastern Front.

After the war there were plans to restart production, building two hundred vehicles for Dutch reconnaissance units and perhaps a number for Belgium, but eventually it was decided to use light tanks for this role instead.

== Background ==
In 1937 the quickly deteriorating international situation urged the Dutch government to speed up its 1936 modernisation programme for the Dutch armed forces. In view of the limited budget available for armoured vehicles, Chief of Staff Lieutenant-General Izaak H. Reijnders decided that most funds should be dedicated to the acquisition of tanks. Therefore the existing number of twelve Swedish Landsverk 181 (named M36 in Dutch service) armoured cars, equipping a single squadron, should only be expanded with a dozen more for a second squadron, two additional vehicles to function as command cars for each squadron, twelve vehicles to provide a platoon of three for the reconnaissance unit, a motorised cavalry Hussar regiment, of each of the four infantry corps and finally ten vehicles to be used as matériel reserve and for training: 36 new armoured cars in total.

Fourteen Landsverk 180 (M38) vehicles were received between 16 March and 11 November 1938 to equip the second squadron and as command cars; however the Dutch in 1937 also tried to reduce their dependency on foreign manufacturers — especially Sweden, the armour industry of which country was known to have close informal ties with Germany — by employing their own small truck industry, the DAF company.

The army had in 1935 first suggested to DAF to produce some British type under licence. Although officially the Netherlands adhered to a policy of the strictest neutrality, it was hoped that by secret negotiations it could be arranged that the British would send an expeditionary force in case of a German attack and that some communality of equipment would facilitate such future cooperation. Also the army considered British armoured cars to be the best available. However, it transpired that DAF had already developed an indigenous design, which it claimed to be more advanced than any British armoured car.

== Development ==
=== The Pantrado 1 and 2 ===
From 1935, the co-founder of DAF Hub van Doorne and captain engineer Piet van der Trappen had started a number of armoured fighting vehicle paper projects based on their Trado suspension system. The Trado, named after themselves (Trappen — Doorne), consisted of a leaf-springed bogie with two actuated road wheels that could be easily attached to, driven by and rotate on the back axis of any commercial truck, thus adding a "walking beam" to the vehicle that significantly improved its cross-country performance. The Trado III suspension system, an improved version, was a considerable commercial success and applied to many existing and new civilian and military truck types. The armoured vehicle projects had the designation Pantrado in common, a contraction of the Dutch word for "armoured car", Pantserwagen, and Trado.

The Trado III-suspension could be fitted with a track on the lines of the Kégresse track, changing a vehicle into a half-track. The first project, the Pantrado 1, envisaged a very long type with a good trench-crossing capability, brought about by applying the principle of the articulated vehicle: it was to consist of two fully tracked truck hulls attached back to back, connected by a large horizontal articulated cylinder. The full track was to be achieved by extending the track over the rubber-tired front wheels. The cylinder could be split, creating two tanks, each with the engine in front and the fighting room, crowned by a gun turret, at the back. This type remained a paper project only.

The second project, the Pantrado 2, was initiated by DAF after it had become clear to them in 1935 that a second batch of armoured cars would soon be procured by the Dutch Army. In February 1936 they submitted a design of a double-ended small 6 × 4 armoured car/half-track, with a transversely mounted engine and a crew of four, to the Commissie Pantserautomobielen, the army commission tasked with selecting possible candidates. The commission initially was very negative about the type. It concluded in May 1936 that the car had simply been designed around the Trado-suspension without regard for ergonomics or fighting abilities. In its rejection the commission was joined by the Inspector of Cavalry, who in June pointed out to the minister of defence that the mere fact that the Pantrado 2 had yet to be developed, precluded any procurement. However, this occasioned the Commander of the Field Army to add a comment emphasizing that it would nevertheless be very desirable to have a home-made armoured car, especially if it were equipped with a Ford engine, as a Ford factory and an extensive Ford service network were already present in the country. In July the Chief of General Staff concurred with this assessment. In response to these views by high-ranking officers, the commission changed its opinion, now officially concluding that "acceptable concepts" had been expressed by the DAF proposal and suggesting DAF might build a prototype. The delay in its report was explained by the great interest the new design had awakened with the commission members!

Meanwhile Van der Trappen himself had defended his proposal by writing an article in the authoritative Dutch military magazine De Militaire Spectator, claiming it was much more modern, especially more compact, than the Swedish Landsverk types. In September even the Dutch steel industry began to lobby for the DAF design. Despite the political pressure the minister of defence in October 1936 decided to reject the Pantrado 2. However, he promised that a complete list of specifications would be provided to DAF, outlining the qualities the Dutch Army desired for any future armoured car design. These included: a weight limit of 6.5 tonnes; six wheels; a maximum speed of 70 km/h; a power/weight ratio of 15 hp/ton; an armament consisting of a 37/40 mm gun and three machine guns; a complete protection against any munition below 10 mm calibre; a dual drive capacity; a half-track option; a 6x6 drive; bulletproof tyres; a range of three hundred kilometres; good yet safe visibility; an emitter-receiver radio set; gas-proof armour; gun stabilisation; a smoke screen capacity and a searchlight.

=== The Pantrado 3 ===
Having received the specifications in November 1936, DAF immediately began the third project, the Pantrado 3, a somewhat larger vehicle than the Pantrado 2. Construction of a boiler plate demonstrator vehicle was begun in the spring of 1937. The construction process was inspected in May by the Dutch prime minister Hendrik Colijn who at the time was also interim minister of defence. DAF submitted the first blueprints and a scale model to the commission in July. These showed a number of deviations from the specifications: the design dispensed with the track option entirely and was a pure armoured car. The front wheels were not driven and normal rubber tyres were used. In August 1937 the commission advised that a single prototype would be ordered; Van Doorne and Van der Trappen had indicated that the demonstrator vehicle was in an advanced stage of manufacture and could quickly be completed as an official prototype.

The claim to superiority to British design had been based on the use of a welded monocoque construction combined with a consistent use of the sloped armour principle, which was predicted to lead to a much improved weight efficiency. It would therefore not use an existing truck chassis as was common for contemporary armoured cars. However, DAF in the same period did design such more conventional armoured cars, including two proposals for a Ford truck modified into an armed command car, and equipped with the Trado IV-suspension, a Trado system optimised for lighter vehicles. Also an extremely flat, eighty centimetres high, one-man armoured car was designed, armed with a single machine-gun in the hull, on the lines of certain British tankette-types from the 1920s.

Neither Van Doorne nor Van der Trappen had any experience with building armoured vehicles. Besides employing a small DAF-team, they had the assistance of their personal friend, wachtmeester (a Dutch cavalry rank equivalent to sergeant) and mechanic J. Addink. He was very sceptical of the monocoque design, predicting that without reinforcement the thin plates would crack at their connection welds. Van Doorne however, decided against compromising a main design principle.

In April 1938, just eight months after the order, the prototype was finished. It was presented to a delegation of the Ordnance Department which was much impressed. In May the prototype was presented to the Commissie Pantserautomobielen. It demanded that a test programme would be quickly completed because it was intended to order new armoured cars before the end of 1938 to be able to begin equipping units in 1940 as planned. The design was intended to use the Swedish Landsverk turret as there was no Dutch manufacturer capable of producing light guns in the 25 – 40 mm range and it would be more efficient to have a single armoured car gunnery training programme. As no new turret was at the moment available, DAF had made a dummy, an almost exact replica of both armour and weaponry. For test purposes this dummy turret was again removed and replaced with a turret taken from a M36 vehicle. Tests were carried out between 4 July and 23 September 1938 by the 1e Eskadron Pantserwagens, a unit based in North Brabant, comparing it with their regular Landsverk M36. Various terrain types and obstacles had to be negotiated. The results were very favourable for the Pantrado 3. Whereas the M36 was incapable of crossing ditches, would get itself stuck on dry sand roads and had great trouble climbing steep slopes, the Pantrado 3 effortlessly overcame these obstacles. Its suspension system allowed for a much smoother cross-country ride. The main drawback was that the gasproof monocoque hull trapped both heat and noise. This affected crew comfort and it was impossible for the crew members to hear each other. Also on one occasion the Ford V8 engine overheated but this was shown to have been caused by using an outdated cooling system that the Ford company had already replaced on its production lines; subsequently the newer version was installed. A minor negative point was that the exhaust pipe had been fitted on the bottom and easily was damaged in terrain. Nevertheless the commission, clearly impressed by the general performance and the modern exterior, already on 9 September judged the type to be "very acceptable".

On some points however, the commission was still dissatisfied. Firstly, it insisted on a front-wheel drive. As deliveries would be delayed by its development, it was accepted that the first batch would lack this feature, but possible later batches should have an improved 6x6 drive system. A second improvement seen as necessary was the use of bulletproof tyres of the Cellastic cushion type. Since these would increase resistance by about 20%, a presumed stronger Ford 125 hp Lincoln-Zephir V8 engine should be installed. Minor changes included a coupled dual drive, an improved differential, a rubber-suspended engine block, improved ventilation and adjustable seats. DAF tested the Cellastic tyres in October; it was shown that performance did not suffer but that the tyres themselves were prone to deformation after long periods of high speed driving. For this reason it was decided to postpone the choice of tyre type.

After the favourable report was received by him in September, the minister of defence in November ordered the Ordnance Department to conclude a final contract with DAF, reaching an agreement on the desired changes. The negotiations soon ran into some unexpected problems. No improved differential type was available and the assumed Ford 125 hp Lincoln-Zephir V8 engine did not even exist, the commission having misidentified the Ford 112 hp V12 engine. Also no choice could be made for a specific armour manufacturer. In January 1939 the minister urged the Ordnance Department to make greater haste, at the same time determining the number for the first batch at twelve vehicles. Subsequently it was decided to fit the new Ford 95 hp V8 Mercury engine and to order armour plates from the Belgian steel manufacturer Ougrée Marihaye.

Early May 1939 the contract was signed for twelve units of the "P.T.3" or "M.39", to be delivered before 15 December 1939. DAF would only manufacture the hulls but also be responsible for the final assembly, using turrets to be delivered by Landsverk and armament to be supplied by the Ordnance Department. By 1 August, 16 September, 7 October and 1 November 1939 respectively three turrets each had to be made available. The intended delivery dates were: the first car on 15 September, the next two on 10 October, three on 1 November, three more on 23 November and the final three on 15 December 1939. The total price was 529,600 guilders; the prototype was to be delivered by 15 December at the latest, and for free.

Later in May twelve turrets were ordered from AB Landsverk for a total price of 218,400 Swedish Krona via the official intermediary of this company in The Netherlands, the NV Rollo, based in The Hague. As the Ordnance Department needed some time to fit these with armament, the agreed Swedish delivery dates predated the delivery to DAF: on 23 June, 9 August, 1 September and 23 September 1939 three turrets each. The actual delivery seems to have been delayed somewhat: the corresponding order 55340/41 is marked as completed in the Landsverk order book on 28 September 1939. Landsverk stipulated that in all sales brochures of the type it should be mentioned that the turret was of Swedish manufacture. DAF circumvented this clause by depicting the demonstrator vehicle fitted with the dummy turret. This vehicle was in July shown to the general public during a large Army exhibition in The Hague.

== Production ==
As DAF had never before produced armoured fighting vehicles, the planned interval of just four months between order and the first delivery had been very optimistic. Production was soon delayed, largely because components were not made available on time. Ougrée Malhaye could only send the armour sets five to seven weeks later than DAF had expected. The electrical components had been ordered from the German manufacturer Bosch but their delivery stagnated after the outbreak of war on 1 September. France halted export of military goods at the start of the war, including the prismatic episcopes and visors intended to be fitted in the M39. The Dutch Philips company started a crash programme for production of a suitable prism but this would take several months to come into effect. The worst delay was caused by changed Army specifications for the machine gun mounts; these had been received by DAF in April and new drawings were only ready in August. The special steel pieces again had to be produced by Ougrée Malhaye, but the only steel oven capable of casting them happened to be in revision for several months. In November the entire production process was halted for some weeks because of the Venlo Incident: the German Abwehr had abducted two British intelligence officers from Dutch territory and it was feared that the Dutch protests regarding the incident would be used as a pretext to invade The Netherlands; all vehicles were temporarily evacuated to Rotterdam, as Eindhoven, where DAF was based, was dangerously close to the German border.

By November all turrets had been delivered by Landsverk. However, they had not yet been fitted with any armament because the Ordnance Department had decided to produce the needed 37 mm cannon itself in its arsenal, under a licence obtained from Bofors in June 1937 to equip the earlier M38, and manufacture had met with some serious delays. When the first car was officially delivered by DAF on 27 November 1939, not only did the turret lack any guns but also the hull machine guns and all visors were absent. Nine vehicles, also in an unfinished state, were delivered in December and the final two on 3 and 5 January 1940 respectively. DAF reduced the price by 1500 guilders per unit to partly compensate for the deficiencies. The cars were moved to an Ordnance Department facility in Delft to be completed. In late January the first vehicle could be fitted with the first 37 mm gun produced for the series and at the same time equipped with a full set of episcopes and periscopes provided by the Nederlandsche Instrumenten Compagnie (Nedisco); it was immediately tested at the gunnery range at Oldebroek. In February, five other vehicles were parked at the Cavalry Depot, officially "fit for military use" but in fact still waiting to be equipped with guns.

The delays irritated the ministry of defence such that in February it asked the Ordnance Department when the type could be operational. It was promised that six vehicles would be completed in March and April each if 110 bulletproof tyres of the Veil-Picard type, which had been ordered in December from Michelin in France after export of the American Seiberling-type had been forbidden, were delivered on the due date of 1 April. In fact the tyres would never arrive; and bar a single vehicle to which bulletproof tyres had been experimentally fitted all M39s used normal inflatable truck tyres. But a far more serious deficiency would impede operational use.

Already in May 1938, after cracks had been discovered in the conventional armour of the M36 vehicles, the ministry of defence had asked DAF whether their type, using untried welding techniques, could also be prone to cracking; in the summer of 1938 the commander of the 1e Eskadron Pantserwagens while testing the demonstrator vehicle had also expressed his concerns on this matter. Despite the warnings by Addink, Van Doorne pretended that he was unconcerned. Nevertheless the May 1939 contract had contained a warranty clause, instructing DAF to weld all connections tension-free and making DAF liable for all defects of this nature. Late March 1940 during cleaning it was discovered that on three of the six vehicles the welds of the machine gun mounts were cracking. One vehicle was sent to DAF that rewelded the crack and reinforced the glacis by riveting a steel plate behind it. Soon however, it transpired that next to the reinforcing plate a new crack had appeared. In April the number of cars showing cracks had risen to five and on some of these the welds between the glacis and bottom plates were starting to crack also. According to DAF the defects had been caused by attaching the mounts after the vehicles had been largely finished. The Comissie Pantserautomobielen concluded that, as war was imminent, DAF should be allowed to quickly repair the cracks by rewelding and fitting reinforcement plates but that ultimately the armour plates had to be completely replaced.

== The DAF M40 ==
Besides the twelve M39s needed in the four cavalry platoons, a platoon of three was needed for training purposes. Also a matériel reserve of ten vehicles was considered necessary. Postponing a decision about the formation of a possible full new Armoured Car Squadron, in January 1940 the ministry of defence ordered the Ordnance Department to start negotiations with DAF about the production of an additional three cars or, if a cheaper unit price could be agreed, of at once thirteen vehicles. In view of the delays with the previous production batch, armour and other components had already to be ordered. From February 1940 armour sets were ordered with Ougrée-Marhaye and Zeiss-periscopes with Nedisco. Landsverk was approached about the delivery of thirteen turrets. The Swedish company indicated that at a unit price of 9,800 guilders it could deliver four turrets late October 1940 followed by three turrets per month until January 1941. Fearing future Swedish export limitations, the Ordnance Department requested a production licence for the turrets. Landsverk refused to grant it to its rival DAF but agreed to a licence production by the Rotterdamsche Droogdok Maatschappij, that accordingly inspected an M39 in March 1940. However, DAF also made a turret design, a dummy of which was placed on the demonstrator vehicle.

The Ordnance Department estimated it could produce the thirteen 37 mm cannon for 92,000 guilders and the machine-guns for 37,500 guilders. When asked for a price quotation DAF indicated it would cost 47,750 guilders per unit to produce the first three car hulls and 42,640 guilders for the next ten vehicles; but when thirteen were ordered at once the unit price would drop to 41,275 guilders. From this the Ordnance Department concluded thirteen cars could be ready by 1 March 1941 for a unit price of 69,500 guilders. The Commissie Pantserautomobielen preferred a turret production by RDM that indicated it could deliver four turrets by 21 January 1941, four by 21 February and the final five by 21 March.

In the documentation of the period it had become common to refer to the new batch as a distinct type: the DAF Pantserwagen Model 40, probably because it was seen as an improved version using the planned 6x6 drive.

Because of the German invasion no production of the DAF M40 would ever materialise; a proposal by DAF to produce light tanks had already been rejected by the minister of defence in March 1940, despite being favoured by the Army Chief of Staff. The total production of the DAF M39/M40 series would thus be limited to twelve vehicles of the main production series and a prototype; nevertheless these thirteen vehicles present the main bulk of the Dutch prewar AFV-production.

== Description ==
In designing the DAF M39, Van Doorne deliberately strived for modernity. A traditional construction based on some pre-existing truck chassis was unacceptable for that reason alone. A brandnew design however, also had the advantage of being able to apply the most weight-efficient configuration. Partly this was achieved by a welded monocoque design that needed no heavy chassis girders, but also by the use of sloped armour, that could approach the ideal envelopment of a given inner space. This was most apparent with the Pantrado 2 design that used many facets to approximate the desired curvature. This would have worked even better through the use of cast armour, but casting would have been too expensive. In fact that was even true for the complex form of the Pantrado 2; the Pantrado 3 therefore showed a simplified hull shape, reducing the number of welds; a comparison has been made with the T-34 design. In cross-section the hull was essentially a hexagon and the intersection formed by the truncating glacis, or sloped frontal plate, was therefore hexagonal too. This was somewhat obscured by the fact that this glacis gradually merged with the front fenders. The front glacis connected to the bottom plate via a narrow strongly curved section. The back plate too was hexagonal but more reclined; it was at its underside joined to a lower back glacis plate, both forming a wedge. The upper and lower side plates also formed wedges.

Internally there was a single large inner space, lacking bulkheads separating the driver positions at both ends from the fighting room in the middle. This not being cluttered with girders, the most efficient position for the mechanical parts could be chosen, further decreasing weight and height. In the front the driver was seated on the left with the machine-gunner at his right. As there was a dual drive capacity, a second driver in the rear could immediately reverse the vehicle in an emergency situation without making a turn; he also could operate the rear machine-gun. To his left was the engine, enclosed by asbestos-reinforced bulkheads that formed a small engine compartment; these could be quickly removed to allow for repairs without leaving the vehicle. The engine could be accessed from the outside through a small subrectangular hatch in the roof or a large double hatch on the back that also provided ventilation, the slits being protected by conspicuous raised longitudinal covers. As the vehicle was largely symmetrical, it was not always easy to tell the front from the back, especially if the turret was reversed. This Landsverk turret was slightly less modern in appearance, in the form of a truncated cone; the turret originally designed for the Pantrado 2 had been lower and sleeker. In it were the commander and gunner, bringing the total number of crew members to five.

The DAF M39 was a rather compact vehicle, 4.75 metres long, 2.22 metres wide and 2.16 metres high. The width of the armoured hull as such, without fenders, was 2.08 metres and its height without turret 1.60 metres. Track width was 1.73 metres for the front wheels and 1.81 metres for the rear wheels. The general ground clearance was forty centimetres but just 31 cm at the rear axle. It could wade though sixty cm of water. The car had two doors, one at each side. In addition each driver had a circular hatch in the roof of the hull and the turret had a circular hatch in the roof and two large side hatches. A side hatch was also available to the back driver. Ventilation for the main compartment was provided by an armoured ventilation grid on the right side, that however only sucked in air when a hatch in the engine bulkhead was opened. All doors and hatches were made gas-tight by the use of rubber rebates.

The armour was light, just enough to defeat light machine gun fire. The front side and back plates had a thickness of 10 mm (0.39 in). Due to differences in angling the effective protection varied though: the back, sloped at about 30°, was the best protected area with a line-of-sight thickness of about 20 mm, to which a certain deflection effect should be added. The 45° front glacis had an effective thickness of about 14 mm; the sloping effect of the side plates was negligible. The top had a thickness of six, the bottom of five millimetres. Several conventional designs, the M36 and M38 included, did not even have bottom armour. The fenders too were made of armour steel, four millimetres thick. The Swedish turret had a lower armour basis: its walls were 7.5 mm thick, its roof five. The small size and light armour resulted in a relatively light vehicle with a loaded weight of somewhat over six tonnes. The pressure was evenly divided over the wheels, the rear axle bearing four and the front axle two tonnes. Additional protection was provided by two portable fire extinguishers, one of the dry powder type, the other using carbon tetrachloride.

The main armament was in the turret, consisting of the semi-automatic Bofors 37 mm Long 34 cannon, that the Dutch called the 4 paw. Though the DAF M39 was primarily intended as a reconnaissance vehicle, the Dutch Army was painfully aware it lacked any heavier armour to back it up, so an armament had been chosen with an adequate antitank-capacity for the period. The Bofors 37 mm L/34 could defeat almost all German armour in use on 10 May 1940 and the M36, 38 and 39's carried the largest calibre of all armoured cars on that date operational on the Western Front. For the gun an APHE and a HE round were available. The specifications of 1937 detailed that the ammunition stock should be no less than a hundred. The gun had an elevation of 23° and a depression of 9°30°°. Optionally coaxial was a Lewis 7.92 mm machine-gun to the left of the cannon that could be decoupled and then was movable within a cone of 30°. It was specially modified, increasing the original 6.5 mm calibre, and called the M. 20 no. 2. Elevation of the main gun and traverse of the turret were by hand. The commander, sitting on the right, had to load the main gun; the gunner to his left loaded the machine-gun. The commander had a periscope having a magnification of 2.5 and a field of view of 28°. The gunner had a (non-rotatable) episcope, also serving as gunsight, with a magnification of 1.75 and a field of view of 40°.

The remainder of the armament consisted of the two hull machine guns, one in the front plate, the other in the back plate. They were placed in ball-mounts attached to protruding sections welded to the plates. They too were movable within a cone of 30°. They were of a slightly different modified 7.92 mm Lewis type called the M. 20 no. 1. The rear machine-gun could be removed and placed in a special mount on the turret roof to function as an anti-aircraft weapon. All three machine guns mounts were extended with a special long armour sleeve to protect the cooling aluminium barrel-casing, typical of the Lewis gun. The specifications asked for a stock of 4,000 rounds of machine gun ammunition; also pistols and twenty hand-grenades should be present.

For external communications it was intended to equip all vehicles with a radio set. For this it would have been necessary to rebuild the turrets, attaching a bustle at their back, to place the sets in. No vehicle had yet been so modified in May 1940. The commander could also give light signals to vehicles behind him by means of a small signal lamp placed on a small pedestal at the back of the turret. For internal communications he could use an electrical-optical installation, allowing him to give orders to the drivers by pushing one of four buttons: "Drive Forward", "Forward Halt", "Drive Backward" and "Backward Halt", causing the corresponding orders to light up on the respective driver consoles. The driver could more mundanely communicate with the outside world using a vehicle horn.

The engine, a liquid-cooled Ford Mercury V8 3.9 litres 95 hp, made a maximum speed of about 75 km/h possible. There were three forward gears and one reverse. An auxiliary gearbox, placed behind the engine, functioned as reversing device and allowed for the dual drive capacity: the rear driver could use the same gears as the main driver. However, the maximum speed in the reverse direction was, for safety reasons and because the back drive system had been deliberately made less robust to save weight, indicated by the manufacturer as 50 km/h. In both cases steering was via the front wheels, with a minimum turning radius of 11.15 m (36.6 ft). Both drivers had a full set of standard steering controls, even with separate odometers. Each driver had a rectangular hatch in front of him, that could hinge upwards to provide an unimpeded view of the road; due to the short nose there were no dead angles in his field of vision. When closed the outside could still be seen via a vision slit, protected by armoured glass and fully closable through a small sliding armour plate. The environment could then be better observed by means of five prismatic blocks placed below the raised circular top hatch. The blocks could be quickly replaced when damaged. The front of the main compartment also had small side hatches, likewise fitted with vision slits; the back driver had such a small hatch available within the larger hatch at his right. In darkness vision could be improved by two large headlamps on both the front and the back of the vehicle.

The front wheel used helical springs and hydraulic dampers; the rear axle leaf springs. It was connected on both sides to the Trado-system by which all four rear wheels could be driven. Hydraulic brakes were present on all six wheels. It had been intended to fit bulletproof tyres, but as none were available conventional Dunlop Trackgrip terrain tyres were used. Bulletproof tyres would have slightly reduced the maximum speed. Special armoured hubcaps protected the hubs. As the sloped armour caused a considerable overhang at the nose of the vehicle it was equipped at this point with two rather large unpowered auxiliary wheels, to prevent ditching. If ditched or stuck in soft soil, freeing the cars could be facilitated by two detachable boards, attached on each side above the rear wheels, which position also reduced dust clouds while driving and covered what otherwise would have been a very conspicuous light-dark contrast between the angled upper hull and the large shadowed part below the rear fender. There were two fuel reservoirs, a main and a reserve tank, below the floor plate of the main compartment, holding a total of 85 litres of petrol; this allowed for a range of about 200-225 kilometres. The numbers given by some sources of a hundred litres and a range of three hundred kilometres, are incorrect.

DAF sprayed a red lead primer on the cars and then finished them with a semi-gloss coating in the standard colour of the Dutch Army: "army green", that was at the time conceived as a rather dark and dull bronze. The orange triangle Dutch national insignia were absent on the M 39s. Instead during the fighting as a makeshift solution on occasion the Dutch flag was used, sometimes as such, in at least one case painted as a large red-white-blue tricolour on the back of the vehicle. Black military vehicle registration numbers, from III-2201 to III-2212, were applied on a rectangular orange background. No large white identification numbers were used, as did the other Dutch armoured car types. As was usual for Dutch army matériel during most of the twentieth century, no camouflage pattern was applied. The inside was sprayed with an aluminium colour, with the exception of the inside of doors and hatches.

== Operational history ==
=== Dutch service ===
==== Training ====
Footage from the M-39, with the 37mm gun mounted, spring 1940

Early 1939 it had been planned that the four Hussar Regiments, the intended destination of the DAF M39s, would each provide for the training of their respective armoured car platoons. On 1 January 1940 the 4e Regiment Huzaren based at Deventer would be allotted the necessary professional personnel, followed by 1e Regiment Huzaren at Amersfoort on 1 April, 2e Regiment Huzaren at Breda on 1 July 1940 and 3e Regiment Huzaren at The Hague on 1 October. Once the professionals had acquainted themselves with the matériel, a training course would be devised, based on their experiences, for the conscripts, lasting fifteen months. The first DAF M39 platoon would then be active late 1941 or early 1942.

In the summer of 1939, the Inspector of Cavalry and Bicycle Forces rejected this plan because the hussar regiments lacked the technical support to ensure a successful introduction of the new and advanced type. He proposed to form a special 3e Eskadron Pantserwagens ("3rd Armoured Car Squadron") based at Apeldoorn. It could give a centralised training course but also, an important consideration given the growing international tensions, be used as an emergency third squadron in time of war. While this, rather expensive, proposal was pondered upon by his superiors and the ministry of defence, the Second World War broke out on 1 September; the Dutch Army had mobilised somewhat earlier. The change to a wartime organisation would cause the plan to be abandoned; but it has led to the misunderstanding that the DAF M39s in 1940 were united in this hypothetical 3rd Armoured Car Squadron.

In September training within the Cavalry Arm was assigned to the newly formed Cavalry Depot, that after a short mobilisation phase at Amersfoort was moved to The Hague as had been prearranged in the Case Blue concentration plan. Conscripts should now be quickly trained to form active units. In November the first professional personnel arrived, officers and NCOs, destined for the four DAF M39 platoons. DAF had been asked to provide a two-month training course for about thirty men at the factory itself, but the company vehemently objected. The Ordnance Department concurred: the training should take place at its facility at Delft, the same location the cars were to be completed with armament. For this purpose it prepared a special DAF M39 manual, creating a first draught, the Ontwerp Beschrijving van de Pantserwagen M. 39, the final version of which however, would not be ready in time to be published. In January 1940 140 conscripts arrived to be trained in the use of the M36 and M38. As the units employing these types were already at strength, these men were diverted to the, much shortened, M39 training, to eventually raise four platoons, hoped to be ready on 1 July 1940.

The armoured cars themselves only began to arrive late February. This delay was used to give a first general driver training to the crew-members, the vast majority of whom did not possess a driver licence, as prewar car ownership had been relatively low in The Netherlands. At first even for this no vehicles were available and an attempt to give basic infantry training instead, failed for lack of rifles. After a few weeks old Dutch Eysink motorcycles could be used — each platoon also would have a motorcycle squad — and then some modern German BMW motorcycles. Also the old Bison and Buffel armoured cars were used, that in 1932 had been built by the Ordnance Department on the chassis of Morris trucks to assist the security forces in suppressing riots during the Great Depression. The first five DAF M39s received were incomplete lacking armament; they were only used for theoretical instruction before being taken away to be equipped with their cannon. In March they became available again, of one vehicle in the meantime the armour cracks had been repaired by DAF. However, they still lacked machine-guns, gunsights, ammunition stowage and many smaller other fittings and therefore were only usable for driver training; gunnery training was postponed. Most of the training took place at or near The Hague. In April the commander of the Cavalry Depot concluded that under these conditions at best a single platoon could be ready on 1 July and all four no earlier than 1 September.

During April the remaining armoured cars were delivered, again incomplete. Of the first cars, four that month had to be sent back to DAF to repair cracks.

Meanwhile, for the four Hussar Regiments some makeshift solution had to be found, to provide them with armoured cars. For the 2nd and 3rd Hussar Regiment the arrangement turned out to be quite minimal: one section was allocated to each but that of the first only contained the Buffel and Bison, the obsolete vehicles that were in fact used for training the M39 crews, and that of the other regiment consisted of two Carden Loyd Mark VI tankettes that in reality had been removed from the field army altogether and were guarding the Waalhaven airfield. Thus only a nominal strength was present on paper. However, the 2nd Armoured Car Squadron was split up to provide two platoons to each of the two remaining regiments, 1st and 4th Hussars.

==== Battle of the Netherlands ====
When the Battle of the Netherlands started on 10 May 1940, of the twelve vehicles manufactured, four were in Eindhoven with DAF, eight at Delft; of the last, two were still lacking their main armament and none were fully completed, though some had been equipped with machine-guns. No crews were fully trained. The base at Delft, in between the Dutch seat of government The Hague and the port of Rotterdam, had been seen as a safe rear-area location at the very heart of the Dutch National Redoubt, the Fortress Holland. On the early morning of 10 May however, these two major cities were assaulted by German parachutists and airborne troops attempting to capture the Dutch government. The attack did not come as a total surprise; as it had been feared that a German invasion was imminent, Supreme Command had ordered several security measures on 8 May, among which the formation of a small cavalry security force from Delft depot units, the Depotdetachement Bewakingstroepen Cavalerie, to guard The Hague, to which a DAF M39 platoon was added. In the night of 9–10 May, these three M39s were parked at a base in The Hague. As another base in the city had already been bombed, the cars were on 10 May initially ordered to seek cover from aerial observation in the Haagse Bos, a park.

The German attempt to seize The Hague failed, partly because Landsverk armoured cars destroyed many Ju 52 transport planes and thereby blocked the runway of the main city airfield, Ypenburg. As a result the next waves of planes landed on meadows and roads, dispersing the airborne troops into many small groups which, unable to be reinforced, in the following days tried to break out towards Rotterdam, the southern part of which city was firmly in German hands. In the confused situation the platoon in the afternoon of 10 May was ordered to convoy a munition truck to Delft. At a Dutch roadblock the commander of one car was killed, both sides mistaking each other for Germans. Finally arriving in Delft, two of the armoured cars were in the late afternoon ordered to support an advance of some depot companies to the south, in the direction of Rotterdam, that soon was blocked by enemy fire. Lacking bulletproof tyres, the cars were held back, only supporting the troops by shelling enemy positions at a distance. Though this was forbidden, one of the cars fired shells in a nine o'clock or three o'clock position of the turret; the lateral recoil forces distorted the front wheel suspension so severely that the car could no longer be steered. Repair proving impossible, the vehicle was, somewhat prematurely, on 11 May destroyed by its own crew to prevent it from falling into enemy hands. Later that evening the second car also showed a defect, probably a main armament malfunction, causing it to be withdrawn the next day to the base. In the same evening of 10 May the third car, III-2203, that experimentally had been fitted with bulletproof Michelin tyres, positioned itself on the southern edge of Delft, without making enemy contact, but in vain trying to shoot down a low-flying German aircraft with the main gun.

On 11 May III-2203 was ordered to support an advance over the Delft-Rotterdam highway. At first this met little enemy resistance, the main problem being that the car was fired upon by a fighter aircraft, that the vehicle commander recognised as a Dutch Fokker G.1. Then several Junkers Ju 52s were encountered, that had landed on the road and were now used by the German airborne troops as cover in the open polder landscape. Of one undamaged plane the DAF M39 shot off the engine; another, stuck in a ditch, was put on fire by some 37 mm HE-shells, fired at distance. The fire generated an enormous black smoke cloud, forcing the armoured car to break off the attack. The armour of the car during the action easily deflected enemy machine-gun rounds. By noon most of the Dutch infantry was withdrawn to rest and eat; during the afternoon the armoured car again made a probing attack against the cluster of Ju 52s. The commander decided to hold his fire and approached within forty metres of the enemy position, to provoke a reaction. Suddenly the vehicle was hit from all sides by a hail of bullets, some of these penetrated the thinner turret armour. Now responding with its main gun and hull machine-gun the M39 forced the Germans to take cover, but the gunner suddenly reported: "I am wounded" and sagged bleeding to the floor of the fighting compartment. The car drove back to the Dutch positions to seek medical assistance for the gunner, who was hospitalised. At a civil garage in Delft some brake malfunction was repaired. Most ammunition had been expended.

On 12 May the commander of III-2203 discovered that all trained crews had been moved to The Hague. Most of that day and the morning of 13 May were used to find a truck and fetch a replacement gunner and new munition from The Hague. In the afternoon the vehicle protected the headquarters of the 1st Infantry Division at Rijswijk. On 14 May the car supported an attempt to eliminate the largest remaining pocket of German airborne troops, that had gathered around Major-General Hans Graf von Sponeck at Overschie, together with a Landsverk M38 armoured car from 2e Eskadron Pantserwagens. During the advance the clutch of III-2203 malfunctioned and the car returned to Delft for repairs. Rejoining the fight in the afternoon, III-2003 first took a civilian, fled from the village, on board to point out the exact German positions. Shortly afterwards the attacking Dutch troops witnessed the devastating bombardment of Rotterdam, just south of Overschie. Continuing to advance nevertheless, the two armoured cars were suddenly hit by antitank rifle fire and returned to the Dutch lines. It transpired that the M39 had been penetrated twice low in the side hull armour, without the projectiles doing any damage or even being noticed; a third round had been stopped by the thin strip of reinforcing steel around the turret base that doubled the normal armour thickness. Rotterdam capitulating as a result of the carpet bombing, III-2203 was withdrawn to The Hague.

In The Hague also the five DAF M39s were present, two of them without main armament, that had not been used in the Depotdetachement Bewakingstroepen Cavalerie. In the morning of 10 May these vehicles had been readied and then moved to the headquarters of the Commander Fortress Holland. In the subsequent days they had remained in the city, sometimes patrolling the streets or responding to the many false alarms about presumed Fifth Column activities. In one incident, on 11 May, an M39 had set fire to some railway wagons where, probably groundlessly, German paratroopers were suspected to have hidden.

Fearing a further destruction of the Dutch cities, the Dutch supreme commander Henri Winkelman at 16:50 ordered his troops to destroy their equipment and then surrender themselves to the Germans. In the evening of 14 May it was accordingly attempted to disable some DAF M39s by driving them into the sea at Scheveningen. Two vehicles indeed reached the waves, a third got stuck on the boulevard stairway to the beach.

Besides the eight cars at Delft, on 10 May four M39s were present in the DAF factory at Eindhoven. In the morning Wim van Doorne, the brother of Hub, phoned the military authorities in The Hague to remind them of this fact, because the German invaders might soon overrun the area. He was advised to contact the military commander of the forces in North Brabant province. The latter asked DAF to drive the cars to Vught, where they were transferred to the 4e Compagnie Korps Motordienst, a motorisation unit of his main force, the Peeldivisie, that would remain in the province. As a result the vehicles were not evacuated to the Fortress Holland. A persistent story that the M39s had tried to reach the North but were blocked by the German paratroopers having captured the bridges at Moerdijk is thus likely apocryphal. Probably the armoured cars accompanied the Peeldivisie staff to Princenhage near Breda in the night of 10–11 May. Lacking full crews or munition they were apparently later abandoned in the west of the province when the remnants of the division withdrew to Zealand on 13 and 14 May.

=== German service ===
As they were minimally equipped with AFVs, at best an armoured car platoon of three, regular German infantry divisions of this period were very keen on incorporating Beutepanzer or captured enemy armour. In this case also, the division for the moment occupying the province of South Holland, 227. Infanterie-Division, was not slow to exploit the occasion: already on 15 May it obtained permission to add four M39s, together with some Landsverk vehicles, to its strength. They were used by its Aufklärungs-Abteilung or reconnaissance battalion. It is uncertain what was the exact provenance of these four vehicles. One M39 had been destroyed by its own crew and photographs shows that the one stuck at the Scheveningen boulevard was cannibalised by the Germans. The two other cars at Scheveningen were pulled from the shallow sea and repaired. Photographic evidence shows both M39s with and without guns in use by other German units. The four vehicles abandoned in the west of North Brabant were on 16 May in the hands of 33. IR, an infantry regiment of 225. ID, that had assembled them at a base in Roosendaal; their exact further fate is unknown, though they were doubtlessly pressed into service. Later an official German designation was given: Panzerspähwagen DAF 201 (h) ("reconnaissance armoured car DAF 201 (h)"), in which the "h" stands for holländisch, "Hollandic".

Late May, 227. ID went to France; pictures taken there show four M39s, repainted in a gray colour and with extra large Balkenkreuze, the German national cross insignia, on hull and turret. All are fitted with 37 mm guns. Until the middle of 1941 the division was tasked with various occupation duties in France; then it was stationed in Belgium. That summer four M39s in use by the division were sent to DAF for a complete overhaul. On this occasion the steering mechanism was reinforced and radio sets were fitted, using very high and large antennae of the "bed frame" type, attached to the turret roof. The four cars of the reconnaissance unit of 227. ID took from November 1941 part in Operation Barbarossa, in the relatively quiet northern front sector, and were all lost on the Eastern front during the next years, apparently lasting well into 1943, perhaps because they were used for rear-area security duty. One seems to have been destroyed by a Soviet tank, others to have been abandoned for lack of spare parts and destroyed by their own crews. Several sources claim that M39s were used by the German military police, the Ordnungspolizei, but this seems to be based on a confusion with the use by that organisation of Dutch Landsverk M36s.

In August 1940 from the Delft depot the broken down M 39 left there on 11 May was sent, together with a Landsverk M38, to the Heeresversuchstelle Kummersdorf at Kummersdorf to be researched and was then stocked at Stettin-Altdamm to be part of a planned large German armour museum in Stettin. In March 1945, on approach of the Red Army, the armour collection was used to assist the defenders of Stettin and lost in that process.

== Plans for postwar production ==
After the war, the Dutch army had to be rebuilt and modernised, with a far higher level of motorisation. Also equipment had to be found for the expeditionary army fighting the colonial war in the Dutch East Indies, the Indonesian War of Independence. For the reconnaissance units armoured cars were taken from the various Allied army dumps present on Dutch territory, of the British Humber Mk IV, American Staghound and Canadian Otter Light Reconnaissance Car types. Though these had been obtained for scrap value in the spring of 1946, their condition was so poor that the maintenance effort needed to keep the rusty equipment operational proved to be prohibitively expensive. To solve this problem, Humber Mk IVs had to be bought from the UK. The General Staff therefore already in June 1946 considered the question whether it then would not be cheaper to restart production of the DAF M39. For the moment it was however decided to procure the American M8 Greyhound, use the Canadian Lynx version of the Daimler Armoured Car present on the dumps and to combine the turrets of old Humber cars with the more mechanically reliable Canadian Fox Armoured Car hulls, that also could be obtained from army dumps, resulting in the so-called "Humfox" hybrid vehicle.

In July 1946 the General Staff predicted that the vehicles in the future returning from the Indies would be completely worn out and concluded it would be preferable to replace the six types of armoured car in use as much as was possible with a single home-built type, especially in view of the Dutch balance of payment. DAF showed itself prepared to produce the DAF M39. In fact some material for new cars, purchased for the DAF M40 batch, was still present, among it armour sets for ten vehicles delivered by Ourgrée Malgray in July 1941. The Germans at that time supervised the fulfilment of existing Dutch defence contracts by the Ordnance Department ensuring they could benefit from them; it is uncertain whether they allowed the delivery to take place because the material could be used to repair existing M39s or because they initially intended to start production of the type in Eindhoven. In 1941 the Dutch industrial capacity was increasingly employed to assist the German war effort; in 1942 this would again change when growing losses on the Eastern Front induced the Nazi government to force all available Dutch manpower to work in Germany itself and the materials would remain unused at the DAF-factory. They could now be combined with parts taken from army dumps; the Dutch Army still considered the DAF M39 to be more modern in general than existing Allied types but it would nevertheless be necessary to upgrade the type with a new engine and a new turret equipped with a six-pounder (57 mm) gun to be able to defeat the Soviet T-34-85 at a short range.

In September 1946 the Chief General Staff asked the Chief Technical Staff to further investigate the feasibility of Dutch armoured car production. In October the General Staff reported to the ministry of war that over the years 1947 to 1948 the Army needed to add about two hundred armoured cars to its strength whereas most of the 125 armoured cars remaining in dumps were generally only useful for cannibalisation. Meanwhile DAF had indicated to be able to produce the required number at a rate of ten vehicles per month, manufacture starting one year after the order had been received. In December the minister of defence answered that in principle he could agree with a production by DAF but that the costs of the project had first to be established and that also Belgium had to be contacted to inquire whether that nation would be interested in a cooperative production of the type. Accordingly in January 1947 a special commission was formed, the Commissie Bestudering Van Doorne-Pantserwagens, to study the cost aspects. This commission soon began to consider the option to procure light tanks instead of armoured cars. In February Wim van Doorne personally approached the minister of war to emphasise the willingness of DAF to produce the DAF M39 or, if necessary, to develop light or medium tanks. In May the commission concluded that there indeed was a need for two hundred new armoured cars, namely 154 vehicles to equip six squadrons and two reconnaissance regiments in the Dutch Indies together with 46 vehicles for training purposes. At the same time a list of specifications was established, most of them conforming in detail with the known qualities of the 6x6 DAF M40, including the 37 mm gun, though instead of the Bofors some British or American cannon already in use had to be fitted. Lieutenant-Colonel Piet van der Trappen and Major P. Scheper would make a study trip to the Indies to investigate the local conditions to prepare a tropicalised version. DAF calculated the total costs to produce two hundred units at 27.6 million guilders.

A production order was postponed however, because the operational command of the expeditionary army could not immediately indicate whether it wanted to continue the employment of armoured cars. Eventually it was decided to replace them all by light tanks or jeeps. Therefore, a procurement of the DAF type was no longer necessary, as the home army also would for the reconnaissance rôle be equipped with a light tank, the M24 Chaffee, leased for free by the USA. In 1949 the Belgian general staff still showed some interest in the type, requiring from its Dutch counterpart information on the operational history. As this could not be provided, in September 1949 the Section Military History was tasked to write a report that was finished in December. It concluded that little useful battlefield experience had been obtained by the Dutch Army itself — information on the German use was unavailable — but that the type seemed to have been superior to the Landsverk vehicles. Attention was drawn to the plate cracking problem and it was recommended to install a 6x6 drive in case of production. The report was communicated to the Belgian command, without further result.

Apparently, no vehicles used by the Germans survived the war; an inquiry in the late nineties by the Dutch authorities with the Russian Kubinka Tank Museum, whether it had any knowledge of still existing exemplars, proved fruitless. However in 1940, still one vehicle was present at the Delft base of the Ordnance Department. Its directorate that year successfully requested the German Industrie-Beauftragte des Oberkommandos der Wehrmacht to be allowed to add this car to the collection of a planned heavy equipment display of the Dutch Army Museum. It was stored at the Pesthuis at Leyden, but there are no records regarding its ultimate fate. According to armour historian Fred Vos, this was the vehicle disabled on 11 May. Later historian John Bom doubted this identification however, because he considered it unlikely the Germans would abandon a battle-worthy vehicle, assuming instead it was the original DAF prototype, which could not be operationally used as it was made of boiler plate. In any case photographic evidence shows that the prototype was still present at the grounds of the DAF factory in the late forties. It had probably been scrapped by the early fifties.
