= Trado =

Dutch transport vehicle

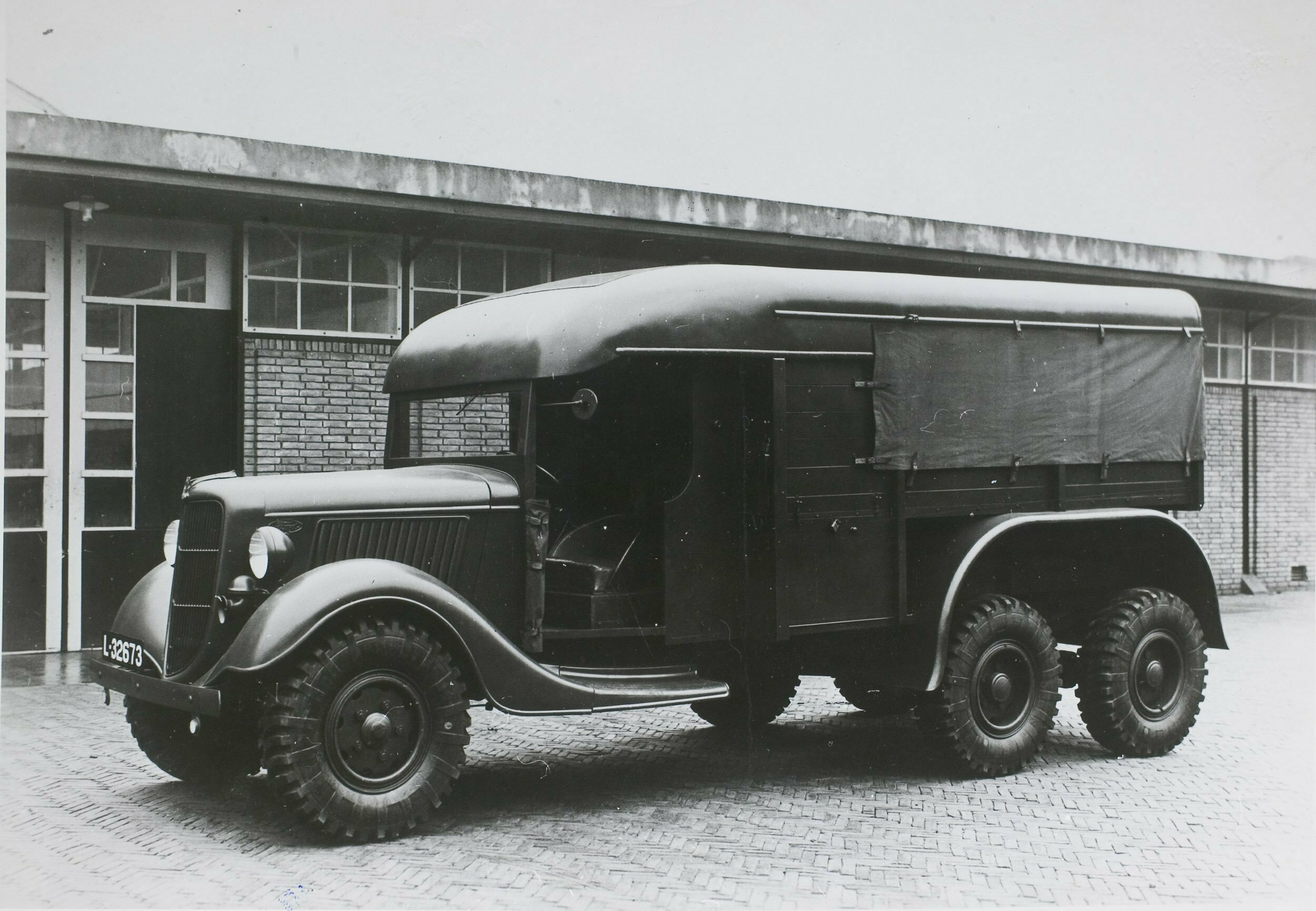
- Trado Ford V8 modified as an artillery tractor
- Place of origin: Netherlands

Service history
- Used by: Netherlands
- Wars: Second World War

Production history
- Designed: 1935
- Manufacturer: DAF

Specifications
- Engine: Ford V-8 (Trado I & II), Chevrolet 216 (Trado III)

The Trado was a truck manufactured by DAF in the Netherlands.

It was named after the co-founder of DAF Hubertus van Doorne and captain engineer Piet van der Trappen (Trappen — Doorne).

== Design ==
The Trado consisted of a leaf-springed bogie with two actuated road wheels that could be easily attached to, driven by and rotate on the back axle of any commercial truck, thus adding a "walking beam" to the vehicle that significantly improved its cross-country performance.

=== Trado III ===
The Trado III suspension system, an improved version, was a considerable commercial success and applied to many existing and new civilian and military truck types.

== Pantrado ==
The armoured vehicle projects had the designation Pantrado in common, a contraction of the Dutch word Pantserwagen (armoured car), and Trado.

The Trado III suspension could be fitted with a track on the lines of the Kégresse track, changing a vehicle into a half-track.

=== Pantrado 1 ===
The first project, the Pantrado 1, envisaged a very long type with a good trench-crossing capability, brought about by applying the principle of the articulated vehicle: it was to consist of two fully tracked truck hulls attached back to back, connected by a large horizontal articulated cylinder. The full track was to be achieved by extending the track over the rubber-tired front wheels. The cylinder could be split, creating two tanks, each with the engine in front and the fighting room, crowned by a gun turret, at the back.

=== Pantrado 2 ===
The second project, the Pantrado 2, was in the form of a single half-track.

=== Pantrado 3 ===
The third armoured project, called the M39 Pantserwagen, or Pantrado 3, dispensed with the track option entirely and was a pure armoured car. In view of the intended reconnaissance role of the vehicles to be procured, the Royal Netherlands Army was only interested in this third type.

In the autumn of 1937, the army ordered a single prototype to be built; Van Doorne and Van der Trappen had indicated this could be finished quickly as they had already prepared the manufacture of a demonstrator vehicle. The claim to superiority to British design was based on the use of a welded monocoque construction combined with a consistent use of the sloped armour principle, which was predicted to lead to a much improved weight-efficiency.

This type did thus not utilise an existing truck chassis, as was common for contemporary armoured cars.

== See also ==
- Scammell Pioneer, a 1927 British 6×4 artillery tractor, with a similar rear bogie arrangement.
- H-drive, a development of the Trado concept, for all wheel drive vehicles.
