= Leonardo's fighting vehicle =

Tank concept designed by Leonardo da Vinci

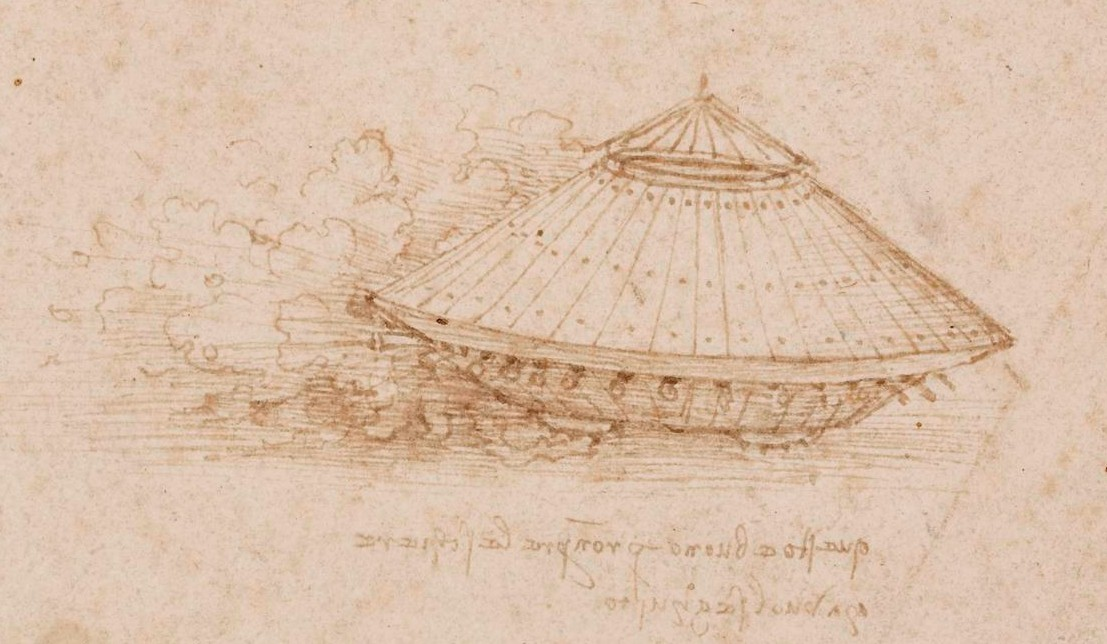
Sketch of the vehicle

Leonardo da Vinci's fighting vehicle, also known as Da Vinci's Tank, is one of the conceptions of the revered Italian polymath and artist Leonardo da Vinci.

== Design ==
From one of Leonardo da Vinci's letters, addressed to Ludovico Sforza, the Duke of Milan written around 1482, part of Leonardo's Codex Atlanticus:

I will make protected wagons, reliable and impregnable, which, piercing the enemy's ranks with the fire of their artillery, will destroy him, no matter how great the number of his soldiers. The infantry can follow the tanks without suffering great losses and without encountering any resistance.

=== Design in depth ===
The concept was designed while Leonardo da Vinci was under the patronage of Ludovico Sforza in 1487. Sometimes described as a prototype of modern tanks, Leonardo's armoured vehicle represented a conical cover inspired by a turtle's shell. The covering was to be made of wood and reinforced with metal plates. Slanting angles would deflect enemy fire, similar to sloped armour today. The machine would be powered by two large cranks operated internally by four strong men and equipped with an array of light cannons, placed around the perimeter.

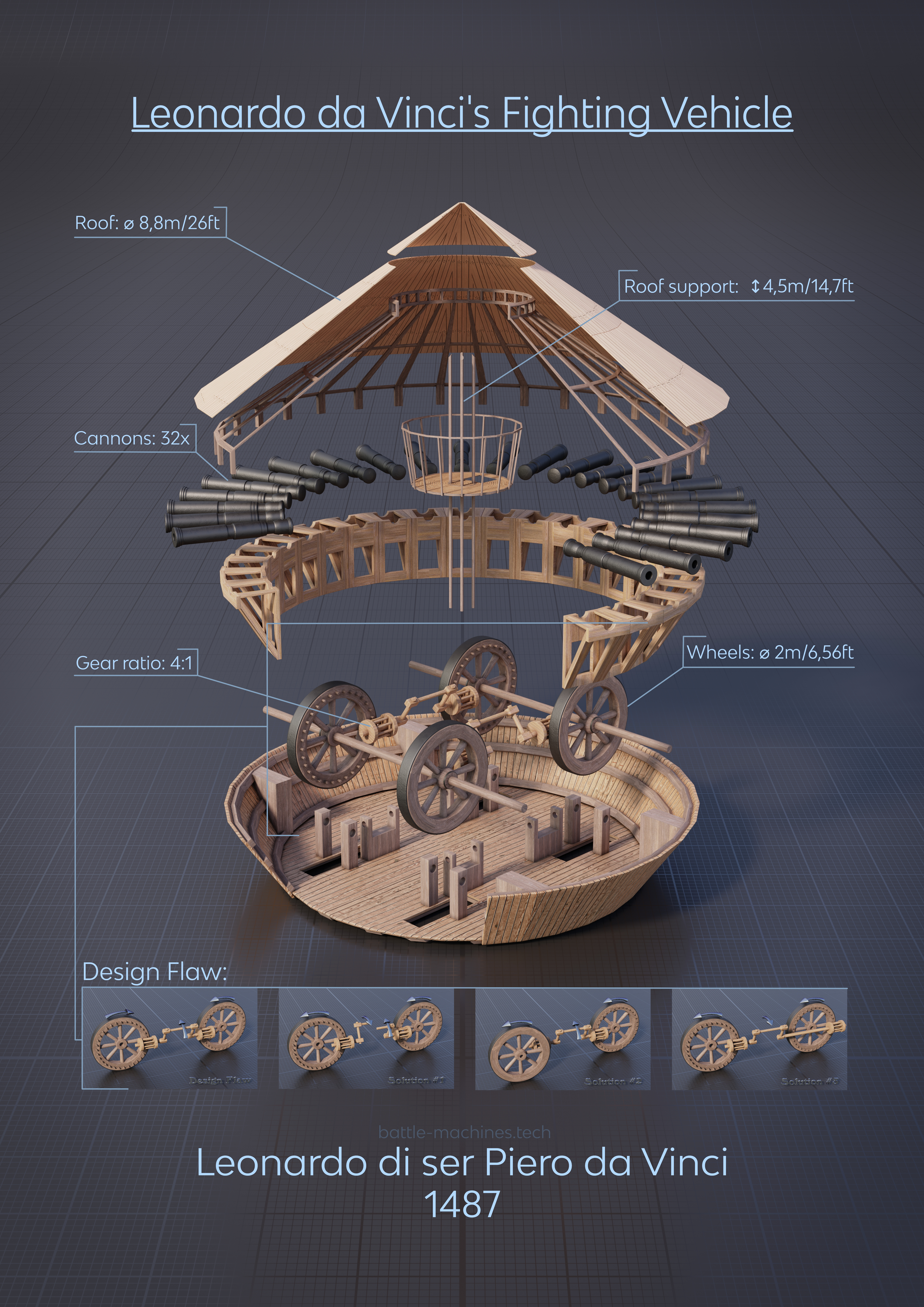
Design flaw and dimensions of the vehicle

The gears of the design were located in a reversed order, making the vehicle unworkable. This is thought by some sources to have been a deliberate mistake by Leonardo as a form of security, in case his design was stolen and used irresponsibly as seen in his other designs where he also used mirror writing, it is almost impossible to fix this problem successfully without taking away power from its forward movement and strength. However in the documentary "Da Vinci's Machines" (2009), a team of engineers and craftsmen undertook the challenge of reconstructing Leonardo's design for an armoured vehicle, commonly referred to as his tank. The successful operation and movement of the tank by fixing the design flaw with the gearing not only validated Leonardo's innovative thinking but also showcased the capabilities of contemporary engineering to reinterpret historical designs, although it would have lacked the battlefield mobility seen in modern tanks that make them so effective today.

Due to the vehicle's impressive size, it would not be capable of moving on rugged terrain. The project could hardly be applied and realized in the 15th century.

== See also ==
- List of works by Leonardo da Vinci
