= Talus (fortification) =

Sloped base portion of a fortified wall

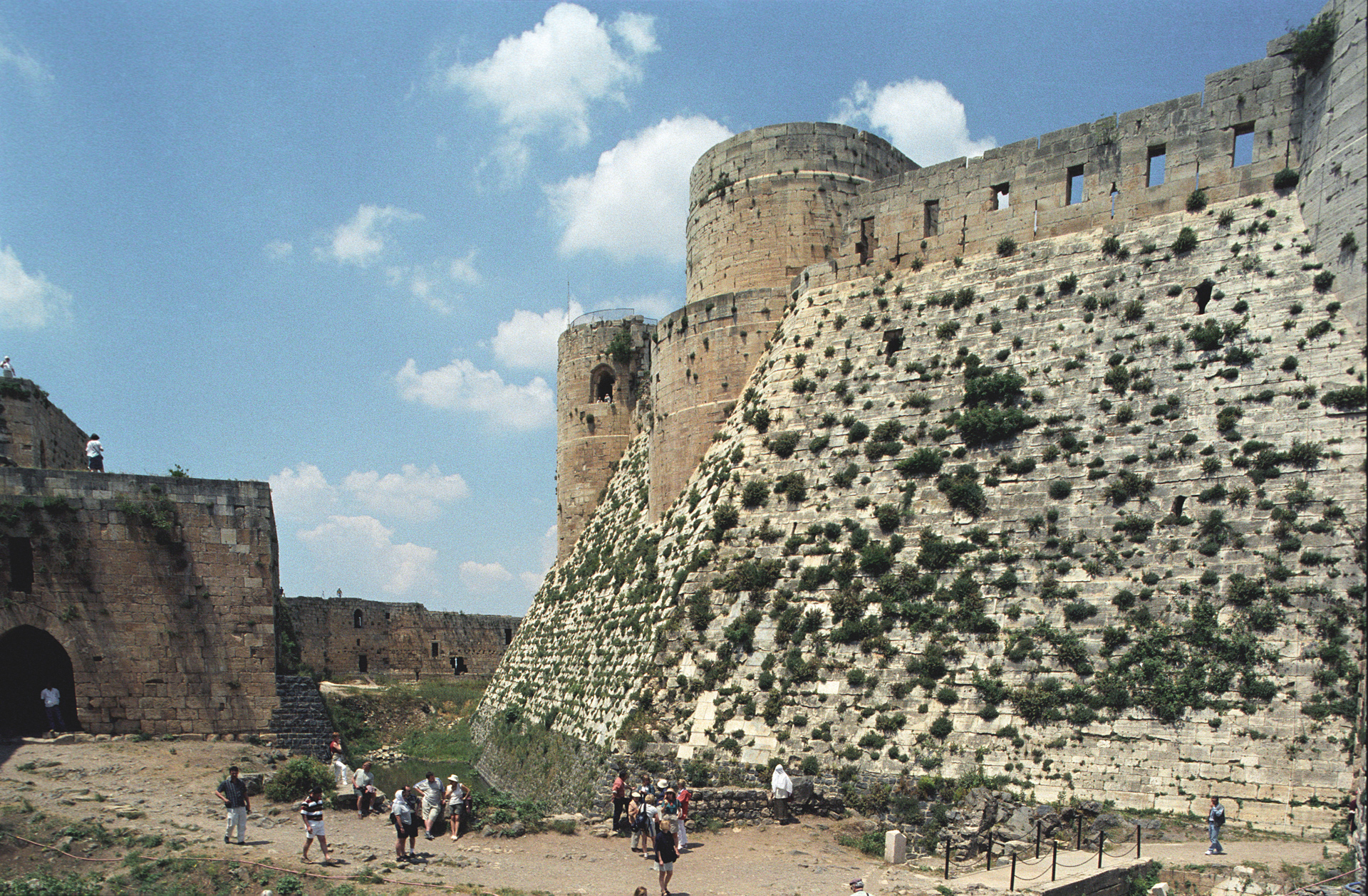
- The Krak des Chevaliers in Syria, with a tall and clearly defined talus

In architecture, a talus is an inwardly sloping fortified wall. Such battering is found on some late medieval castles, especially prevalent in Crusader constructions. The slope may be part or near full height.

== Function ==
The slope acts as an effective defensive measure in two ways. First, conventional siege equipment is less effective against a wall with a talus. Scaling ladders may be unable to reach the top of the walls and are also more easily broken due to the bending stresses caused by the angle they are forced to adopt. Siege towers cannot approach closer than the base of the talus, and their gangplank may be unable to cover the horizontal span of the talus, rendering them useless. Defenders are also able to drop rocks over the walls, which will shatter on the talus, spraying a hail of shrapnel into any attackers massed at the base of the wall.

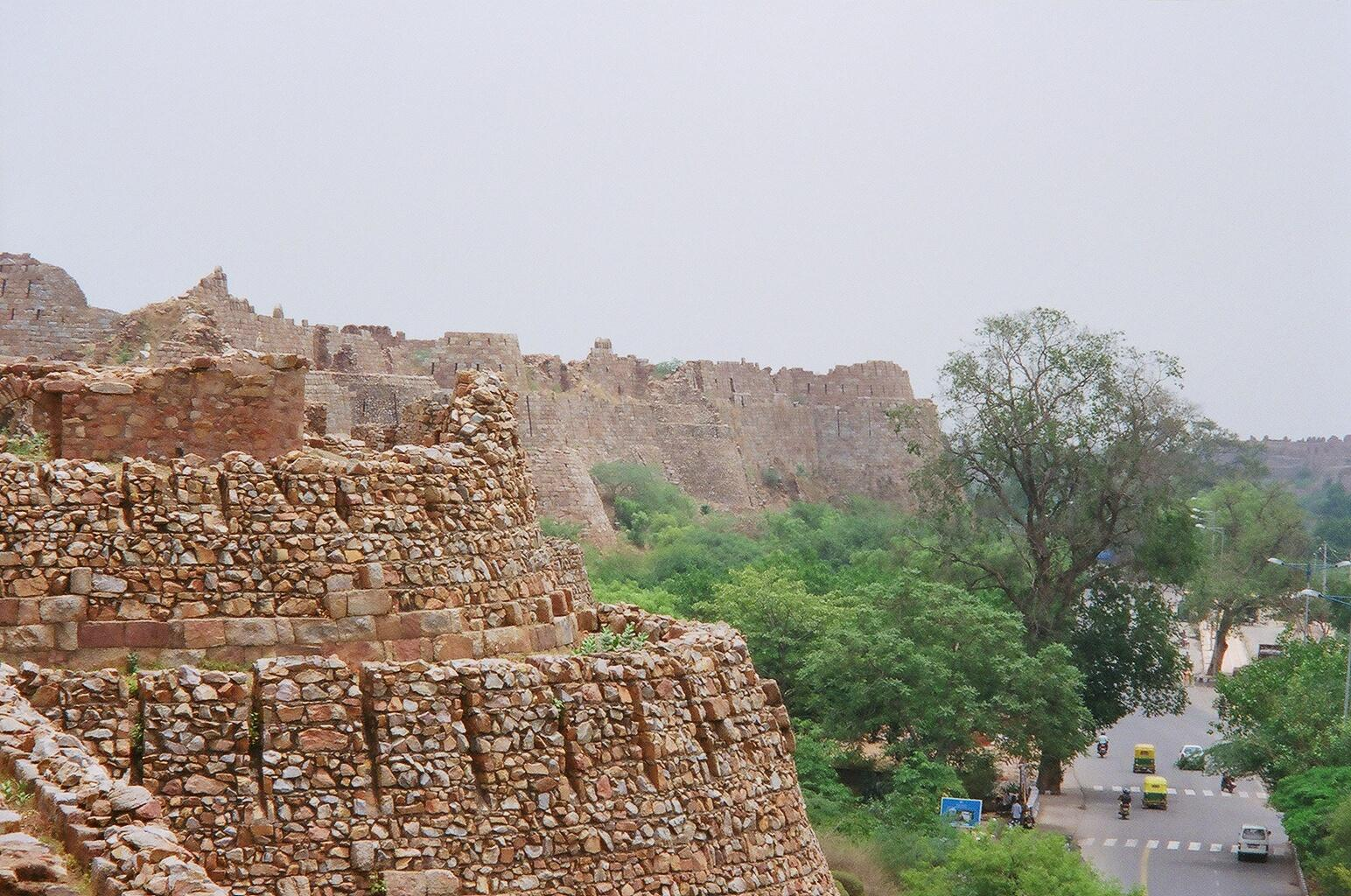
- The walls of the citadel of Tughlaqabad Fort in Delhi, India. The walls and towers are reinforced with a solid talus.

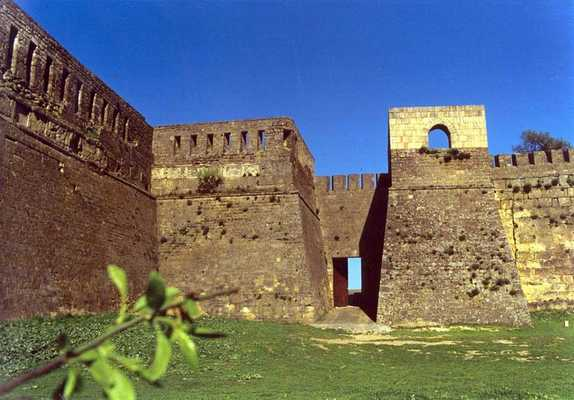
- The walls of the Sasanian fortress at Derbent, the southernmost city in Russia, featuring tall taluses.

== See also ==
- Glacis
- Counterscarp
- Siege
