= Glacis =

Protective slope built into a fortification

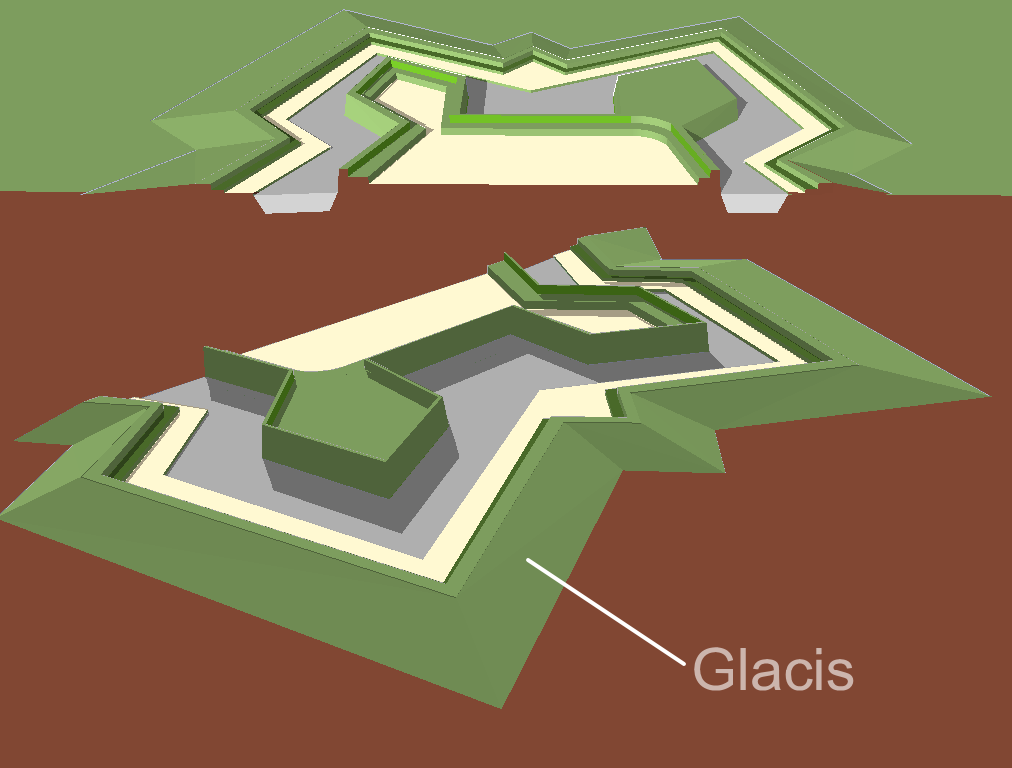
Diagram showing upward sloped glacis

A glacis (/ˈɡleɪ.sɪs/, French: [ɡlasi]) in military engineering is an artificial slope as part of a medieval castle or in early modern fortresses. They may be constructed of earth as a temporary structure or of stone in more permanent structure. More generally, a glacis is any slope, natural or artificial, which fulfils the above requirements. The etymology of this French word suggests a slope made dangerous with ice, hence the relationship with glacier.

A glacis plate is the sloped front-most section of the hull of a tank or other armoured fighting vehicle.

== Ancient fortifications ==
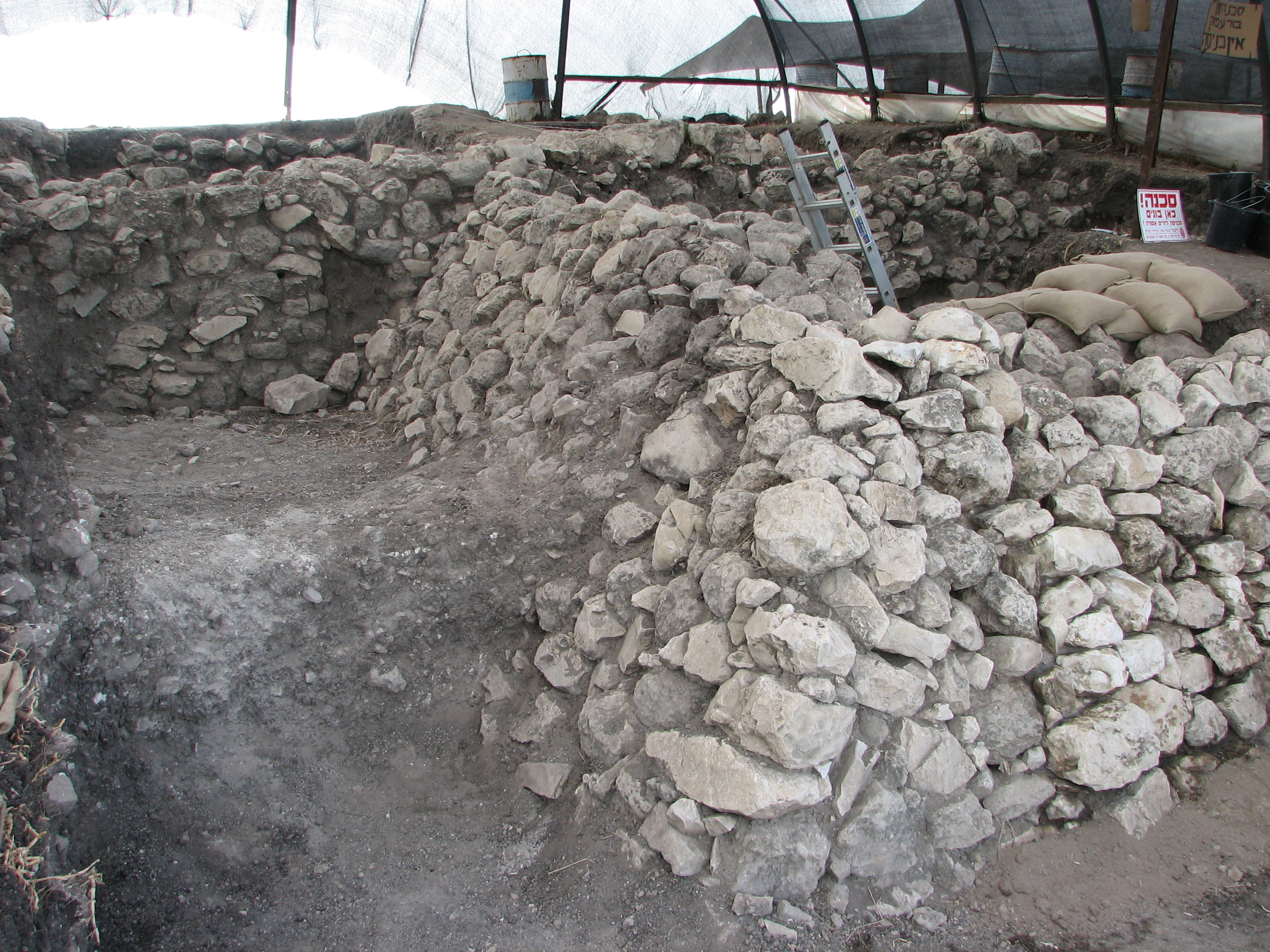
Middle Bronze Age glacis in 'En Esur, Israel

A glacis could also appear in ancient fortresses, such as the one the ancient Egyptians built at Semna in Nubia. Here it was used to prevent enemy siege engines from weakening defensive walls.

Hillforts in Britain started to incorporate glacis around 350 BC. Those at Maiden Castle, Dorset were 25 metres (82 ft) high.

== Medieval fortifications ==
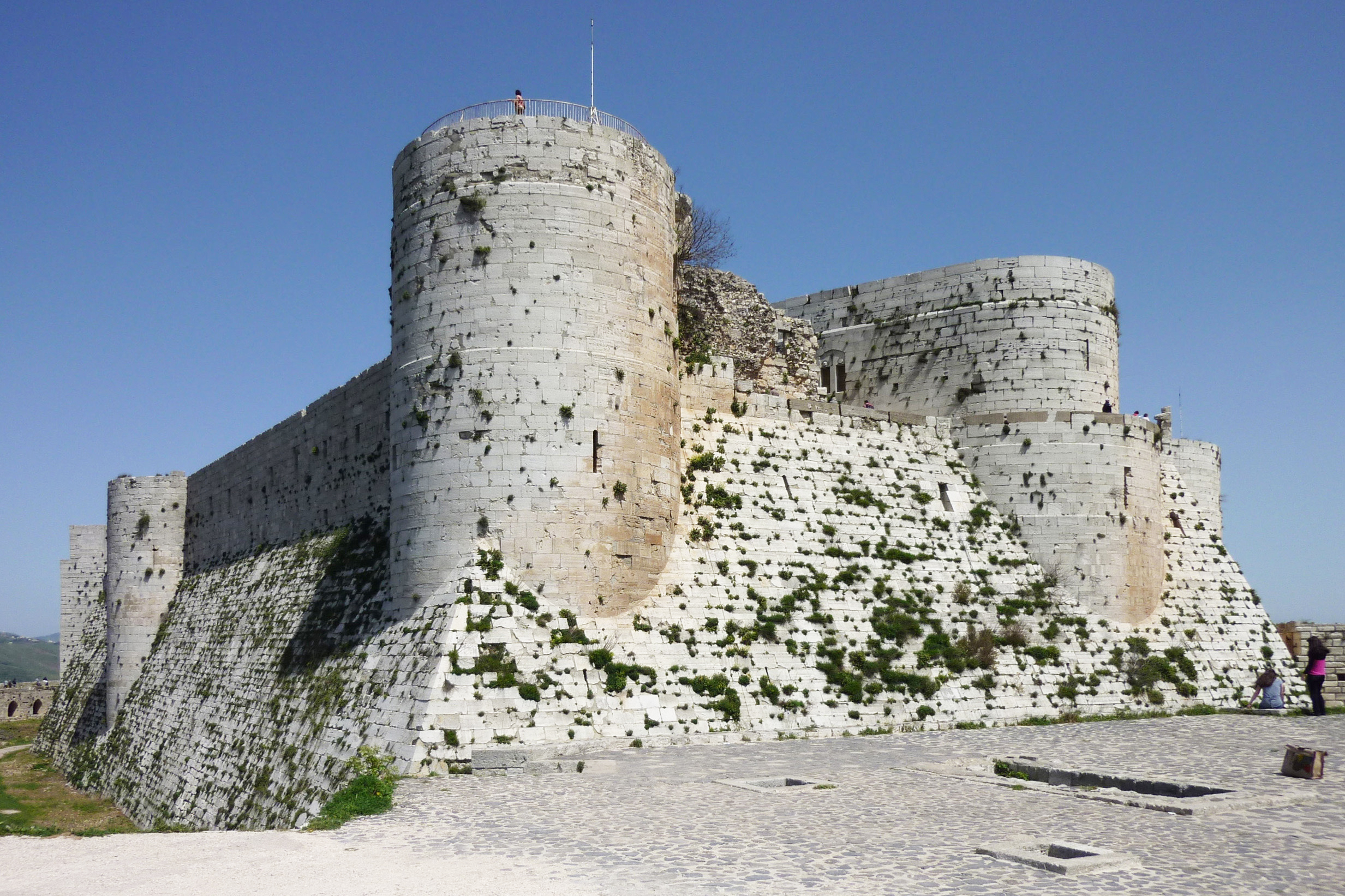
Krak des Chevaliers, a medieval Crusader castle in Syria. The south face of the inner ward with its steep glacis.

Glacises, also called taluses, were incorporated into medieval fortifications to strengthen the walls against undermining, to hamper escalades and so that missiles dropped from the battlements would ricochet off the glacis into attacking forces.

Towards the end of the medieval period some castles were modified to make them defensible against cannons. Glacis of earthen slopes faced with stones were placed in front of the curtain walls and bastions (towers) to absorb the impact of cannon shots, or to deflect them. Towers were lowered to the same height as the curtain walls and converted into gun platforms.

== Early modern European fortifications ==
Early modern European fortresses were constructed to keep any potential assailant under the fire of the defenders until the last possible moment. On natural, level ground, troops attacking any high work have a degree of shelter from its fire when close up to it; the glacis consists of a slope with a low grade inclined towards the top of the wall. This gave defenders a direct line of sight into the assaulting force, allowing them to efficiently sweep the field with fire from the parapet. Additionally, but secondarily, the bank of earth would shield the walls from being hit directly by cannon fire.

Though defenders on high ground already have a direct line of sight, a glacis allows the field of fire to be swept more efficiently, by minimizing changes to the angle of their guns while firing. The glacis prevents attacking cannon from having a clear shot at the walls of a fortress, as usually these cannot be seen until the glacis is crossed and the ditch, bounded on either side by the smooth, masoned scarp and counterscarp, is reached.

== Armored vehicles ==
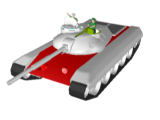
The glacis of a tank's armor is the sloped part at the front, marked in red.

The term glacis plate describes the sloped front-most section of the hull of a tank or other armored fighting vehicle, often composed of upper and lower halves. In a head-on-head armored engagement, the glacis plate is the largest and most obvious target available to an enemy gunner.

Sloped armour has two advantages: many projectiles will deflect rather than penetrate. Those that penetrate will have to travel on a longer diagonal route through any given thickness of armor, than if it were perpendicular to their trajectory.

Anti-tank mines that employ a tilt-rod fuze are also designed to detonate directly underneath the glacis plate. As a result, it is generally the thickest, most robust armored section of a tank, followed by the turret face and gun mantlet.

== Gallery ==
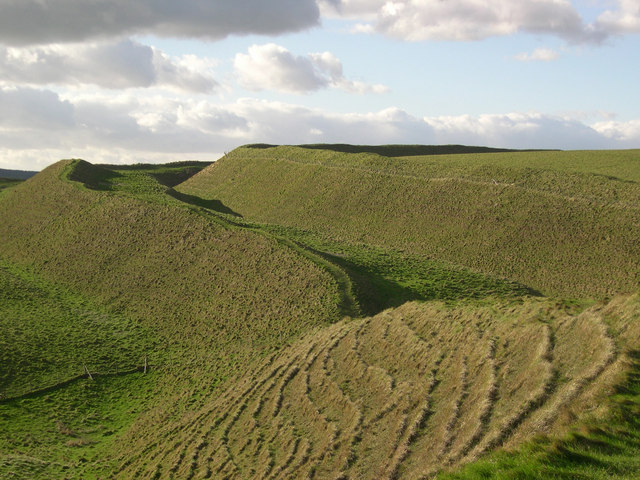
Iron Age ramparts and ditches in Maiden Castle.

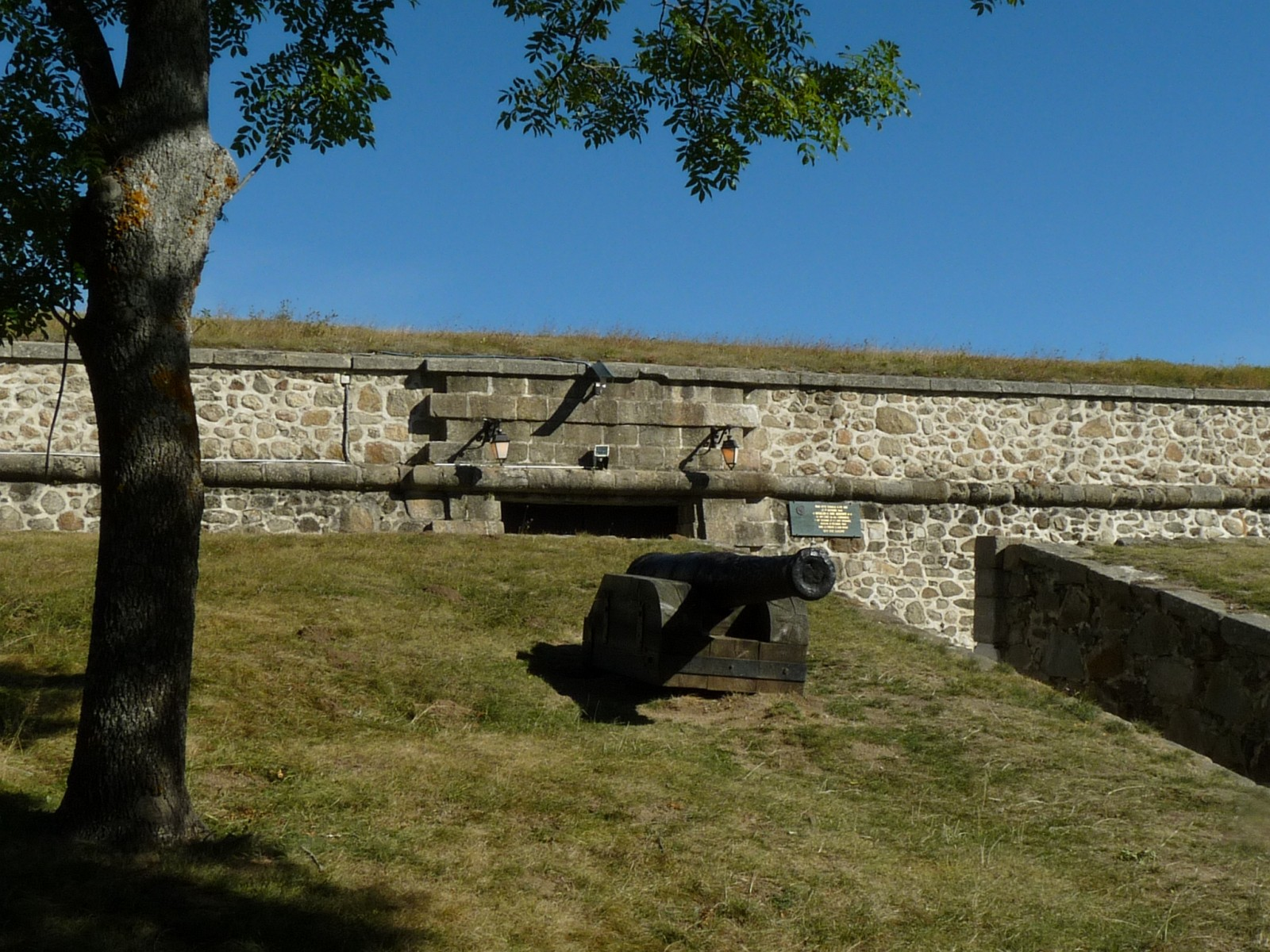
Glacis, Mont-Louis Fortress, Pyrénées-Orientales, France

== See also ==
- Fortification
- Siege

== Bibliography ==
- Jackson, Louis (1911). "Fortification and Siegecraft" . In Chisholm, Hugh (ed.). Encyclopædia Britannica. Vol. 10 (11th ed.). Cambridge University Press. pp. 679–725.
- Decaëns, Joseph; Dubois, Adrien, eds. (2010). Caen Castle: A Ten Centuries Old Fortress (illustrated ed.). Publications du Crahm. p. 17. ISBN 9782902685752.
- Dyer, James (1992). Hillforts of England and Wales. Shire Series. Vol. 16 (illustrated, revised ed.). Osprey Publishing. p. 19. ISBN 9780747801801.
- Stokstad, Marilyn (2005). Medieval Castles. Greenwood guides to historic events of the medieval world (illustrated, annotated ed.). Greenwood Publishing Group. p. 84. ISBN 9780313325250.
