= Black Prince (tank) =

British infantry tank prototype

Tank, Infantry, Black Prince
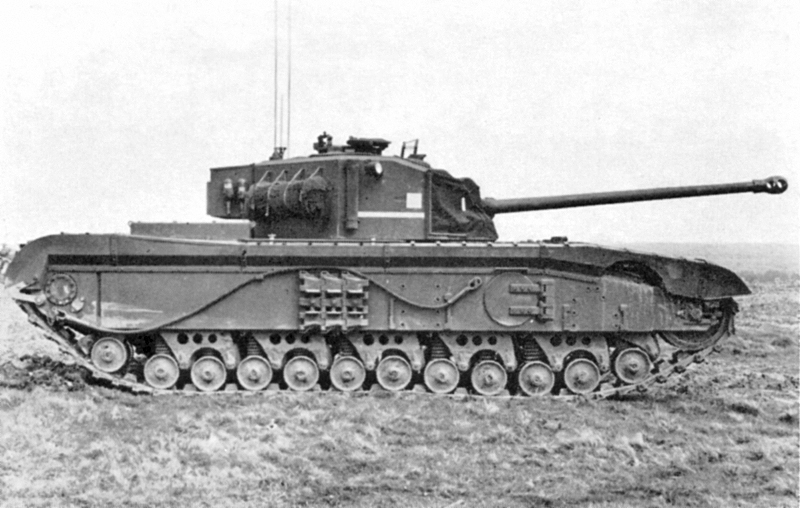
- Side view of the prototype A43 Black Prince
- Type: Infantry tank
- Place of origin: United Kingdom

Production history
- Designer: Vauxhall
- Designed: 1943
- Manufacturer: Vauxhall
- Produced: 1945
- No. built: 6 prototypes

Specifications
- Mass: 50 long tons (51 t)
- Length: 28 ft 11 in (8.81 m)
- Width: 11 ft 3.5 in (3.442 m)
- Height: 9 ft (2.7 m)
- Crew: 5 (Commander, gunner, loader, driver, hull gunner)
- Armour: 152 mm (6.0 in) Front
- Main armament: QF 17 pdr with 89 rounds
- Secondary armament: 2 × 7.92 mm Besa machine guns
- Engine: Bedford Type 120 horizontally opposed 12-cylinder 350 hp (260 kW)
- Power/weight: 7 hp/ton
- Suspension: sprung bogie
- Operational range: about 100 mi (160 km)
- Maximum speed: 10.5 mph (16.9 km/h) on road 7.5 mph (12.1 km/h) off-road

Tank, Infantry, Black Prince (A43) is the name that was assigned to an experimental development of the Churchill tank with a larger, wider hull and a QF 17-pounder (76.2 mm) gun. It was named after Edward, the Black Prince, son of Edward III and heir to the English throne.

== Development ==
As a development from the Churchill, the Black Prince was a continuation of the line of infantry tanks. These types of tanks were slower, heavier tanks intended to operate in close support of infantry. They were also able to work closely with other tanks. The parallel development in British tank design were the Cruiser tanks, which were intended for more mobile operations. A43 was the General Staff Specification number issued in 1943 for an interim tank that would eventually be superseded by a "universal tank" that would replace both Infantry and Cruiser tanks.

The cruiser line led to the Cromwell and its 17 pounder-armed Challenger variant, eventually followed by the Comet equipped with the 77 mm gun firing similar ammunition to the 17 pounder. These tanks entered service during the war. While not as heavily protected as the Churchill, the Comet showed the way British tank development was going. This led to the last of the cruiser line and the first of the Universal tanks (now more widely known as main battle tanks), the very successful Centurion.

A larger gun than that carried by a conventional Churchill required a larger turret on a wider turret ring and consequently a widening of the tank hull. The Black Prince weighed around ten tons more than the Churchill so the suspension was modified and the tracks widened by 10 inches to carry the extra load. However, the Churchill's 350-horsepower (260 kW) engine was retained, leading to the tank being underpowered and slow, with maximum speeds 10.5 mph (16.9 km/h) on roads and 7.5 mph (12.1 km/h) cross country. This was so slow that the tank's tactical usefulness would have been limited. Consideration was given to the use of the Rolls-Royce Meteor engine; this would have increased the available power to 600 hp (450 kW), but the idea never left the drawing–board. Likewise, plans to fit the Black Prince with the turret from the Centurion were never carried out.

By the time the Black Prince prototypes had appeared in May 1945, the 17-pounder armed Sherman Firefly had proved itself in combat, the Comet tank was in service and the introduction of Centurion was imminent. All these tanks carried the QF 17-pounder or an equivalent; all had better mobility than the Black Prince and the Centurion had frontal armour of comparable effectiveness. (Note: The Centurion had thinner, 101-millimetre (4.0 in), frontal armour but it was sloped increasing its effective protection.) The Black Prince had become redundant and the project was abandoned.

The Black Prince marked the end of the development of the A22F Churchill Mk VII, and the end of the infantry tank concept in British tank design.

== Survivors ==
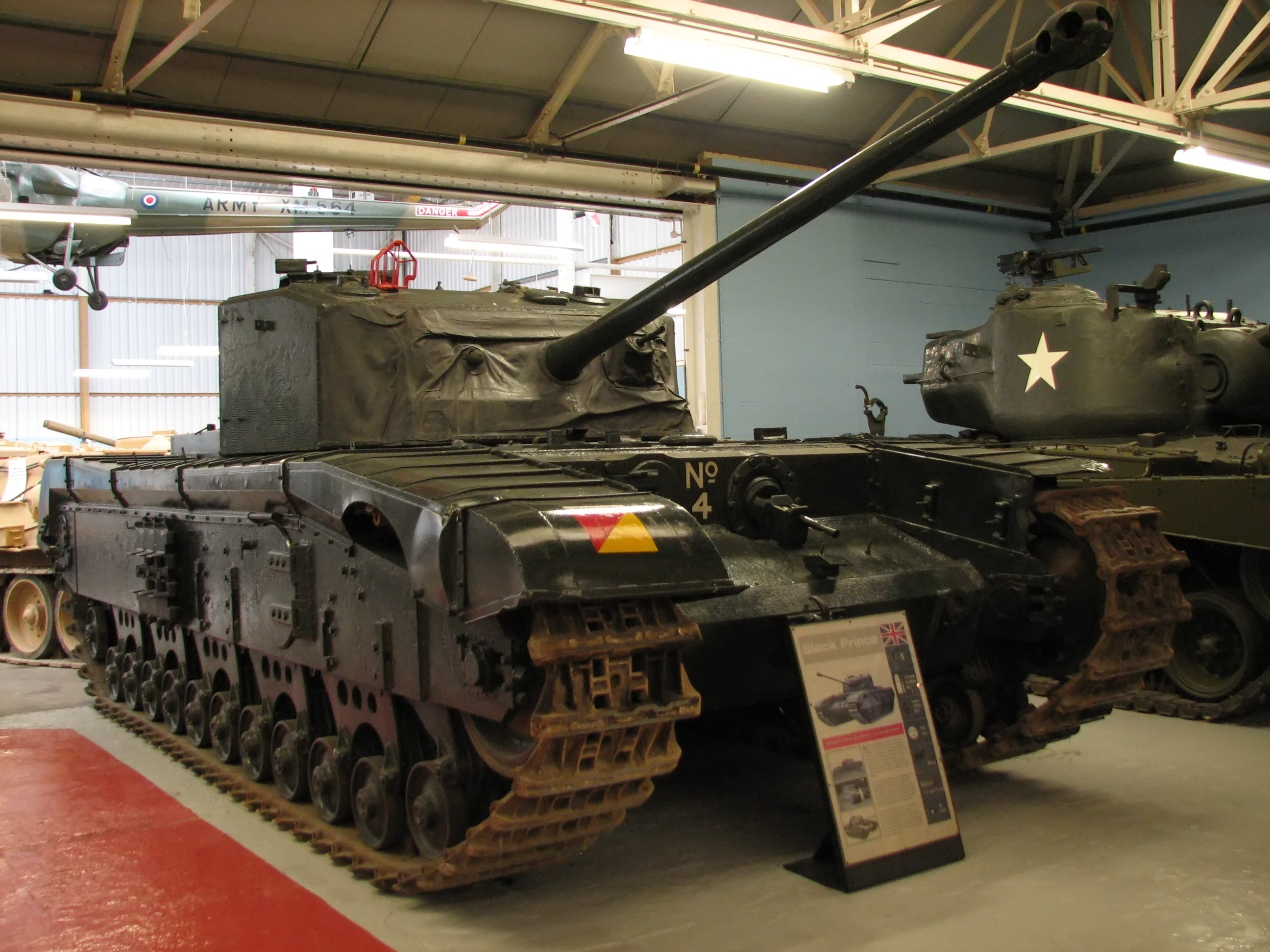
Black Prince prototype number four, at The Tank Museum (2008). The red-painted frame on the turret top is a sighting vane to allow rough but quick alignment of the gun in traverse when viewed through the commander's periscope

The only intact Black Prince is held by The Tank Museum in Bovington, UK; it is the fourth of the six prototypes that were built. It has recently been restored to running condition. A Black Prince hull was recovered from Salisbury Plain in the 1980s as part of the Tony Budge Collection, and is now held by the Rex and Rod Cadman Collection.

== See also ==
- Excelsior tank - infantry tank design based on Cromwell tank
