= Cruiser Mk VIII Challenger =

British WWII tank

Tank, Cruiser, Challenger (A30)
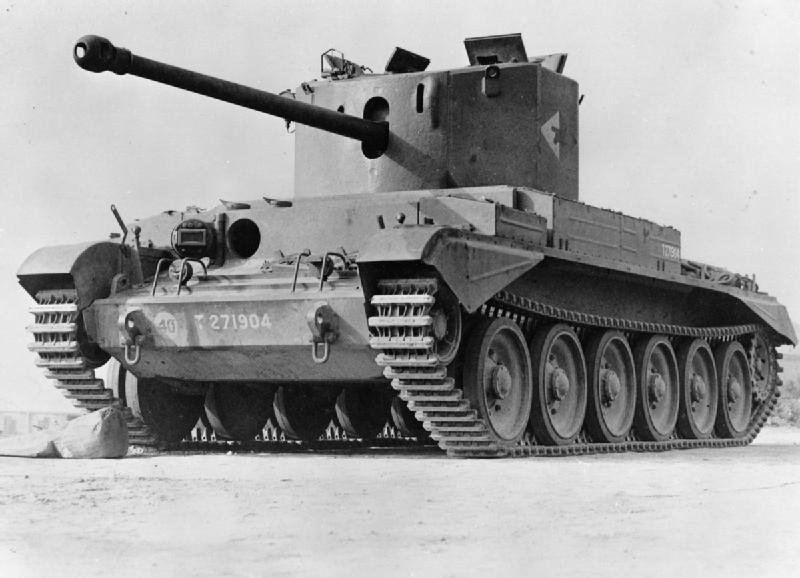
- Cruiser tank Challenger (A30)
- Type: Cruiser tank
- Place of origin: United Kingdom

Service history
- Used by: United Kingdom; Czechoslovak government-in-exile Polish Armed Forces in the West; Czechoslovakia

Production history
- Designer: Birmingham Railway Carriage & Wagon Company
- Produced: 1944–1945
- No. built: 200

Specifications
- Mass: 31.5 long tons (32.0 t)
- Length: 26 ft 4 in (8.03 m)
- Width: 9 ft 6.5 in (2.91 m)
- Height: 9 ft 1.25 in (2.77 m)
- Crew: 5 (Commander, gunner, loader, co-loader, driver)
- Armour: 20–102 mm (0.79–4.02 in)
- Main armament: Ordnance QF 17 pounder (76.2 mm); 42 rounds
- Secondary armament: 0.30 Browning machine gun
- Engine: Rolls-Royce Meteor V-12 petrol engine 600 hp (450 kW)
- Power/weight: 18.8 hp (14 kW) / tonne
- Suspension: Christie suspension 6 road wheels
- Operational range: 105 mi (169 km)
- Maximum speed: 32 mph (51 km/h)

The Tank, Cruiser, Challenger (A30) was a British tank of World War II. It mounted the QF 17-pounder anti-tank gun on a chassis derived from the Cromwell tank to add anti-tank firepower to the cruiser tank units. The design compromises made in fitting the large gun onto the Cromwell chassis resulted in a tank with a powerful weapon and reduced armour. However, the extemporised 17-pounder Sherman Firefly conversion of the US-supplied Sherman proved easier to produce and, with delays in production, only 200 Challengers were built. The Challenger was able to keep up with the fast Cromwell tank and was used with them.

== History ==
Development of the Challenger was led by William Arthur Robotham. "Roy" Robotham had been a Rolls-Royce executive in the car division who, with no work to do, had led a team to develop a tank powerplant from the Rolls-Royce Merlin aircraft engine. The Rolls-Royce Meteor gave the British a powerful, reliable engine, which was used in the A27M Cruiser Mk VIII Cromwell tank. Robotham's contributions gained him a place in the Ministry of Supply and on the Tank Board, despite his lack of experience in tank design.

The General Staff brought forward specification A29 for a 45 ton, 17 pounder-armed cruiser tank based on needs identified in the African desert campaign. British tanks were generally underarmed compared to German vehicles. The design weight of this vehicle was subsequently seen as excessive and the specification was passed over in favour of the alternate specification, A30, which was 10 long tons (10 t) lighter. In 1942, an order for the development of an A30 based tank was placed with Birmingham Railway Carriage & Wagon Company (BRC&W) expecting it to be based on the Cromwell components also being manufactured by BRC&W. The turret and gun mounting were in the hands of Stothert & Pitt. Birmingham Carriage had to modify the Cromwell hull to take a bigger turret.

The first prototype was ready in August 1942, only seven months after development had commenced, but proved to be very flawed. An improved second prototype was presented in January 1943 but was still considered unacceptable. A committee met to determine whether a requirement for a 17-pounder tank existed. The Challenger had been developed in anticipation of more heavily armoured Axis tanks, following the trend in Nazi German tank design. At roughly the same time the Tiger I entered service with the German army, placing an immediate need for a 17-pounder armed tank in response. When the second prototype was tested at Lulworth, it was found that although it would be effective at long range against the current best-gunned tank in German service (the Panzer IV "Special" with the long 75 mm (3.0 in) gun), at shorter ranges it would be at a disadvantage due to its slow firing rate and thin armour. The design received additional emphasis when, in May 1943, it was found that the Cromwell could not carry its intended armament. Vickers had been developing a 75 mm (3.0 in) 50-calibre-long high-velocity tank gun. It was realised late in the design process that the Cromwell's turret ring was too small for this gun. The Challenger would be the only British cruiser tank to mount a weapon that could tackle heavier German armour until the arrival of the A34 Comet. So in February 1943 an order was made of two hundred vehicles; the Army General Staff took five months to approve the Challenger design for production (in February 1943, the only significant alteration was to the ammunition stowage), and Robotham was also critical of the decision to continue manufacturing the Cromwell with a 6-pounder gun (the 17-pounder gun was "infinitely better").

British tank production was constrained by limited resources and insufficient numbers could be made. This was compensated by American production. In the lead up to D-Day, Sherman tanks were fitted with the 17 pounder, creating the interim 17 pounder Sherman Firefly. Converting Sherman tanks was simpler than producing Challengers, so it was decided in November 1943 to terminate the A30 production run after the two hundred vehicles had been built, allowing BRC&W to concentrate on the Cromwell. At the same time, the A40 "Challenger Stage II" project was cancelled, which had envisaged a 36 tonne type with heavier armour. Future design priority was concentrated on the A34 Comet, which eventually replaced the Cromwell, Firefly and Challenger. Challenger production started in March 1944. That year, 145 vehicles were delivered with another 52 in 1945. Production was in two batches. A first run of forty vehicles had a 40 mm gun mantlet; with the second batch, this was replaced by a 102 mm mantlet. From the hundredth vehicle onwards, appliqué 25 mm armour plates were fitted on the turret - these had already been applied to existing vehicles by field units.

The tank was rendered obsolete when the Vickers HV 75 mm gun was developed to become the 77 mm HV (actually 3 inch = 76.2 mm calibre) to arm the Comet tank. The 77 mm HV used the same projectiles as the 17 pounder with a reduced propellant charge. The 17 pounder gun was used on the earliest marks of the Comet's successor, the Centurion tank.

== Design ==
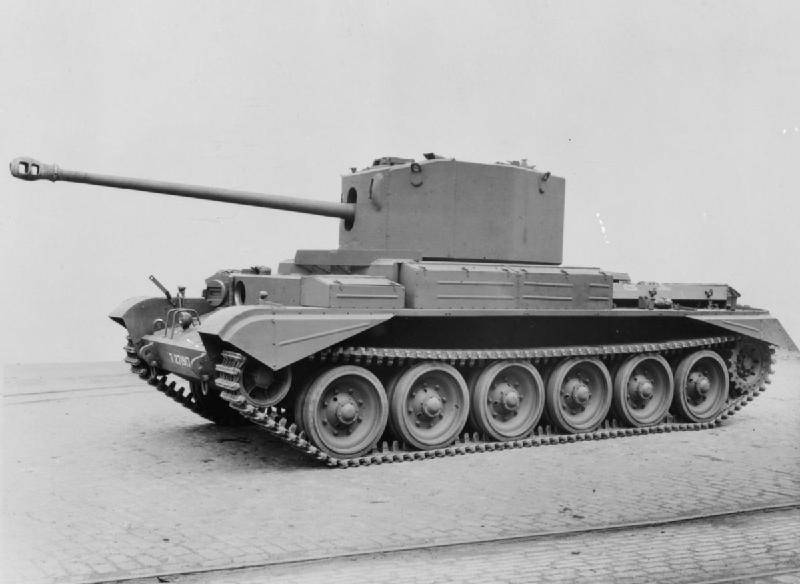
Cruiser tank Challenger (A30)

The turret mounted the Ordnance QF 17-pounder gun required in the Tank Board specification and the hull machine gun was removed to provide stowage space for the long 17-pounder cartridges. The War Office expected that this larger ammunition, together with its stowage forward, would require two loaders alongside the commander and gunner in the turret. To fit the larger weapon and additional crewman in the turret, a much larger turret than that of the Cromwell was specified, developed separately, which had a significant effect on the design and was not resolved until later development of Avenger.

To carry the weight of the 17-pounder and ammunition, an extra wheel station and suspension arm was needed, lengthening the hull. This change in length, without a corresponding change in width across the tracks, reduced mobility compared to the Cromwell, although speed remained high at 25 mph. To limit the weight, the amount of armour was reduced but this could only be achieved on the turret, 63 mm (2.5 in) on the front (the mantlet was 102 mm of IT 90) and 40 mm (1.6 in) on the sides compared to 75 mm (3.0 in) and 60 mm (2.4 in) on the Cromwell. Applique armour, 25 mm thick, was later added to turret and hull front. The turret did not use a conventional turret ring: to increase the aperture diameter by four inches, it rested on a ball mount on the hull floor. Therefore, the base of the turret was unprotected, and it would cantilever if struck by enemy rounds. A jacking feature, with four internal semi-automatic jacks, was fitted to clear jams. The additional length allowed larger hatches to be fitted in the hull while still clearing the turret, providing easier access than Cromwell.

Upon Robotham's appointment as Chief Engineer to the Department of Tank Design, the lack of progress on an (A29) 17-pounder armed tank could not adequately be explained. Robotham's memoirs indicate a lack of awareness that any such requirement existed within the department and military users were still unsure whether the tank was required at the point when the rushed A30 design had been completed and prototype vehicles run. The Challenger was then rushed into production alongside existing production runs of Cromwell, limiting the number of tanks that could be produced.

== Performance ==
The 17-pounder gun mounted on the Challenger offered sufficient performance against the majority of German AFVs, including the Tiger I and Panther tank and the tank had a higher top speed and cross country mobility than the Panzer IV or StuG III. The Challenger could only hold 48 rounds of the large 17-pounder ammunition because the General Staff required four men in the turret, though later tanks like the Centurion used a three-man turret. The armour of the Challenger offered very little protection against contemporary German anti-tank guns and was lower than that of the Cromwell, which often operated with Challengers.

In combat, the Challenger fulfilled much the same role as the Sherman Firefly, providing overwatch for the other tanks in the troop, as its 17-pounder could penetrate almost all German AFVs frontally, unlike the 75 mm. It was deployed in a similar manner at a troop level, this was typically one 17-pounder armed tank (such as Challenger or Firefly) to three 75 mm armed tanks (Cromwells or Shermans); at times, the deployment of 17-pounder armed tanks was increased to two per troop.

The Challenger was based on the reliable Cromwell tank, which used the new Rolls-Royce Meteor engine, which was far more reliable and powerful than the ageing Liberty engine used in earlier British Cruiser designs like the Crusader tank. Its reliability was slightly below that of the Cromwell, as a problem was experienced with track throwing, caused by mud building up in the wheels but this was resolved in the field. Supply and maintenance were vastly simplified through the use of common parts with the Cromwell.

In comparison with the Firefly, the tank lacked the sloping forward armour but presented a lower profile and avoided the Firefly's constraint on gun depression. The Challenger provided 10° of gun depression while Firefly was limited to 5°, which was a significant disadvantage in combat. It was preferred within Cromwell units as it shared similar mobility and manoeuvrability, whereas the Firefly was slower. Despite a lower design weight than the earlier A29 specification (32½ not 34 tons), the Challenger was heavy and required dockyard equipment to ship, making it impractical to use in amphibious assaults, such as the D-day landings.

== Service ==
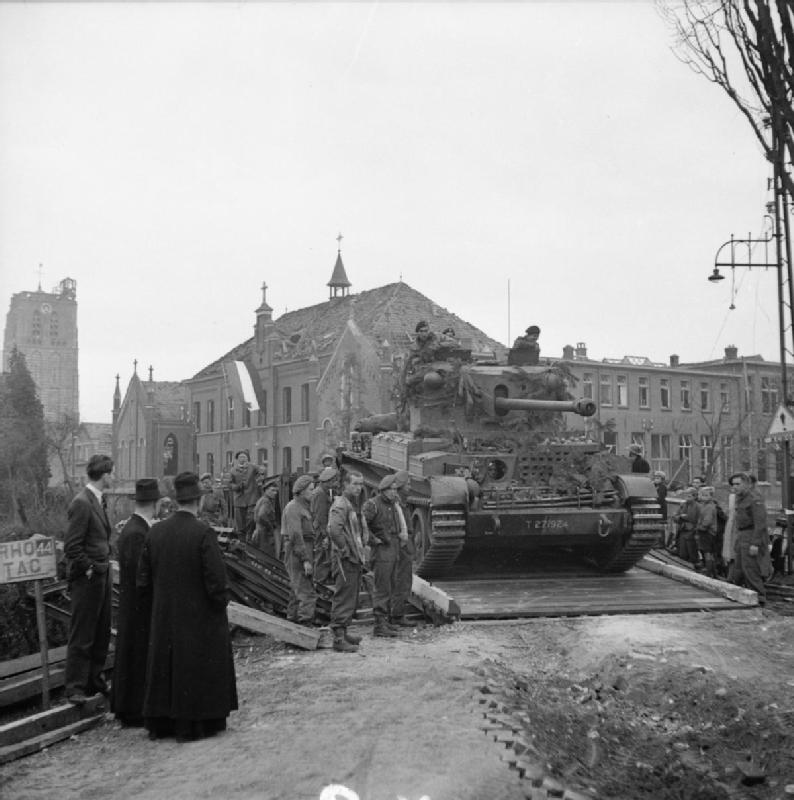
A Challenger tank crosses a Bailey bridge over the Dommel river in Sint-Michielsgestel, the Netherlands. 27 October 1944.

No provision was made for deep wading, before the design went into production; as a result, the A30 could not be landed in the initial phase of the Allied invasion of Normandy. Challenger crews had to wait until July 1944, when Mulberry harbours were operational and ports had been captured.

The Challenger and Firefly, equipped with 17-pounder, were added to tank squadrons to deal with opposing heavy tanks and many Challengers were issued to reconnaissance units using Cromwells. It was initially used by the Guards Armoured Division and the 11th Armoured Division, with about sixteen vehicles in each unit: one Challenger and three Cromwells in each troop. The latter division phased the type out from February 1945 onwards, while it was being introduced to the Cromwell units of the 7th Armoured Division. The tank was unpopular at first, with crews complaining about the lack of armour, the high silhouette and the tracks being thrown. The track problem was caused by the smaller idler wheels compared to the Cromwell; in August, these were replaced by idlers with a standard diameter. Troops used to the low profile of the Crusader and Cromwell found the height a serious problem, although it was still lower than the comparable Sherman Firefly.

Confidence in the vehicle grew and it became preferred over the Firefly, being lower, faster and more manoeuvrable but the early bad reputation persisted with others. Allied forces were issued with the Challenger, the 1st Polish Armoured Division receiving several in mid-1945 and the 1st Czechoslovak Independent Armoured Brigade used it (Unit Entitlements at the end of 1944 for CIABG was four Challengers) during the siege of Dunkirk in late 1944. After the war, the Czechoslovak government purchased 22 Challengers from the brigade inventory, which served in the Czechoslovak army (first with the 11th, later 23rd, Tank Brigade and then with the 13th Independent Tank Battalion) until they were put in reserve in 1951 and scrapped in 1959.

== Variants ==
The A30 Avenger SP2 or SP 17pdr, A30 (Avenger) was a development of the Challenger to be used as a self-propelled gun. It removed the second loader's position and featured a much lower profile turret and lower superstructure on the hull. An additional stowage bin was provided on the glacis plate for a large camo net and return rollers were added to the tracks.

The Avenger featured a permanent opening in the turret roof covered with an armoured cover supported a few inches above. This provided the commander and loader with full 360 degree visibility.

By the time the pilot was complete, the British had lend-lease M10s for anti-tank work coming into service and the production of Avenger was de-prioritised in favour of Comet production.

As many as 500 vehicles appear to have been planned and 230 vehicles were ordered from BRC&W, but this dropped to 80 with the end of the war. It is not known how many were actually built; the SP2 nomenclature indicates its place in production with the Archer (SP1) and Alecto (SP3).

The Avenger suffered in trials as the engine had to remain running to use the turret traverse motor, because the noise and exhaust could give the vehicle away. Winter trials in a prolonged stationary position also failed in comparison with Archer, when the Avenger's steering failed. Both vehicles had problems with camouflage. The vehicle was dropped from trials in 1950, along with removal of the 17pdr SP Achilles (re-gunned US M10 GMC- equipped with 17pdr).

While the Avenger was only used for trials and was ultimately unsuccessful in comparison with the purpose built vehicles, it provides an example of what could have been possible for the Challenger had it not been forced to accommodate a second loader in a larger (four-man) turret in its design. It may have been corrected had effort not been moved to the Comet.

== Survivors ==
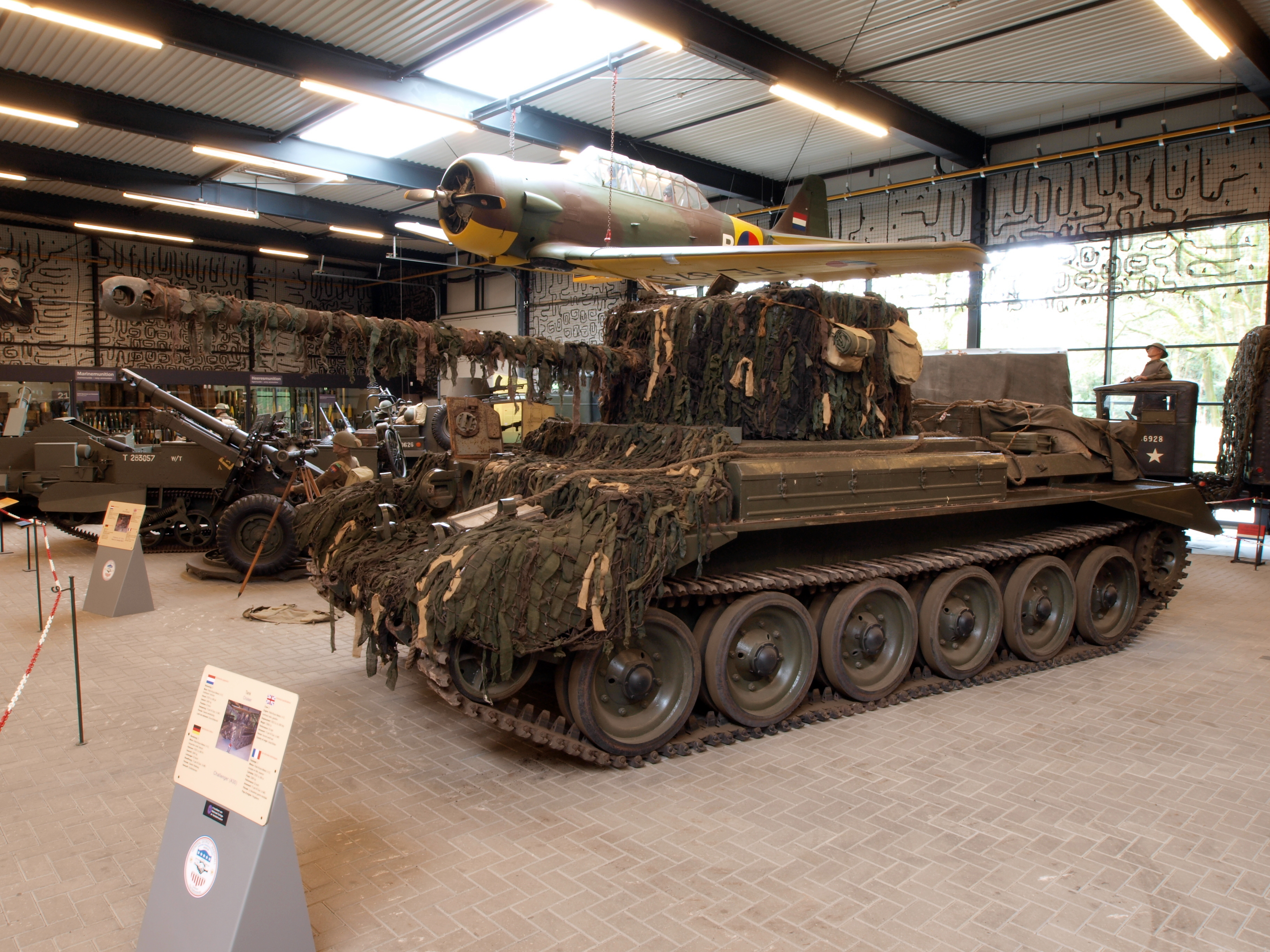
A30 Challenger, Overloon War Museum

Two vehicles survive, one at the Overloon War Museum in the Netherlands, acquired from the Muzeeaquarium Delfzijl in 1976; the other was awaiting restoration at the Isle of Wight Military Museum in the United Kingdom until its closure. Once restored, it will be displayed at the Bovington Tank Museum.
