= Cambridge Carrier =

Cambridge Carrier may refer to:

- Thomas Hobson (carrier) (c. 1544 – 1631), of Cambridge, England, known as the origin of Hobson's choice
- a development of the Oxford Tracked Carrier, a British armoured personnel carrier
