= 17-pdr SP Achilles =

British self-propelled anti-tank gun

17pdr SP M10 "Achilles"
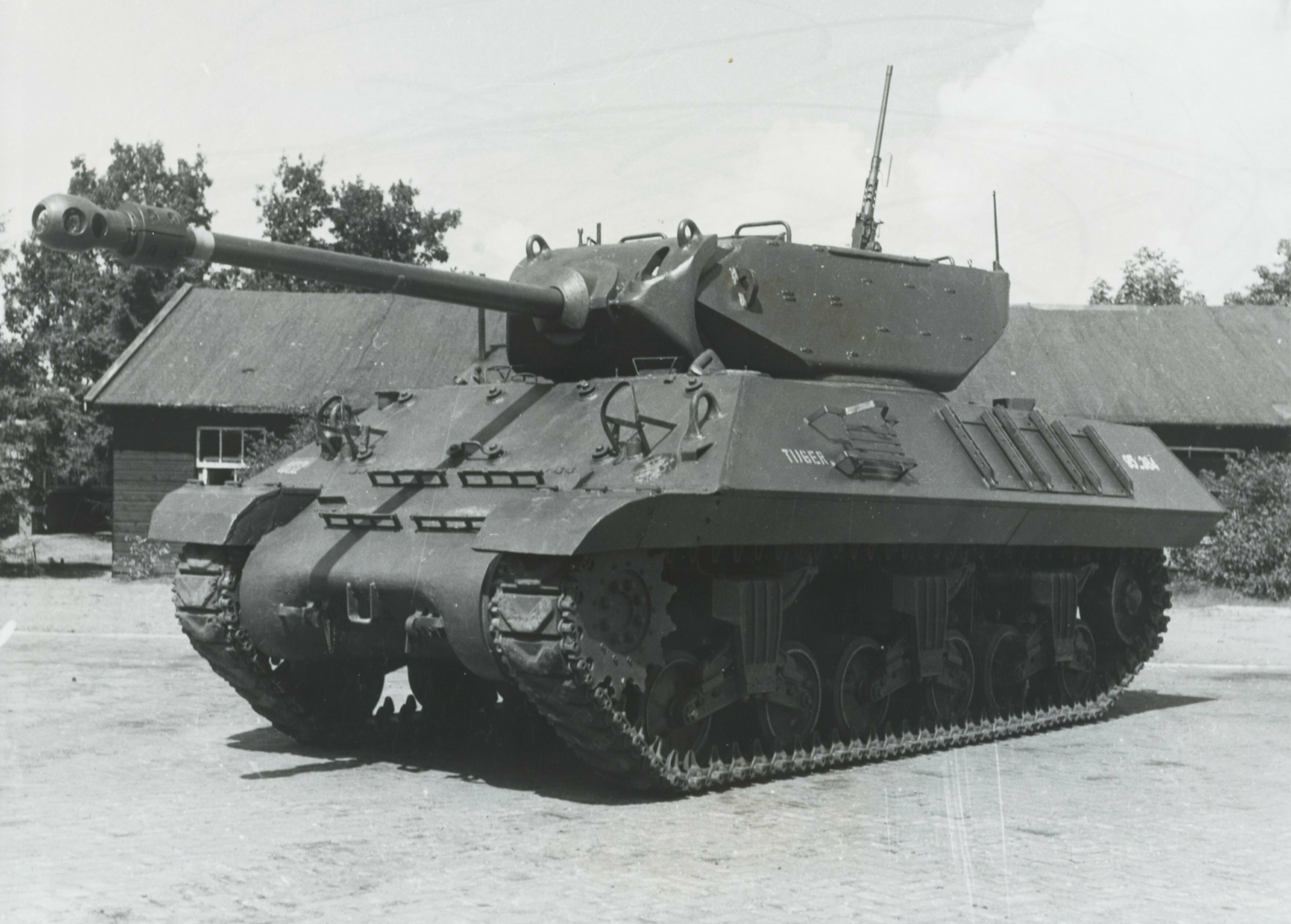
- Achilles nickname "Tiger" in Dutch service, 1950
- Type: Self-propelled anti-tank gun
- Place of origin: United Kingdom

Production history
- Manufacturer: Fisher Tank Arsenal Grand Blanc, Michigan - converted by Royal Arsenal, Woolwich
- No. built: 1,100

Specifications
- Mass: 29.6 tonnes (65,000 lb)
- Length: 7.01 m (23 ft 8 1/4 in) including gun 5.97 m (19 ft 7 in) excluding gun
- Width: 3.05 m (10 ft)
- Height: 2.57 m (8 ft 2 in)
- Crew: 5 (commander, loader, gunner, loader's assistant, driver)
- Armour: 9 to 57.2 mm (0.3 to 2.3 in)
- Main armament: 76.2 mm Ordnance QF 17-pounder 50 rounds
- Secondary armament: .50 in (12.7 mm) Browning M2HB AA machine gun 420 rounds.303 (7.62 mm) Bren light machine gun
- Engine: General Motors 6046 diesel (twin 6-71); 375 hp (276 kW)
- Power/weight: 12.5 hp/tonne
- Suspension: Vertical Volute Spring Suspension (VVSS)
- Operational range: 300 km (186 mi)
- Maximum speed: 51 km/h (32 mph)

The 17pdr SP Achilles (officially 17 pounder, Self-Propelled, Achilles) is a British variant of the American M10 tank destroyer armed with the British Ordnance QF 17-pounder high-velocity 76.2 mm (3-inch) anti-tank gun in place of the M10's comparatively less powerful 3-inch (76.2 mm) Gun M7. A total of 1,100 M10s were converted to Achilles, making it the second most numerous armoured fighting vehicle to carry the 17-pounder gun, behind the Sherman Firefly tank.

The name "Achilles" was officially a designation applied to both the 3-inch gun and 17-pounder versions (as Achilles I/II and Achilles Ic/IIc respectively) but was little used during the Second World War; at the time, the vehicle was called 17pdr M10, or 17pdr SP M10, or even occasionally, "Firefly". It has since become identified almost exclusively with the 17 pounder version.

== Origins ==
In the wake of Germany's successful 1939–41 campaigns, US armour doctrine had incorporated the idea of fast, lightly armoured vehicles carrying high-velocity anti-tank guns as the best way to deal with the fast-moving spearheads of the German blitzkrieg. The M10 was based on the chassis of the M4 Sherman but carrying thinner although more sloped armour in order to comply with the high-speed requirement for the tank. At the same time, the British had been examining the possibility of designing a low-silhouette self-propelled anti-tank gun, preferably with a 360-degree traversing turret, with armour that would be able to resist the German 5 cm KwK 39 gun fitted to German tanks at 800 yards and mounting the 17-pounder anti-tank gun. However, with the arrival of the M10 on the battlefield in late 1942, British plans for a turreted self-propelled gun were cancelled.

During the North African campaign, the British did use self-propelled AT guns such as 6-pdr Deacon. The Valentine tank chassis was fitted with the 17-pdr to create the Archer which was used later in north-west Europe.

The armour of the M10 provided good protection against the 50 mm gun mounted on most German tanks and anti-tank guns. The M10 was first made available to the British in 1943. These vehicles were open-topped and mounted a 3-inch (76.2 mm) M7 American gun, which was significantly more powerful than the Ordnance QF 6-pounder that was mounted on British tanks of the period and was of equal power to the 7.5 cm KwK 40 used by the Panzer IV tank and Sturmgeschütz III assault gun.

== Design ==
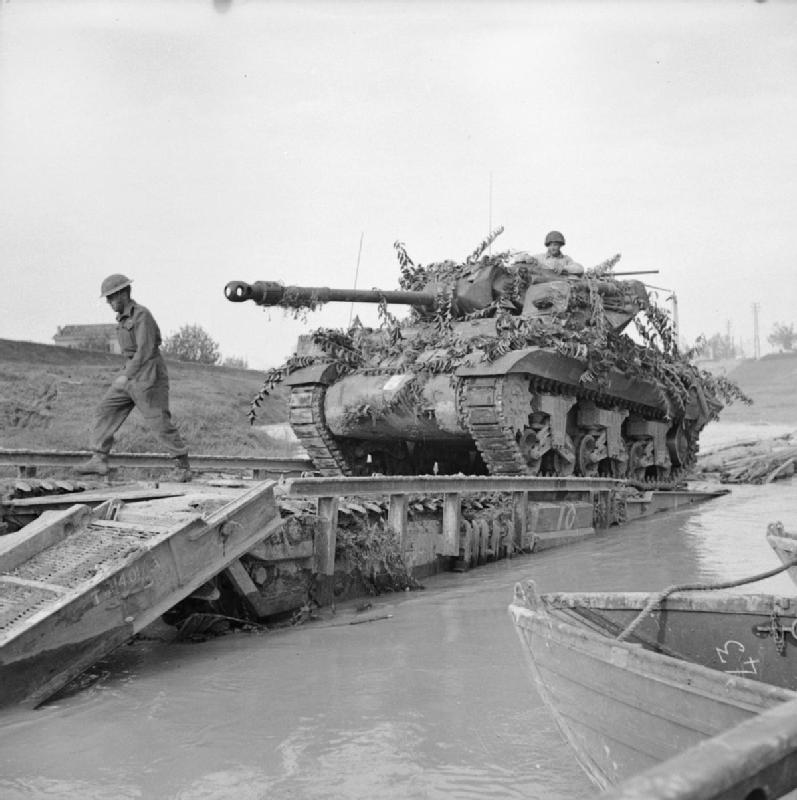
An Achilles 17pdr self-propelled anti-tank gun crossing the River Savio in northern Italy on a Churchill ARK which was driven into the river, 24 October 1944

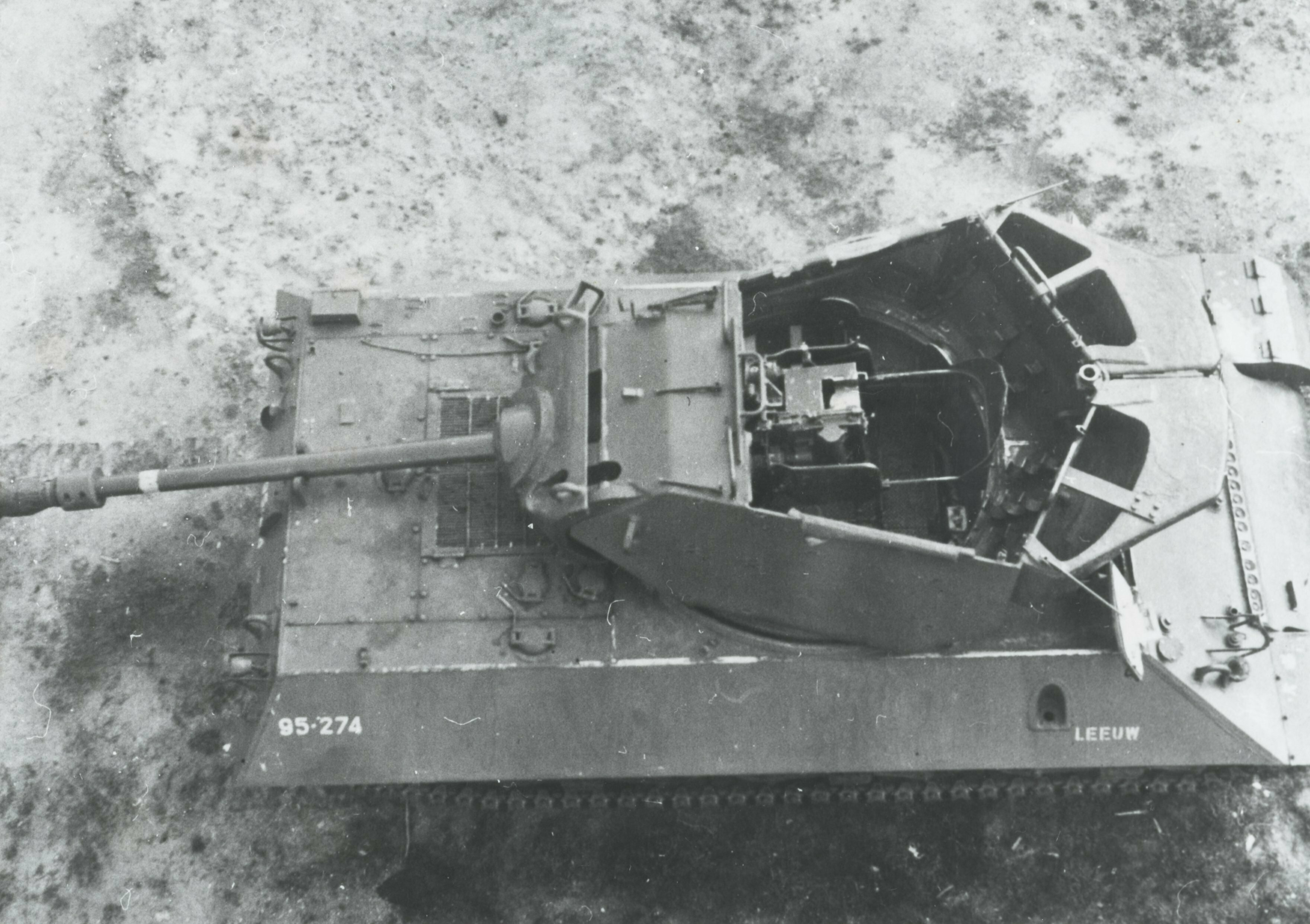
Top-down view of open fighting compartment of the Achilles

The 17 pdr SP Achilles was basically a modified M10, the principal difference being the gun. The main armament of the Achilles was the Ordnance QF 17-pounder, a substantially more powerful gun than the 3 inch (76.2 mm) M7 mounted on the standard M10. The single top-mounted .50 inch (12.7 mm) M2 Browning heavy machine gun was retained.

The 17-pounder mounted on the Achilles was able to penetrate some 140 mm (5.5 in) of armour at 500 m (550 yd) and 131 mm (5.2 in) at 1,000 m (1,100 yd) using standard Armour Piercing, Capped, Ballistic Capped (APCBC) ammunition impacting at a 30-degree angle. When supplied, Armour-piercing discarding sabot (APDS) ammunition could penetrate 209 mm (8 inches) of armour at 500 m and 192 mm (7.6 in) at 1,000 m at a 30-degree angle, though the accuracy of the APDS round was poor during the war. In comparison, the M7 gun on the standard M10 using APCBC ammunition would penetrate 98 mm (3.9 in) of armour at 500 m at a 30-degree angle, and 88 mm of armour at 1,000 m at a 30-degree angle. Only with High-Velocity Armour Piercing (HVAP) ammunition did that gun compare with the 17-pounder, the ammunition being able to penetrate 140 mm (5.5 in) at 500 m at a 30-degree angle, and 127 mm (5.0 in) at 1,000 m at a 30-degree angle. However, 3-inch HVAP ammunition was in very short supply, whereas the standard 17-pounder ammunition was available in huge quantities for the British.

The 17-pounder required a counterweight fitted behind the muzzle brake on its long barrel. This gave the Achilles a distinctive appearance compared to the comparatively short-barrelled, brakeless, entirely straight barrel of the M10. Once the Germans discovered the effectiveness of the Achilles' gun on the same M10 carriage compared to the much less powerful M7 gun, attempts were made to disguise the 17-pounder by painting its brake and counterweight.

Two other material changes were made to the Achilles: the addition of 17 mm (0.67 in) thick armour plates welded to the front and sides of the M10 to increase armour protection, and the M10's open turret was fitted with a 20 mm thick shield to provide protection from overhead threats.

== Production ==
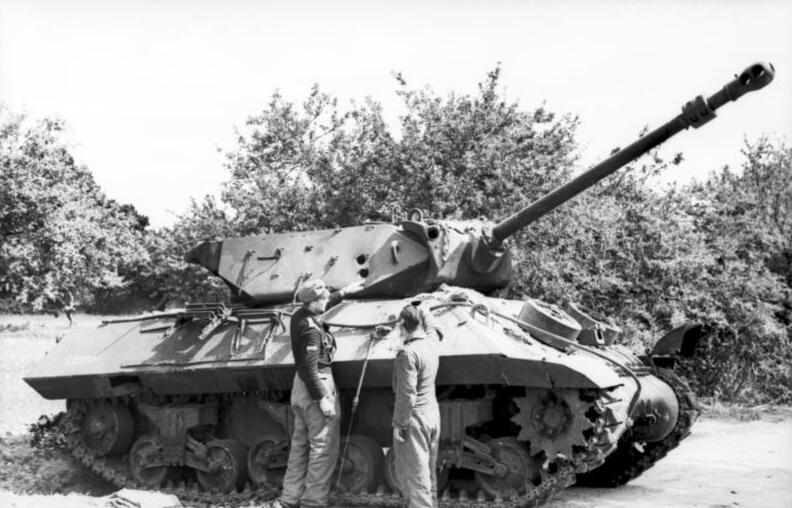
German personnel examine an Achilles of 245 Battery, 62nd Regiment, Royal Artillery, knocked out with three penetrating hits to its turret in Normandy, 1944

The desire to mount the 17-pounder on the M10 was governed by the degree of difficulty involved in mounting the 17-pounder on the tank itself. Luckily for the British, the initial batches of M10s had an easily modified gun mounting to facilitate the future replacement of the older 3-inch M7 gun with the newer 76 mm gun M1. This gun mounting design allowed the British to replace the 3-inch gun with the 17-pounder gun. The British took delivery of some 845 vehicles in 1943, but of the second version of the M10, only the T71 mark designed to carry the M1 gun could carry the 17-pounder.

The British had planned to convert 1,000 M10s into 17pdr armed variants for Normandy, but for some reason conversions were not started until April 1944. By 6 June 1944, only 124 M10s had been converted; however, the number of conversions post D-day increased and by the end of the year 816 M10s had been converted, 152 vehicles in November alone. However, the low numbers at the start of the invasion of Normandy meant that many British units went ashore with the standard M10s and that losses in Achilles-equipped units were often replaced by standard 3-inch armed M10s.

As a self-propelled anti-tank gun, both Achilles and standard M10s were distributed to and operated by the regiments of the Royal Artillery. Around 1,650 M10s were received by the British during the war, with 1,100 converted to the 17-pdr by its end.

== Operational use ==
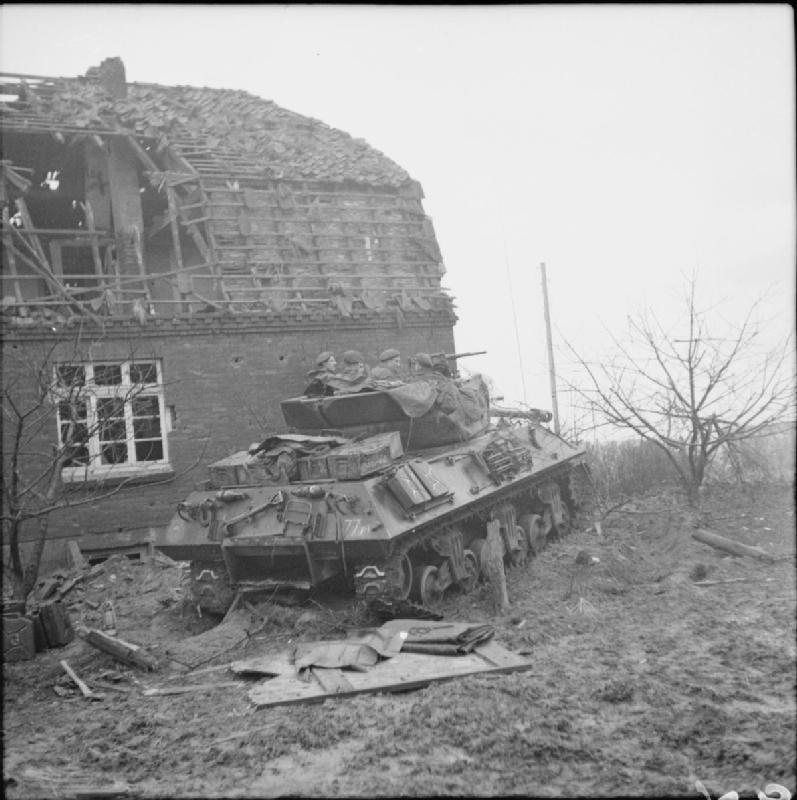
An Achilles 17-pdr tank destroyer uses a building as cover in Hassum, near Goch in Germany, 20 February 1945

The standard anti-tank gun used in infantry units in the British Army was the QF 6-pounder gun a small, light gun able to defeat the more common German Panzer IV and Sturmgeschütz with regular ammunition but not the heavier Panthers and Tigers front on. The next generation British anti-tank gun, the 17-pounder, was able to deal with Tigers and Panthers but had a far longer emplacement time prior to battle than the 6-pounder due to its larger size, often taking a day to fully prepare for action.

As a result, the British used the Achilles as a quickly deployable anti-tank gun, able to reinforce a position taken by infantry and engage counter-attacking German forces while the slower towed 17-pounders were pulled up and dug in for a more long-term defensive presence. This had the advantage of mitigating the weak armour protection of the Achilles, as being used defensively usually allowed it to fire the vital first shot. This was in line with the original design concept of the vehicle, intended to blunt German "blitzkrieg" attack tactics. The M10/Achilles turret had an extremely slow manual-only turret rotation, a limited tactical disadvantage when the tank was used only in a defensive role. As such, they had an advantage over the German Sturmgeschütz, which had a gun in limited traverse casemate. However, the Sturmgeschütz's low profile and heavy armour were significant assets that allowed it to be successful in its different tactical environment. Usually, the only time the British used the M10 and Achilles offensively was in support of Churchill tank units, which lacked the associated 17 pdr-armed tanks (Sherman Firefly) that Sherman and Cromwell tank units had.

Achilles went ashore on D-Day, equipping units of the Royal Artillery and Royal Canadian Artillery in Armoured Division or Corps Anti-tank (A/Tk) Regiments . A typical A/Tk Regiment would have 4 batteries, 2 x towed 17 pdr Batteries, 1 x Achilles and 1 x M10 Battery. The M10 Battery was replaced by a second Achilles Battery as more vehicles became available. Perhaps the most successful action of the Achilles was conducted by B troop, 245th Battery, 62nd Anti-Tank Regiment, Royal Artillery attached to the Canadian Royal Hamilton Light Infantry during Operation Charnwood to take the city of Caen. South of Buron, a counterattack by a mixed force of Panzer IV and Panther tanks of the 12th SS Panzer Regiment was defeated by Achilles and 17-pounder anti tank guns of 245th Battery, 62nd Anti-tank Regiment. Thirteen German tanks were destroyed in one of the most successful anti-tank engagements of the campaign, for the loss of four self-propelled guns and a further four damaged.

== Post-war usage ==
After World War II, Canada rebuilt M10 tank destroyers at the Montreal Locomotive Works and gave 48 M10s to Denmark and the Netherlands in 1955. They were used in local defense until 1989.

== Korean War ==
The M10 was also used in the Korean War until 1951 they were replaced by the Centurion tank.

== Surviving examples ==
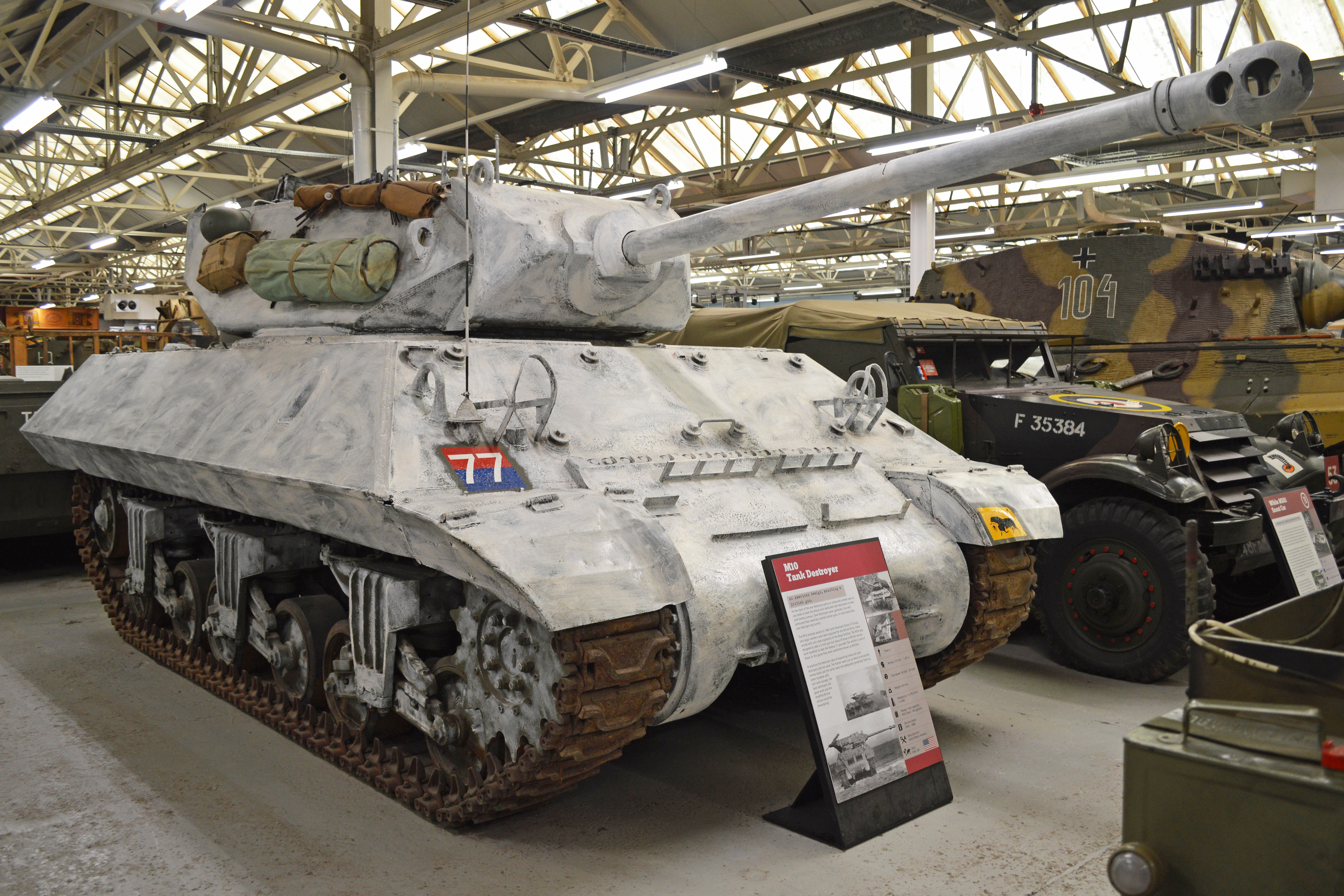
17pdr SP Achilles on display at The Tank Museum, Bovington UK

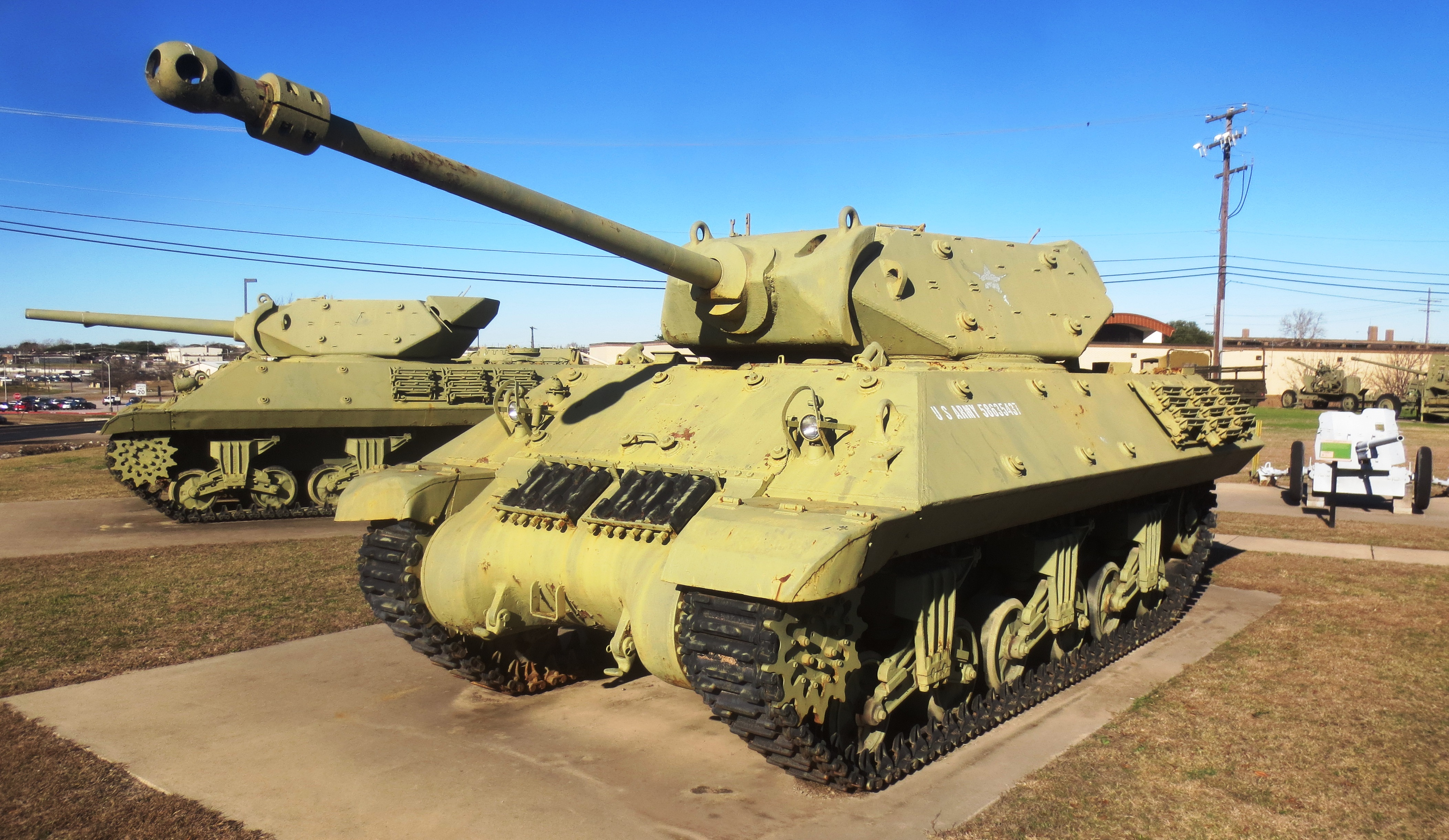
At the 3rd Cavalry Museum, Fort Cavazos, Texas

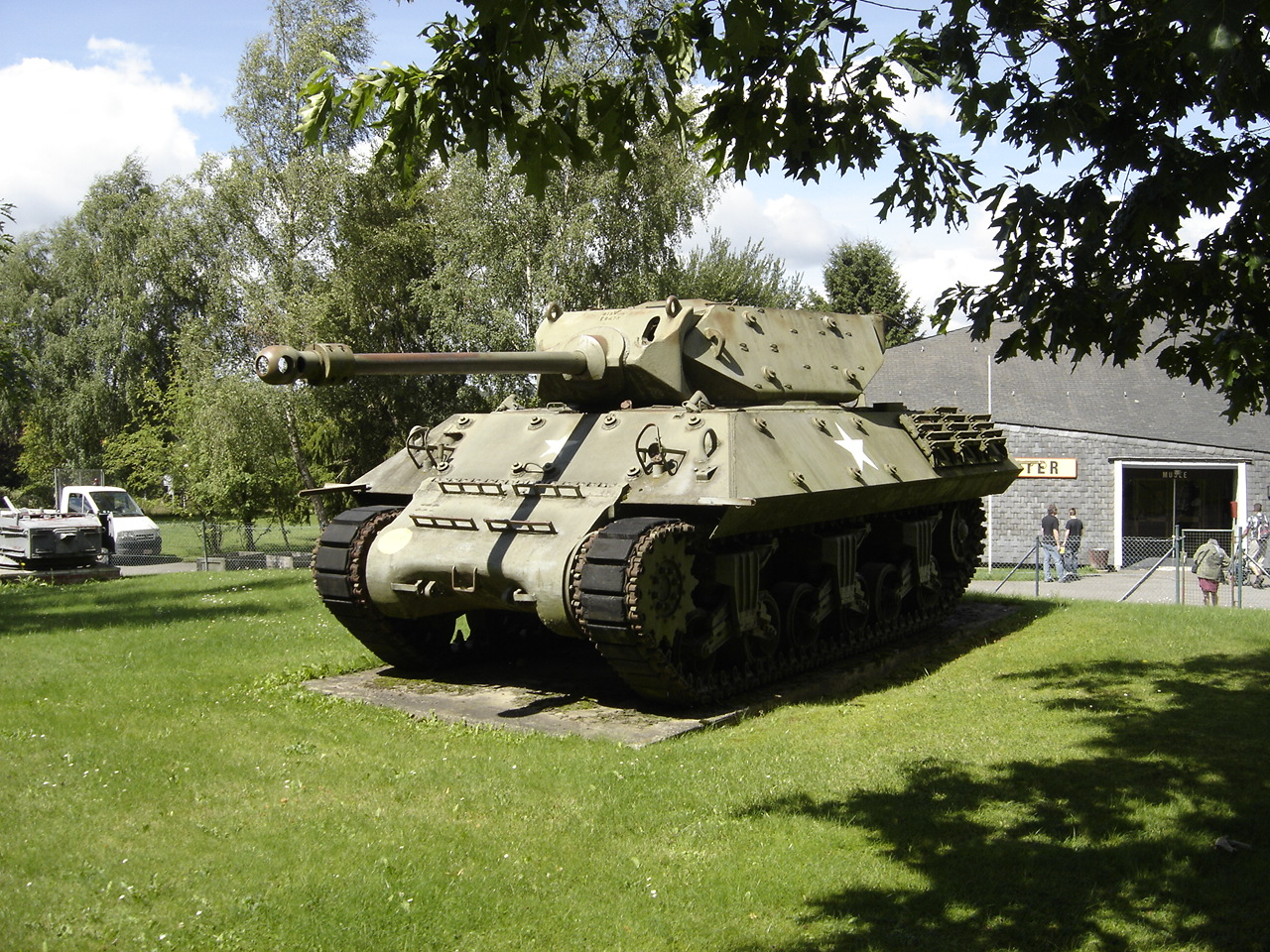
Displayed outside the Bastogne War Museum in Belgium

== See also ==
- Archer (tank destroyer) - a 17-pounder gun in a fixed position on a Valentine tank chassis.
- M36 tank destroyer - an American 90 mm gun upgrade of the M10

== Bibliography ==
- Buckley, John (2004). British Armour in the Normandy Campaign 1944. Routledge. ISBN 0-7146-5323-3.
- Copp, Terry (2003). Fields of Fire: The Canadians in Normandy. Toronto: University of Toronto Press. ISBN 978-0-8020-3780-0. OCLC 56329119.
- Henry, Chris (2004). British Anti-tank Artillery 1939-45. New Vanguard 98. illustrated by Brian Delf. Osprey Publishing. ISBN 9781841766386.
