= Ordnance QF 17-pounder =

Anti-tank gun and tank gun

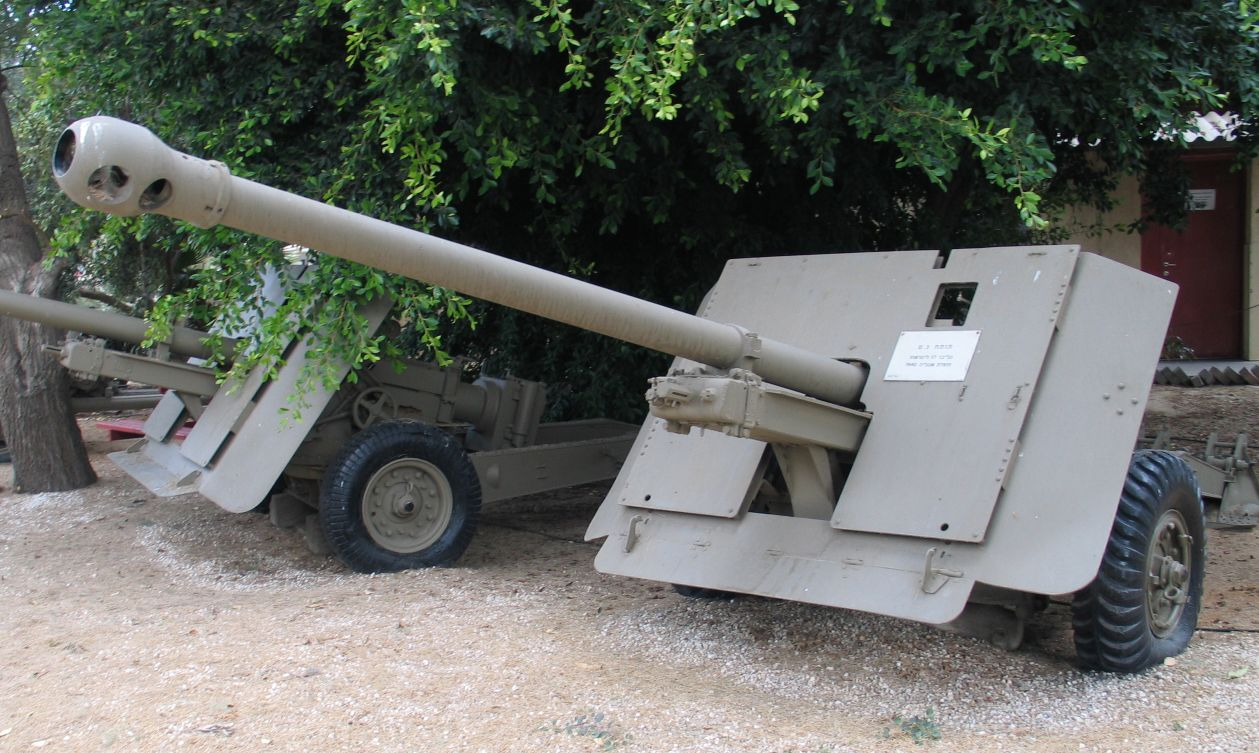
- 17-pounder in Batey ha-Osef museum, Israel
- Type: Anti-tank gun; Tank gun
- Place of origin: United Kingdom

Service history
- In service: 1943–present
- Used by: British Commonwealth
- Wars: World War II; Korean War; Bizerte crisis

Production history
- Designed: 1941–42
- Produced: 1942-

Specifications
- Mass: 2,100 kilograms (4,630 lb) (field gun total); 826 kilograms (1,821 lb) (gun with breech)
- Barrel length: 13 ft 9 in (4.19 m); 55 calibres
- Width: 2.2 m (7 ft 3 in)
- Height: 1.6 m (5 ft 3 in)
- Crew: 5-6
- Shell: Fixed QF 76.2×583mmR (R/135mm)
- Calibre: 3 inches (76.2 mm)
- Breech: Vertical sliding breech
- Recoil: Hydro-pneumatic
- Carriage: Split trail carriage, with gun shield.
- Elevation: -6° to +16.5°
- Traverse: 60°
- Rate of fire: 20 rpm cyclic; 10 rpm practical
- Muzzle velocity: 2,900 ft/s (880 m/s) APCBC HE; 3,050 ft/s (930 m/s) APCBC; 3,950 ft/s (1,200 m/s) APDS
- Effective firing range: 1.5 km (0.93 mi)
- Maximum firing range: 10.5 km (6.5 mi)

The Ordnance Quick-Firing 17-pounder or just 17-pdr, (Note: Under the British standard ordnance weights and measurements the gun's approximate projectile weight is used to denote different guns of the same calibre. Hence this was a 3-inch gun, of which there were several types in British service, which fired a projectile weighing approximately 17 lb (7.7 kg)) was a 76.2 mm (3 inch) gun developed by the United Kingdom during World War II. Used with the APDS shot, it was capable of defeating all but the thickest armour on German tanks.

As well as being used as an anti-tank gun on its own towed carriage, the 17-pdr was also installed on a number of tanks. In particular, it was used to "up-gun" some foreign-built vehicles in British service, resulting in the Sherman Firefly – which gave British tank units the ability to hold their own against their German counterparts. In the anti-tank role, the 17-pdr was replaced, from the late 1940s, by the 120 mm BAT recoilless rifle. As a tank gun, it was succeeded by the 84 mm 20 pounder.

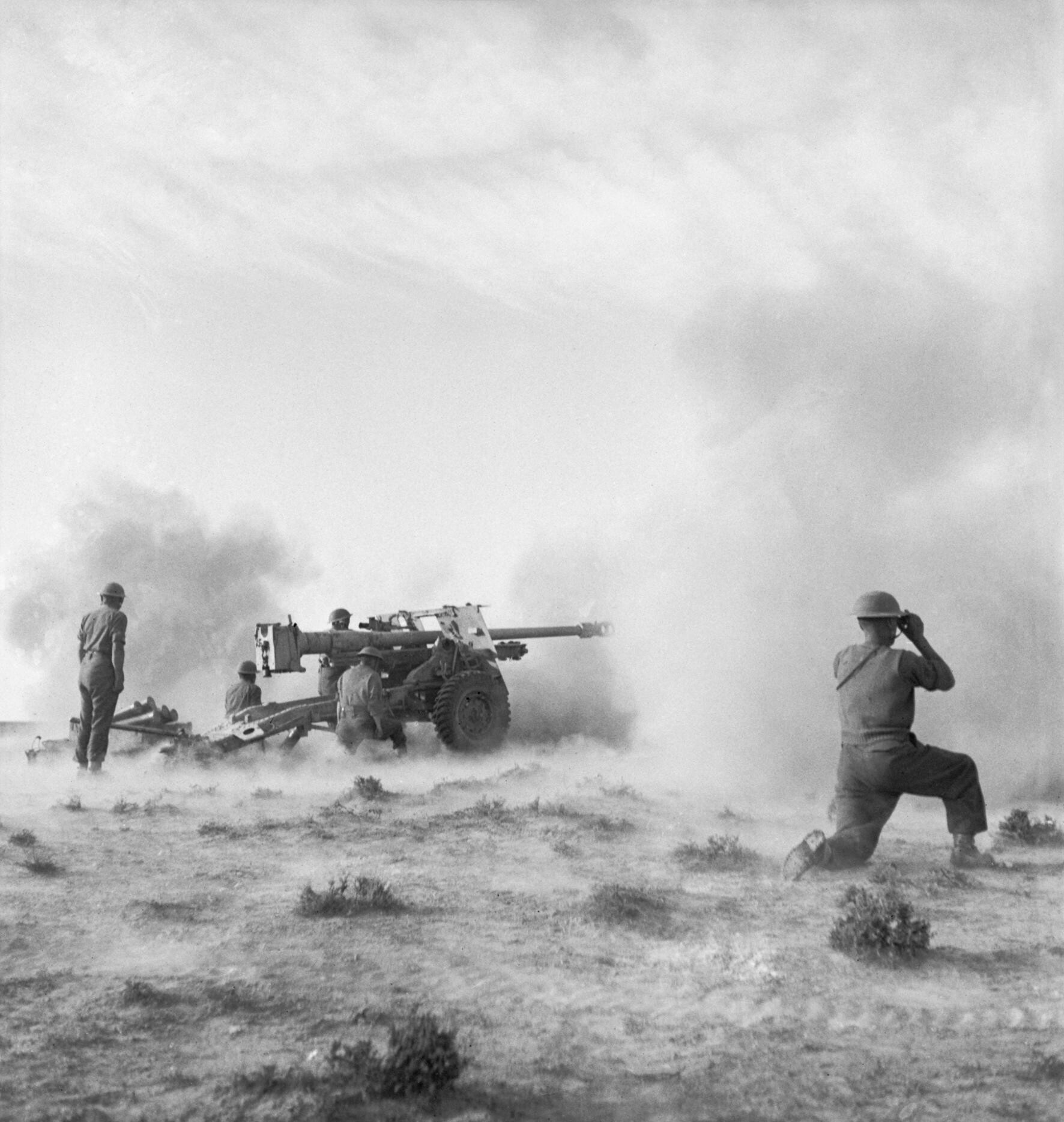
'Pheasant' 17-pdr anti-tank gun in action at the Battle of Medenine, Tunisia, 11 March 1943

== Development history ==
=== Gun development ===
Before the QF 6-pounder had entered service, the British predicted that it would soon be inadequate given the increasing armour of German tanks. In late 1940, the design of a replacement began, and was largely completed by the end of 1941. A prototype production line was set up in spring 1942, and with the appearance of Tiger I tanks in early 1943 in the North African Campaign, the first 100 prototype 17-pounder anti-tank guns were quickly sent to help counter this new threat. So great was the rush that they were sent before proper carriages had been developed, and the guns had to be mounted in the carriages of 25-pounder gun-howitzers. These early weapons were known as 17/25-pounders and given the codename Pheasant. They first saw action in February 1943.

Fully developed 17-pounders started production in 1943 and were first used during the Italian Campaign. They became one of the most effective weapons on the battlefield, on both carriages and tanks.

The 17-pounder anti-tank guns also saw action in Korea against tanks and in general support use against bunkers. After Korea, the gun was largely replaced in the tank role by the 84mm calibre, Ordnance QF 20 pounder, and in the anti-tank role by the 120 mm BAT, MOBAT and L6 WOMBAT series of recoilless rifles.

=== Adaptation into tanks and AFVs ===
The 17-pounder outperformed all other Allied armour-piercing guns, and was quickly adapted for use on various tank chassis. However, few tanks were capable of carrying such a large gun due to the size limitations of their turret rings.

A new British tank specification, A29, was produced to meet the need for a 17-pounder-armed cruiser tank. While the A29 was eventually cancelled without a successful design being produced, an amended specification, A30, reached production in 1943. The new specification reduced weight and enabled the use of Cromwell tank (A27M) components as a design expedient. The resulting Cruiser Mark VIII Challenger (A30) had a longer hull and provided a larger turret, allowing the 17-pounder to be mounted along with space for a second loader, thought to be required for the gun's larger ammunition.

In Australia, plans were made to integrate the 17-pounder with the Australian Cruiser tank series (which combined new hull, turret and powerplant designs to a chassis based on the M3 Lee/Grant). As a result, in 1943, a 17-pdr was successfully fitted to the prototype AC4 tank and test-fired. However, as the tanks already in service with the Australian Army had guns capable of penetrating the lightly-armoured Japanese tanks of the era, full development and production of the AC4 was deemed unnecessary.

The British Army also mounted the 17-pounder on US-supplied M4 Sherman tanks, resulting in the Sherman Firefly – a project that paralleled the Challenger. The Firefly was applied in sufficient numbers to be put into service on D-Day. The Firefly's gun was a specially-modified variant, the Mk IV. A new horizontal-sliding breech was designed as the usual vertical-sliding breech of the Mks I and II made loading very difficult. An additional box was welded to the back of the turret to take the radio, which was moved to allow for the breech and its recoil. (Note: Being a long gun, adequate length inside the turret was needed in order to give a satisfactory balance.) A new recoil mechanism, based on the 6-pounder design, was developed and the thicker section of the gun barrel in contact with the cradle was lengthened to match the new recoil system. The original experimental Sherman mounting at Lulworth was actually rigid with no recoil system. As a result of the success of the Firefly, production of the Challenger was cancelled after only about 200 had been built. Between 2,200 and 2,400 Shermans (Mks I and V – sources vary on the exact numbers of each) were converted as Fireflies and deployed in Sherman regiments in Italy and NW Europe. The Challengers were deployed with Cromwell regiments. While the US Army did request some Fireflies, in March 1945 – and as many as 18 M4s were converted for this order – the war ended before they were shipped from the UK.

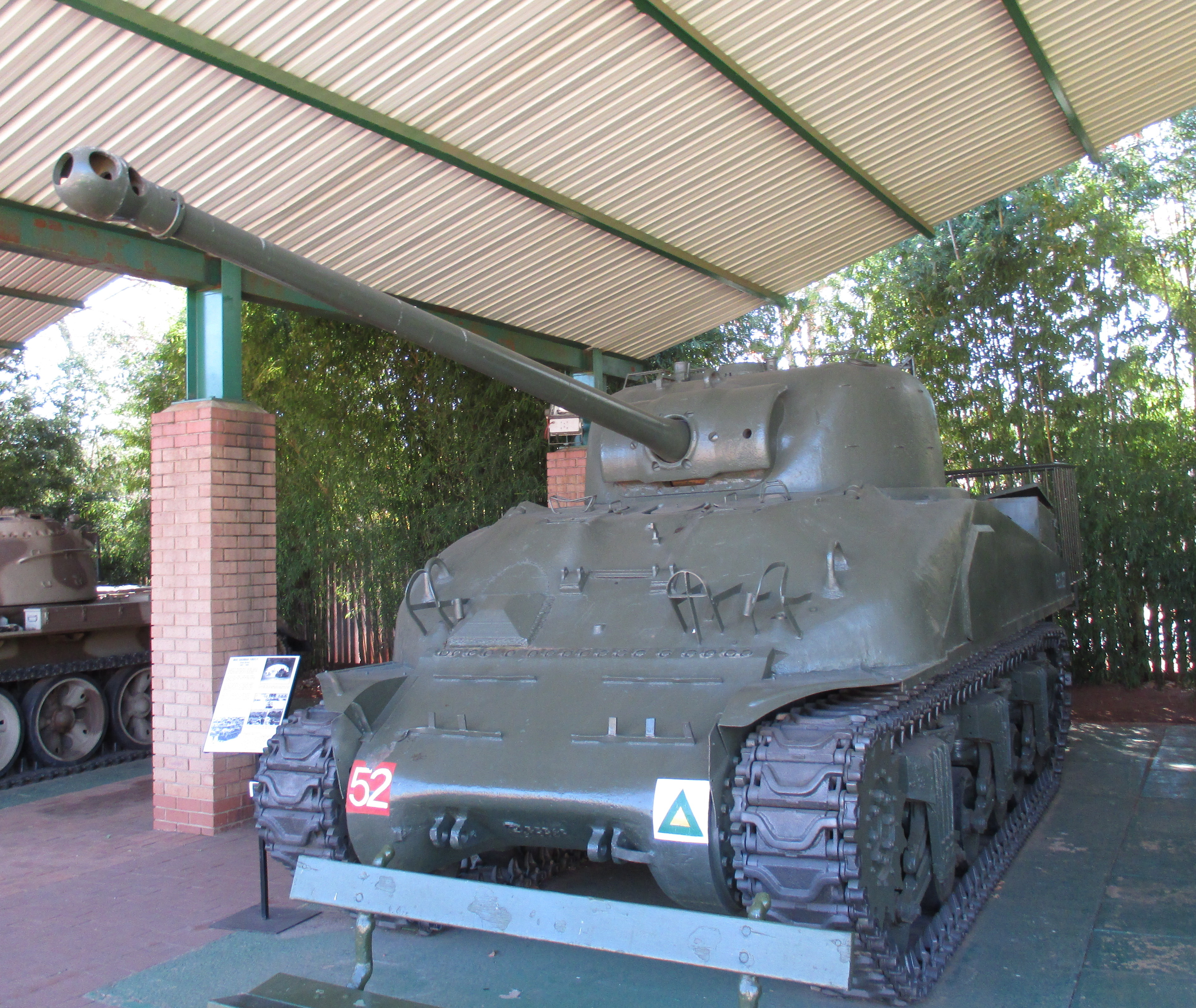
A Sherman Firefly with the 17-pounder, South African National Museum of Military History, 2014

A later variant, the 77 mm HV gun, is often conflated with the 17-pounder per se (as used in the Challenger, Firefly, Achilles and Centurion). The 77 mm HV gun resulted from an intention to fit the 17-pdr on a Cromwell chassis, in a manner more successful than the ungainly Challenger. The projectile of the 17-pdr was mated to the cartridge of the older QF 3-inch 20 cwt anti-aircraft gun, and was fired through a shortened version of the 17-pdr barrel. While the resulting 77 mm HV proved to be a successful anti-tank gun, during the Second World War, it was used only on the Comet (A34) tank.

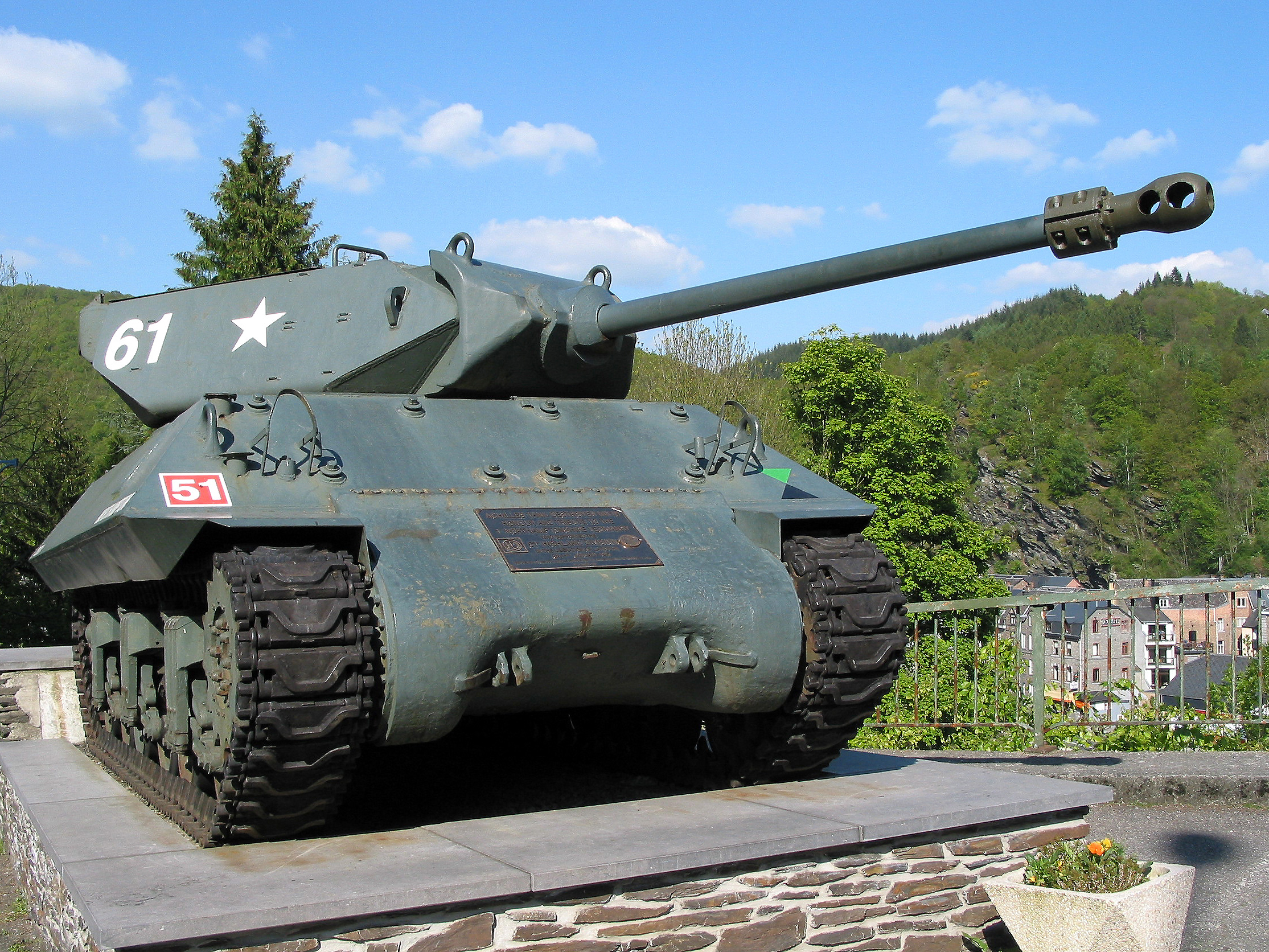
17-pounder SP Achilles of the Battle of the Bulge in La Roche-en-Ardenne.

The British Army also converted some of their US-produced M10 tank destroyers, replacing the US 3-inch (76 mm) M7 gun with the 17-pounder; the resulting vehicles were called 17-pdr SP Achilles or 17-pdr M10C. These served with Royal Artillery as self-propelled guns.

As the war came to a close, the 17-pdr was fitted to the new Centurion tank – the first tank designed, from scratch, around the 17-pdr gun. As a result of the intelligence on the armour of Soviet tanks, in 1949 the 20-pounder replaced the 17-pdr as the main gun of the Centurion.

== Variants ==
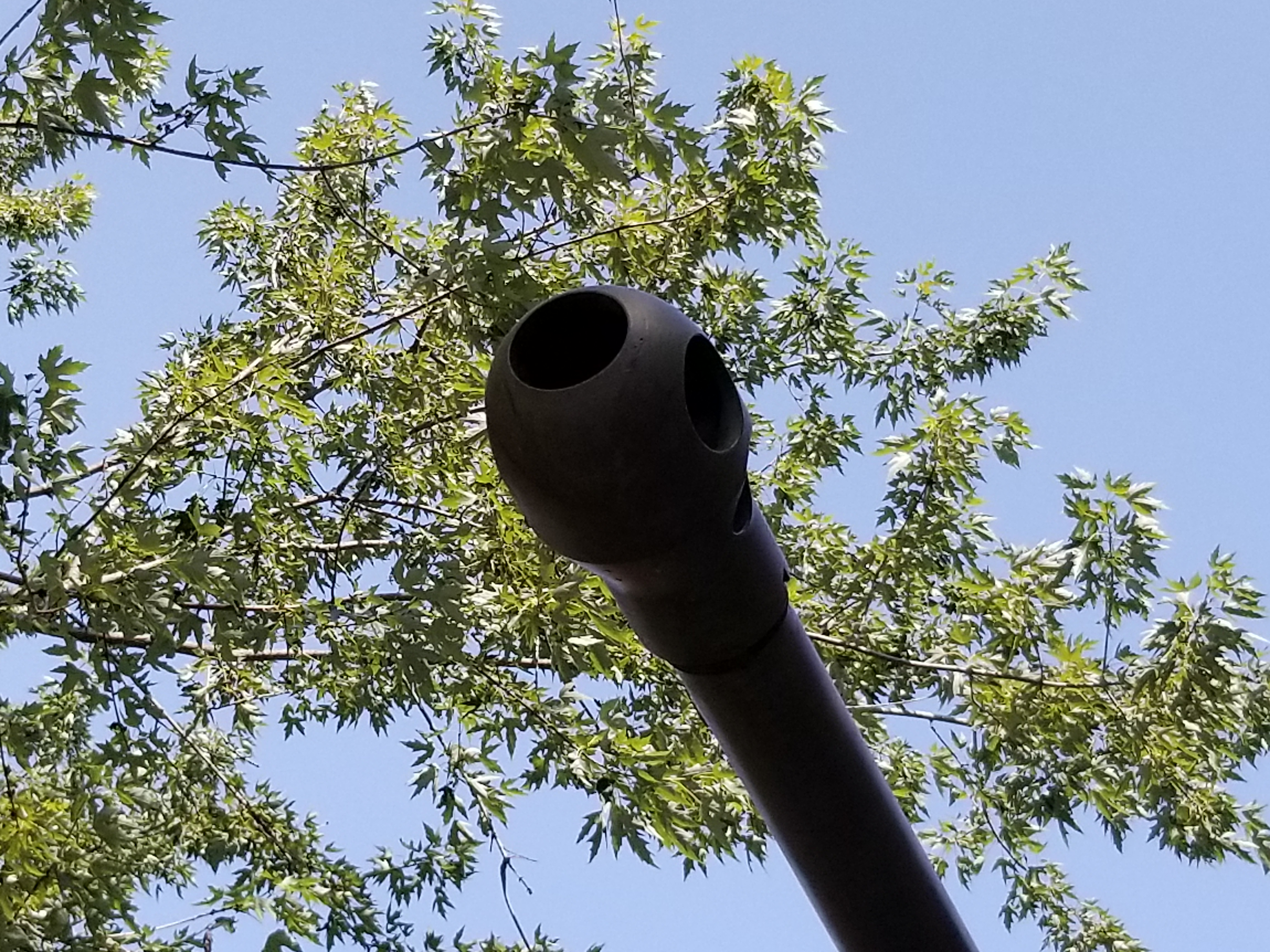
Muzzle brake Ordnance QF 17 pounder

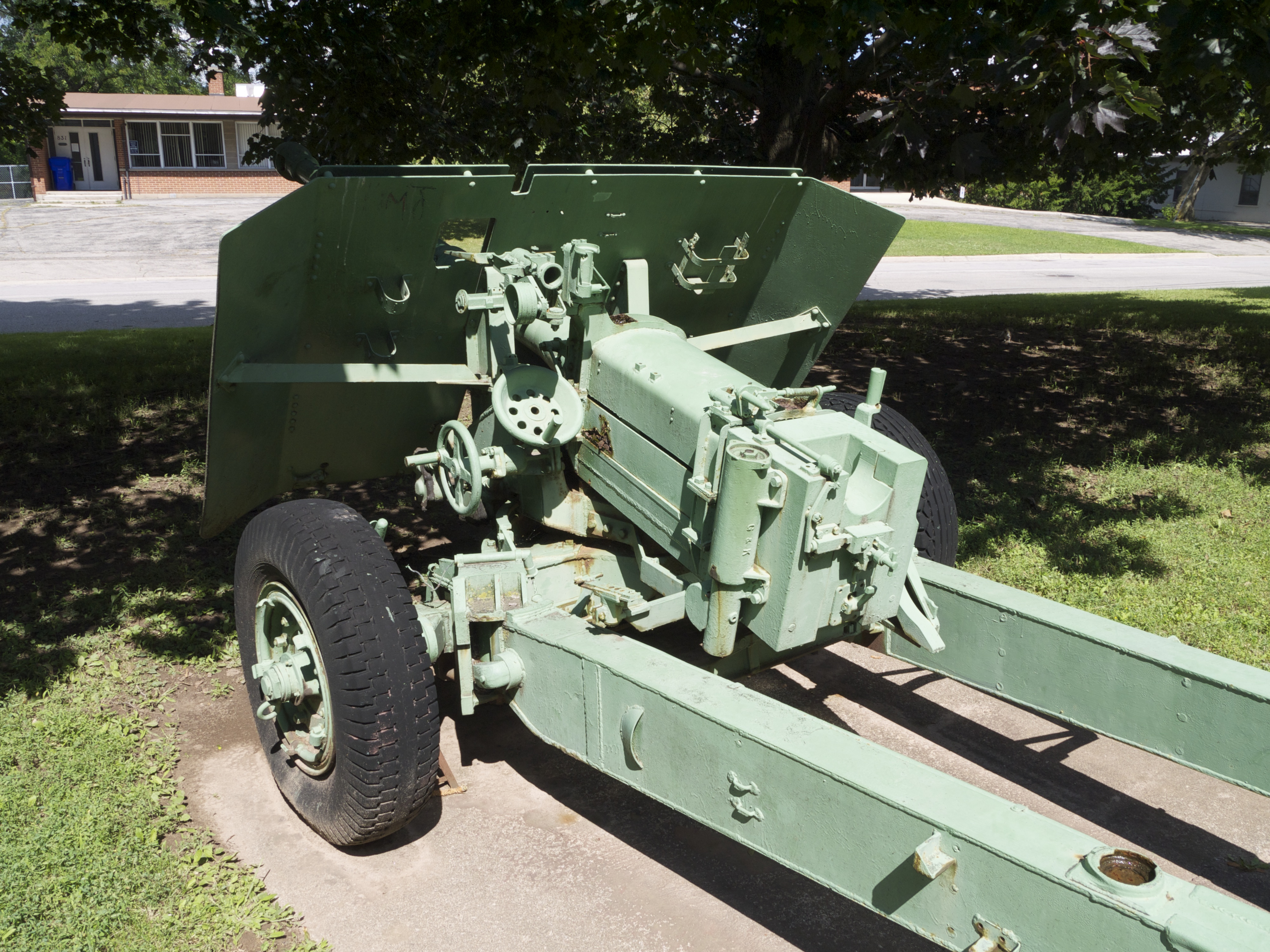
Rear view of QF 17-pounder displayed in Burlington, Ontario

Mark I
first production versions.
Mark II
intended for tank use. Removed the carrier mountings and replaced the muzzle brake with a counterweight. The brake was added back on in March 1944 with the introduction of the APDS shot. The Mk. II was used on the Archer self-propelled anti-tank gun and Cruiser Mark VIII Challenger tank.
Mark III
Royal Navy adaptation for use on landing craft, generally similar to the Mk. I, but included an automatic loading system. Unused.
Mark IV
Another tank adaptation, this time with a different breech where the block slid to the side instead of down to take up less room. Used on Sherman Firefly.
Mark V
A version of the Mk IV with different mounts to allow it to replace the US 3 in (76.2 mm) Gun M7 on the M10 tank destroyer, creating the 17pdr SP Achilles.
Mark VI
Another Mk. IV adaptation with a shortened breech.
Mark VII
Similar to the Mk. VI, yet another change to the breech.
Straussler Conversion
This was an experimental gun, designed by Nicholas Straussler that was fitted with a motorized gun-carriage. A modified ammunition limber would be attached to the gun's trails, making a four-wheeled, self-propelled vehicle and removing the need for a truck to tow the gun.

=== 77 mm HV ===
77 mm HV
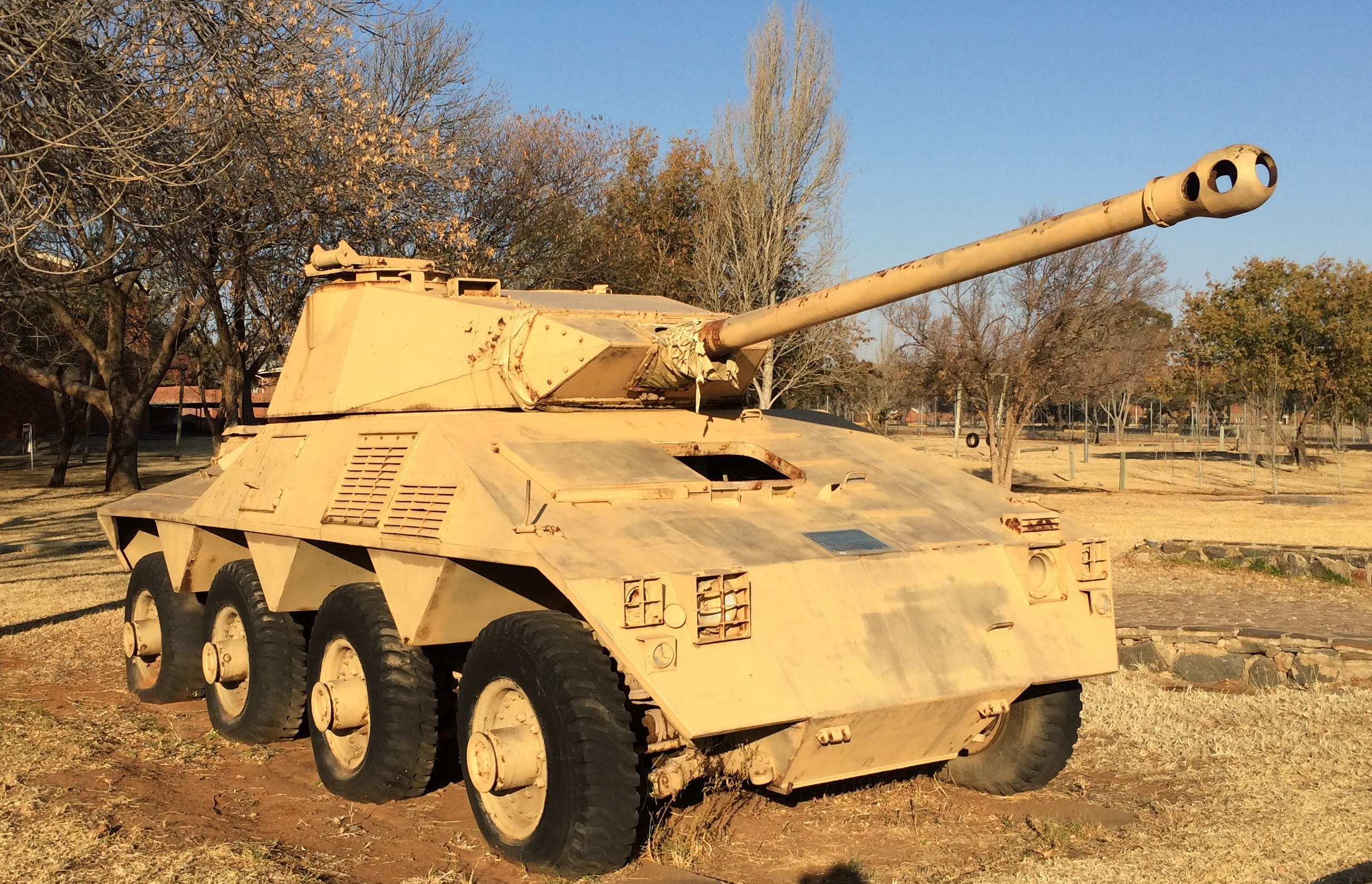
- 77 mm HV Mk2 on a heavily modified Alvis Saracen; this served as a prototype for the later Rooikat armored car
- Type: Tank gun
- Place of origin: United Kingdom

Production history
- Designer: Vickers
- Manufacturer: Vickers

Specifications
- Mass: 1,502 pounds (681 kg)
- Length: 13.8 feet (4.2 m)
- Calibre: Fixed QF 76.2×420mmR
- Elevation: +20/-14 on Comet
- Effective firing range: 2,000 yards (1,800 m)

An intention to improve on the ungainly and heavy Challenger, resulted in the Vickers 77 mm High Velocity. The new name was necessary to prevent confusion over ammunition supplies: although it used the same 76.2 mm calibre projectile as the 17-pounder, the shell and breech were both different.

A precursor had initially mated a 75 mm projectile to a necked-down 3-inch 20 cwt AA gun cartridge, through a modified 3-inch breech. The larger cartridge provided a greater propellant charge compared with other 17-pdr shells. cartridge of the older QF 3-inch 20 cwt anti-aircraft gun.

When the Comet (A34) tank was at the design stage, the 75 mm HV (as it was) was reworked to fire the same projectiles as the 17-pounder through a shortened 17-pounder barrel. This has the benefit of greater ease of use on tanks, many of which would not have sufficient turret space to accommodate the breech length and recoil distance of the 17-pounder. Similarly, the smaller 3"-based ammunition was easier to store and handle in the tank's cramped interior. This new gun's ammunition was not interchangeable with the 17-pounder.

== Ammunition ==
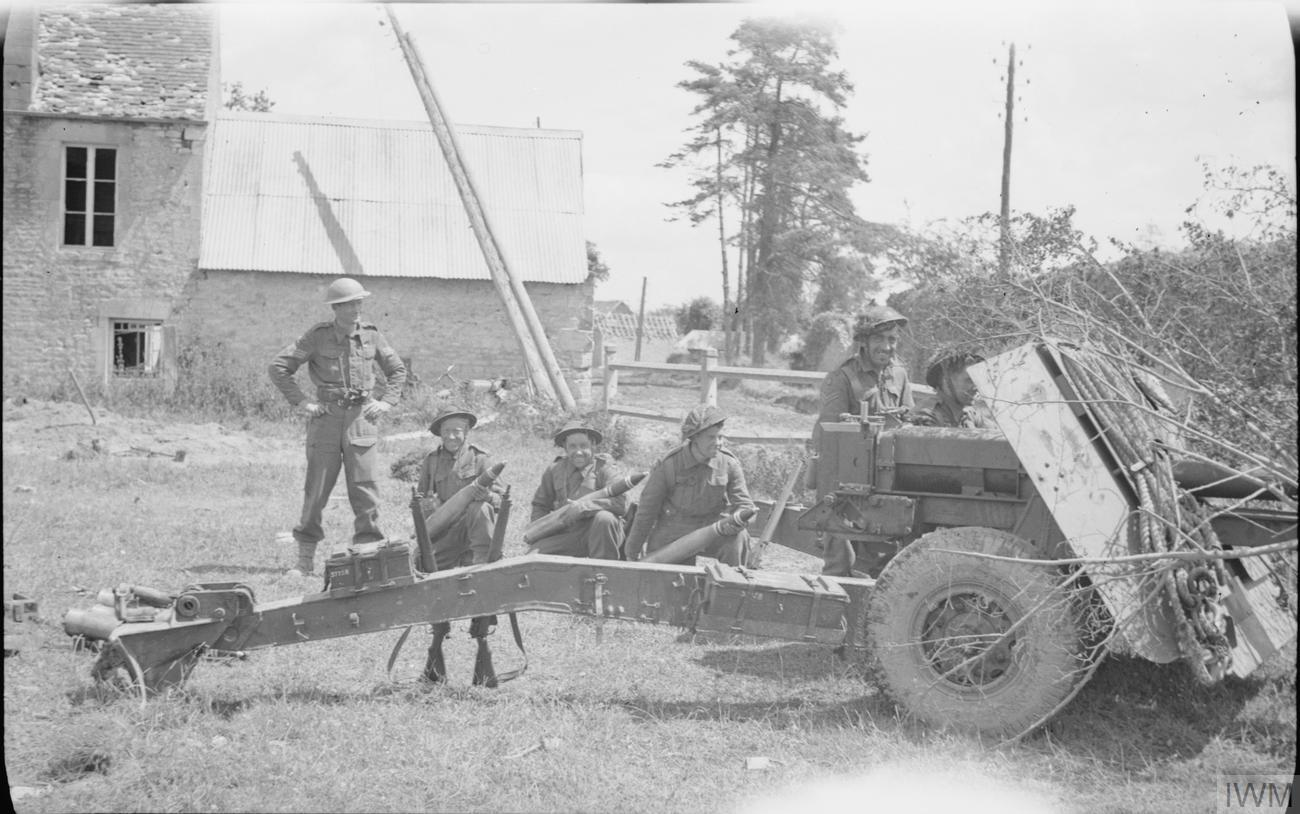
17-pounder gun, three loaders standing by with AP ammunition during Operation Epsom, 27 June 1944.

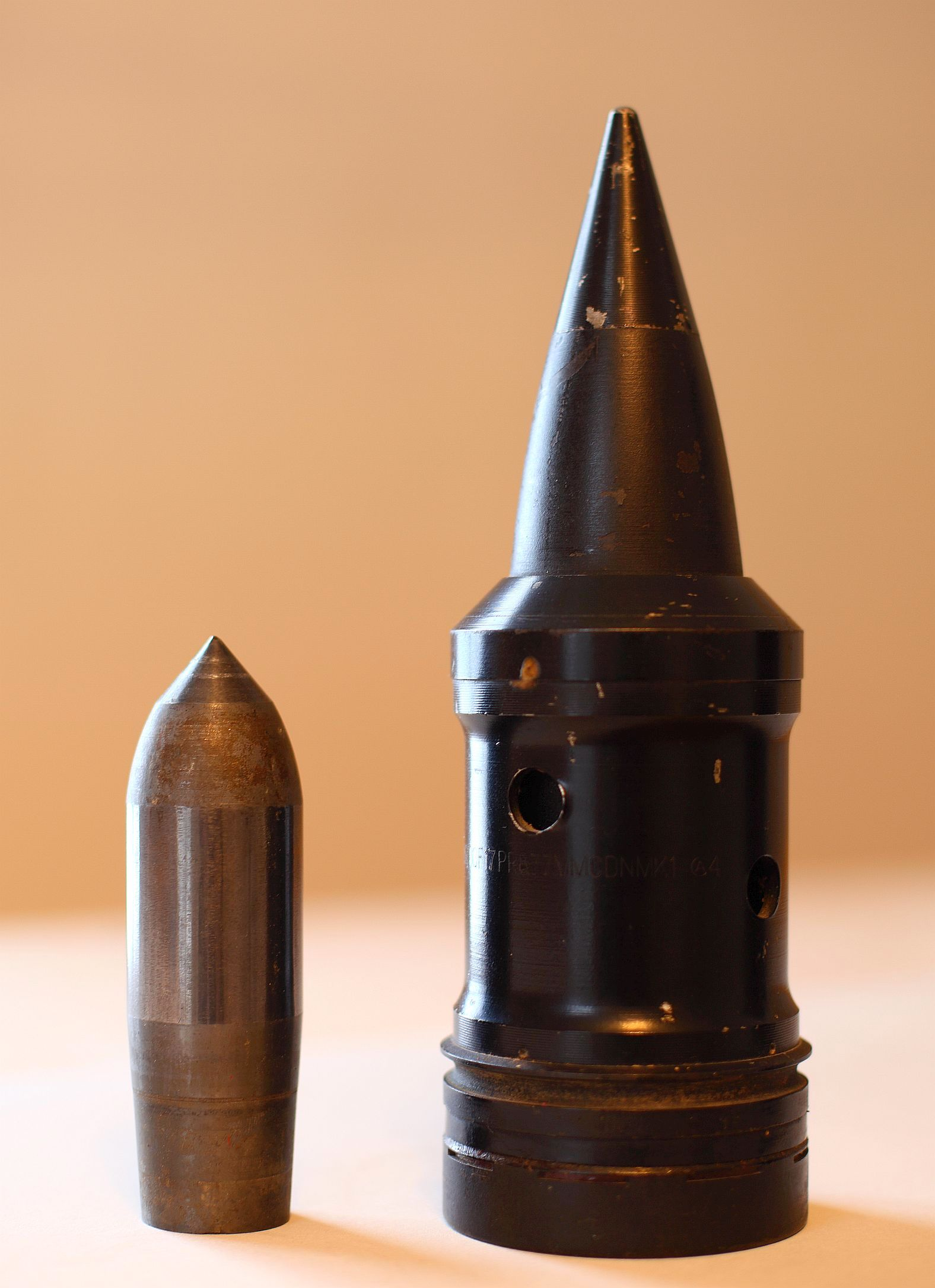
complete 17pdr Armour-Piercing Discarding-Sabot (APDS) shot (right) and tungsten carbide core (left) side by side

The 17-pounder used the following ammunition types:

Armour Piercing Capped (APC)
Armour Piercing Capped was a basic AP shell used with field guns, but was not used when the 17pdr was mounted in the Sherman Firefly tank.
Armour Piercing, Capped, Ballistic Capped (APCBC)
Armour Piercing, Capped, Ballistic Capped ammunition could penetrate 163 mm of armour at 500 metres and 150 mm at 1000 m.
Armour-piercing discarding sabot (APDS)
Armour-piercing discarding sabot could penetrate 256 mm of armour at 500 m and 233 mm at 1000 m, (Note: A Bovington Tank Museum document states the 17-Pounder Mk II firing APDS could penetrate 187 mm at 500 yards with a 30° angle of obliquity, while Jane's Armour and Artillery 1981-82 gives a penetration of 231 mm at 1,000 yards with the same strike angle.) and allowing it in theory to penetrate the armour of even the German Tiger II heavy tank. Most sources are in agreement that APDS was not available on D-Day itself, but reached Normandy in increasing amounts by the end of June or early July 1944. It was available for the breakout battle from Normandy and the advance to the Netherlands and Germany. The weight of the enclosed shot, excluding the enclosing sabot, was 7.7 lb (3.5 kg).There were accuracy issues using APDS caused by the muzzle brake aperture being too small to allow a clean separation of the sabot. Teams of engineers visited tank and artillery regiments, with equipment to bore the aperture slightly. New guns were modified in the factory.
High Explosive (HE)
The HE shells for the 17-pounder had smaller bursting charges (Mk 1: 1.28 lbs, Mk 2: 1.06 lbs) than those for the 75mm gun used by the Sherman (M48: 1.47 lbs, Mk 1: 1.64 lbs).
Practice, Shot Mk 10
"The components of this practice round are similar to those of Shot APCBC, except for the projectile. The projectile is made of cast iron and is uncapped. It is fitted with tracer."

APCBC ammunition was the standard ammunition for the gun, while APDS shot was used for about 6% of the average load of a 17-pounder-equipped British tank.

While offering greater penetration, the smaller (sub-calibre) tungsten core of APDS was considered to provide less accurate fire than APCBC ammunition at ranges beyond 500 yards. This was due to the much lesser visible impact of rounds that fell short, making it hard to spot the fall of shot and correct aim. The APDS was also considered to cause less damage to an enemy tank if it did penetrate the armour. After penetration, the core usually disintegrated.

The 17-pounder produced a very large muzzle flash due to the large amount of propellant in its cartridges. Muzzle blast was also significant, described by crews of the anti-tank gun variant as resembling a hard slap on the chest.

Ammunition type
	APCBC	APDS	HE/Red	HE/HC reduced	HE/Super/HC reduced	Smoke screening	Smoke coloured
Length complete round	34.475 in (875.7 mm)	29.925 in (760.1 mm)	31.655 in (804.0 mm)	34.51 in (877 mm)	34.17 in (868 mm)		
Weight complete round	37 lb 9 oz (17.0 kg)	24 lb 12 oz (11.2 kg)	26 lb 5 oz (11.9 kg)	28 lb 5 oz (12.8 kg)	28 lb 5 oz (12.8 kg)		
Projectile mark	1 and 3	1B and 2	2	1	1		
Weight projectile	17 lb 0 oz (7.7 kg)	7 lb 11 oz (3.5 kg)	13 lb 6 oz (6.1 kg)	14 lb 10 oz (6.6 kg)	14 lb 10 oz (6.6 kg)	18 lb 10 oz (8.4 kg)	17 lb 5 oz (7.9 kg)
Projectile fuze action	-	-	Percussion direct action (DA)	Super quick (SQ) or delay	Percussion	Time	Time
Projectile filling	-	-	TNT	TNT	TNT	-	-
Bursting charge including exploder	-	-	1 lb 1 oz (0.48 kg)	1 lb 4.5 oz (0.58 kg)	1 lb 4.5 oz (0.58 kg)	-	-
Propellent type	Nitrocellulose NH035	Nitrocellulose NH033	Cordite WM017	Cordite WM017	Cordite WM017	Cordite WMT	Cordite WMT
Weight propellent	8 lb 2 oz (3.7 kg)	6 lb 12 oz (3.1 kg)	1 lb 10 oz (0.74 kg)	1 lb 10.25 oz (0.744 kg)	1 lb 10.25 oz (0.744 kg)	0 lb 6.875 oz (0.1949 kg)	0 lb 6.875 oz (0.1949 kg)
Muzzle velocity	2,950 ft/s (900 m/s)	3,950 ft/s (1,200 m/s)	1,800 ft/s (550 m/s)			750 ft/s (230 m/s)	750 ft/s (230 m/s)
EFC full charge	0.5	0.75	0.25	0.25	0.25	negligible	negligible
EFC reduced charge	0.03	-	0.03	0.03	0.03	-	-

NH = non-hygroscopic; i.e. does not absorb moisture.

HC = High capacity.

EFC = Equivalent full charge. EFC was the basis of calculating the wear effect of propellent charges. Instructions were to examine the barrel for wear after every 40 EFC.

== Performance ==
Calculated penetration figures (90 degrees)
Gun type	Ammunition type	Muzzle velocity (m/s)	Penetration (mm)										
Gun type	Ammunition type	Muzzle velocity (m/s)	100 m	250 m	500 m	750 m	1000 m	1250 m	1500 m	1750 m	2000 m	2500 m	3000 m
QF 77 mm	APCBC	785 m/s (2,580 ft/s)	147	143	137	131	126	121	116	111	106	98	90
QF 77 mm	APCBC FH	785 m/s (2,580 ft/s)	157	153	147	141	135	130	124	119	114	105	96
QF 17 pdr	AP	884 m/s (2,900 ft/s)	200	190	175	160	147	135	124	114	105	88	74
QF 17 pdr	AP FH	884 m/s (2,900 ft/s)	164	156	144	132	121	112	103	94	87	73	62
QF 17 pdr	APCBC	884 m/s (2,900 ft/s)	174	170	163	156	150	143	137	132	126	116	107
QF 17 pdr	APCBC FH	884 m/s (2,900 ft/s)	187	182	175	167	161	154	148	141	136	125	115
QF 17 pdr	APDS	1,204 m/s (3,950 ft/s)	275	268	256	244	233	223	213	204	194	178	162

- FH marks the performance against face hardened armour (FHA), as opposed to rolled homogeneous armour (RHA).

== Use ==
=== Anti-tank gun ===
The 17-pounder was a much bulkier and heavier weapon than its predecessor. As a result, it had to be towed by a gun tractor, such as the Morris Quad, M3 Half-track or the Crusader, as it could not effectively be moved by its gun crew alone, especially on poor ground. After firing on soft ground, the 17-pounder frequently had to be pulled out of the ground due to the gun recoil burying the trail spades. After the Second World War, it was issued to anti-tank units of the Royal Artillery in the British Army of the Rhine (BAOR) towed by the M3 Half Track. When the Royal Artillery anti-tank units were disbanded in 1951, it was transferred to Infantry battalions in the BAOR (six per battalion), towed by the Oxford Tracked Carrier. It was later replaced by the 120 mm BAT recoilless rifle anti-tank weapon.

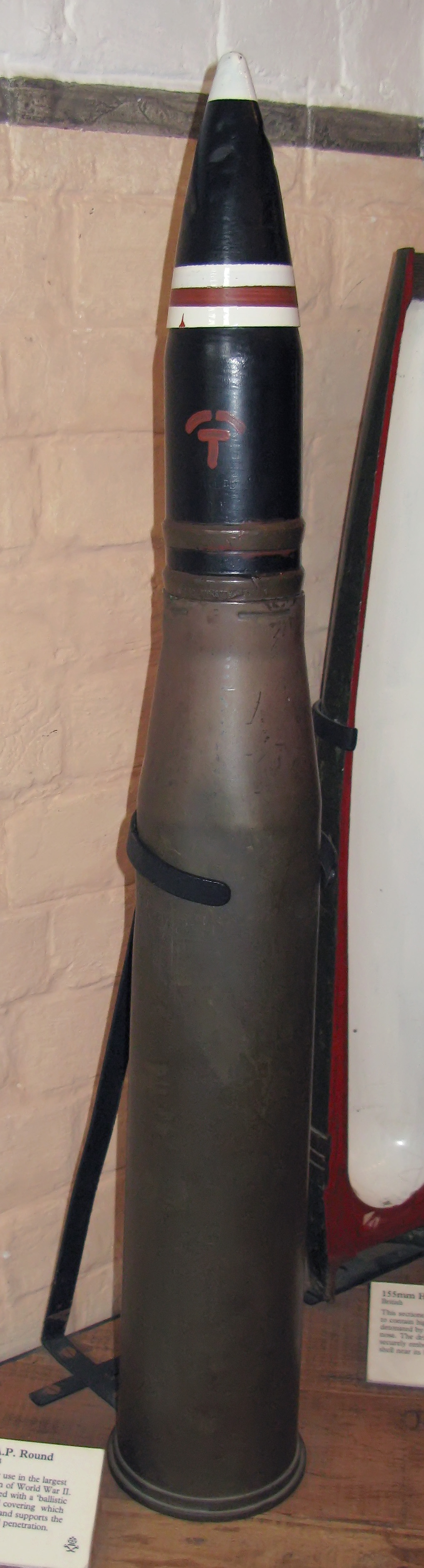
The complete AP round of a 17-pounder

==== Pheasant carriage ====
Also known by the 17/25 pounder designation, a stop-gap measure named Pheasant mated the 17 pounder gun with a modified 25 pounder carriage. This enabled the gun to be pressed into service before its own carriage design was ready.

==== Split trail carriage ====
A custom designed carriage for the 17 pounder comprising:

- Split trail carriage, with gunshield.
- Weight: 3 t.
- Elevation: −6° to +16.5°
- Traverse: 60°

=== Middle East ===
In the immediate post-war era in the Middle East, Arab national armies - Transjordan, Egypt, Syria and Iraq - mainly used British manufactured artillery, including the towed 17-pounder. The Israelis used a number of 17 pounders that they captured from the Arabs in the war of independence

=== Vehicle mount ===
==== World War II ====
- Tank, Cruiser, Challenger (A30) - 200 built
- Tank, Cruiser, Comet I (A34) (77 mm OQF HV) - 1,200 by end of war.
- SP 17-pounder, Valentine, Mk I, Archer self-propelled anti-tank gun built on Valentine tank hull, 655 built
- Sherman Firefly - Modified Sherman tank (Medium Tank M4), about 2,000
- 17pdr SP Achilles - Modified 3-inch Gun Motor Carriage M10, about 1,100 by end of war
- Tank, Infantry, Black Prince (A43) (experimental development of Churchill tank, never fielded)
- Australian Cruiser tank Mk IV (prototype turret only, never fielded)

==== Post-war ====
- Ratel IFV Concept 1 - a heavily modified South African test-bed chassis.
- Eland Mk7 Concept 2 - a heavily modified South African test-bed chassis.
- Alvis Saracen Concept 3 - a heavily modified South African test-bed chassis.
- Centurion - on A41 prototype and on production Centurion Mk 1 and Mk 2.
- SP 17-pounder, A30 (Avenger) - variant of Challenger, not available in time for war, 250 built

== See also ==
=== Weapons of comparable role, performance and era ===
- 7.5 cm Pak 40 German anti-tank gun (similar form factor as Anti-Tank gun)
- 7.5 cm KwK 42 German tank gun (similar ballistic performance)
- 90mm gun M1/M2/M3 (similar ballistic performance)
- 76 mm gun M1 US tank gun
- 85 mm D-5T Soviet tank gun
- 75 mm Reșița Model 1943 Romanian anti-tank gun
- Ordnance QF 20-pounder
