= Archer (tank destroyer) =

British self-propelled anti-tank gun

SP 17pdr, Valentine, Mk I, Archer
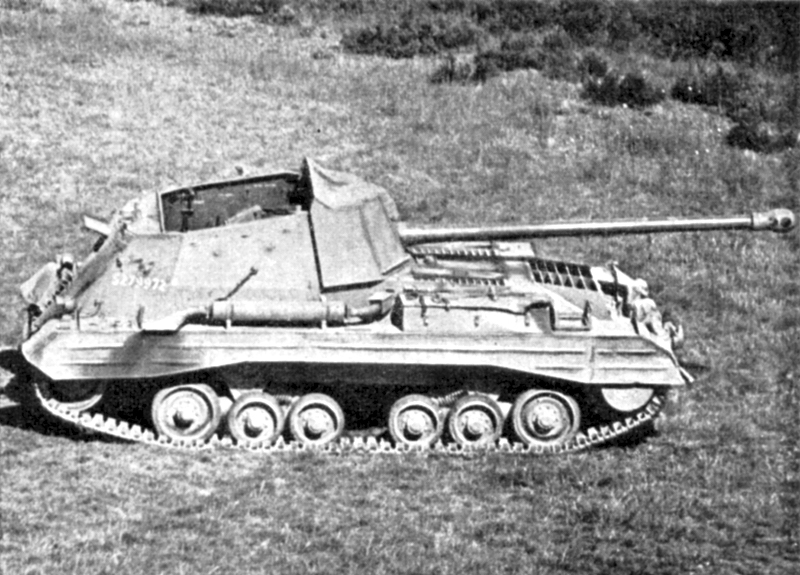
- SP 17pdr, Valentine, Mk I, Archer front (and direction of driving) to left, engine to right
- Type: Self-propelled artillery anti-tank gun
- Place of origin: United Kingdom

Service history
- In service: September 1944 - early 1950s (UK)
- Used by: United Kingdom, Egypt, Jordan
- Wars: Second World War, Suez Crisis

Production history
- Designer: Vickers-Armstrongs
- Manufacturer: Vickers-Armstrongs
- Produced: March 1943 – May 1945
- No. built: 655

Specifications
- Mass: 15 long tons (15 tonnes)
- Length: 21 ft 11 in (6.68 m)
- Width: 9 ft (2.7 m)
- Height: 7 ft 4 in (2.24 m)
- Crew: 4 (Commander, gunner, loader, driver)
- Armour: 14–60 mm (0.55–2.36 in)
- Main armament: QF 17 pounder (76.2 mm) gun 39 rounds
- Secondary armament: .303 Bren light machine gun
- Engine: GMC 6-71 6-cylinder diesel 192 bhp
- Power/weight: 10.1 hp/t
- Suspension: coil spring bogie
- Fuel capacity: 50 imp gal (230 L)
- Operational range: 140 mi (230 km) on roads
- Maximum speed: 20 mph (32 km/h) off-road: 8 mph (13 km/h)

The self-propelled 17-pdr, Valentine, Mk I, Archer was a British tank destroyer of the Second World War based on the Valentine infantry tank chassis fitted with an Ordnance QF 17 pounder gun. Designed and manufactured by Vickers-Armstrongs, 655 were produced between March 1943 and May 1945. It was used in north-west Europe and Italy during the war; post-war, it served with the Egyptian Army. This vehicle was unusual in that its gun faced the rear of the chassis instead of the front.

== Design and development ==
Compared to German tank designs, British tanks generally lagged behind in terms of firepower during the war. This prompted British planners to devise a short-term solution to enhance the firepower of the British Army. They investigated tank chassis in production and landed on the Valentine because of its rapid adaptability to a new role.

It was decided that the 17-pounder gun was to be mounted in a simple, low, open-topped superstructure with the gun facing to the rear to avoid the new design from being too front-heavy due to the 17-pounder's immense weight. The mounting allowed for 11° of traverse to either side, with elevation from -7.5° to +15°. The engine in the Archer had a higher power rating than in the Valentine.

The first prototype was completed in 1943, with firing trials carried out in April 1943. On firing, the gun breech recoiled just shy of the driver's space. The unorthodox way the gun was mounted let the driver stay in position ready to drive the vehicle away without turning around if needed to move quickly. The rear mounting combined with its low silhouette made the Archer an excellent ambush weapon, allowing its crew to fire, then drive away. Vickers-Armstrongs were given orders for 800 vehicles—with 655 being made before the end of the Second World War.

== Operational use and tactics ==
The rear-facing mount of the 17-pounder allowed crews to adopt "shoot-and-scoot" ambush tactics: Archers were typically emplaced behind cover, fired on advancing armour, then drove away without having to turn the vehicle around, which aided rapid withdrawal and survivability in defensive operations. The Archer's low silhouette made concealment easier, increasing the effectiveness of such ambushes, though the confined fighting compartment and limited gun traverse reduced effectiveness in close or highly mobile engagements. Contemporary and later accounts also note that recoil and crew layout constrained ergonomics, but that the vehicle was a practical and economical solution for mounting the powerful 17-pounder on an existing chassis.

== Service ==
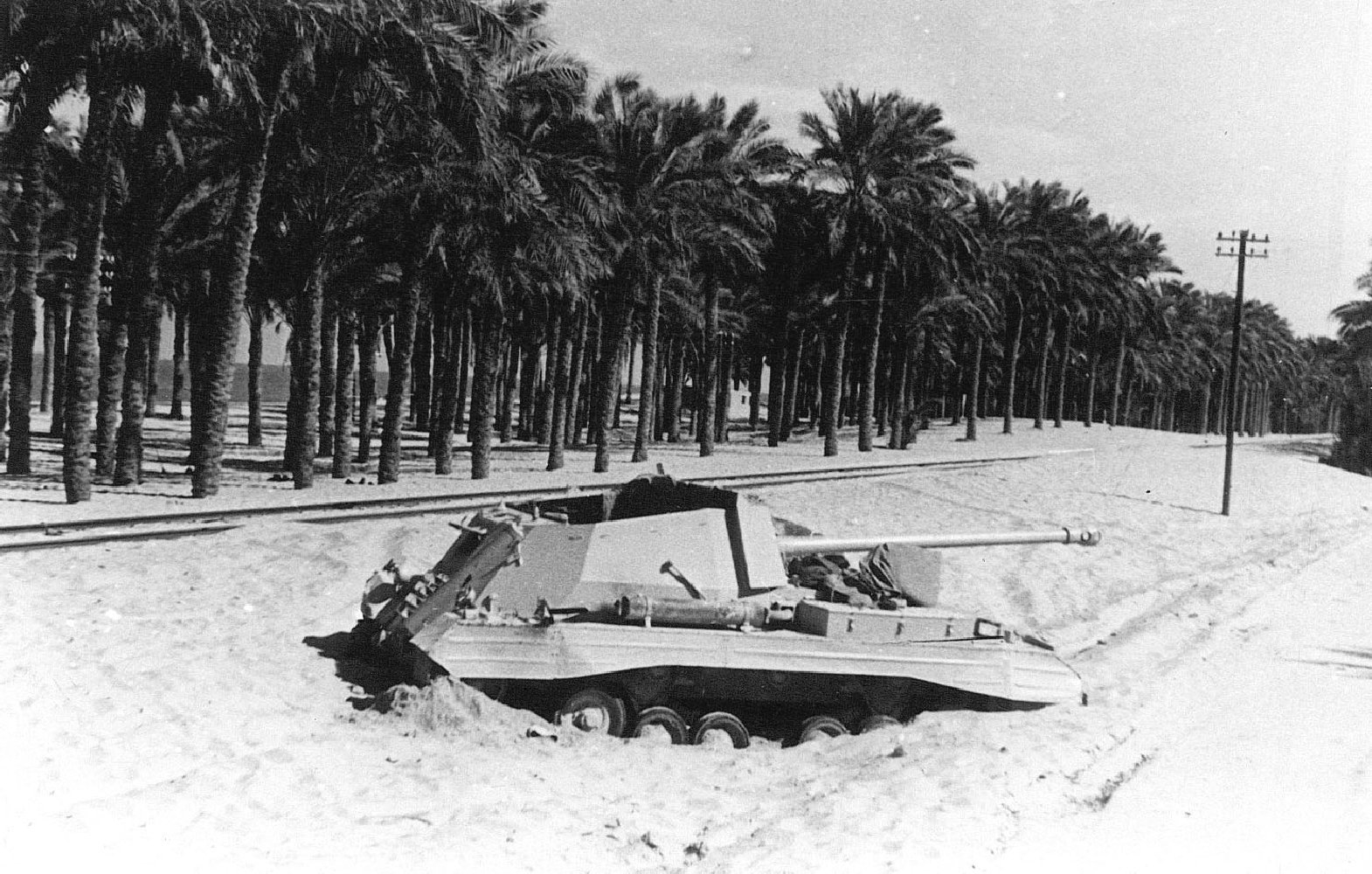
An 'Archer' in position at Rafah, Sinai War, 1956.

Production started in mid-1943 and the Archer entered service in October 1944. It was used in North-West Europe and (in 1945) in Italy.

Under military doctrines prevalent in Commonwealth armies at the time, vehicles such as the Archer were "self-propelled anti-tank guns" and operated by the Royal Artillery (RA), rather than Royal Armoured Corps (RAC). This was the same for two vehicles of US origin, that were initially conceived as "tank destroyers" though not used as such by the British: the 3 in. Self-Propelled Mount M10 and 17 pdr Self-Propelled Achilles.

Post-war, the Egyptian Army received 200 ex-British Archers after the 1948 Arab-Israeli War. Some were successfully used against Israeli armour in 1956. The Archer served with some units of the Royal Armoured Corps in the British Army of the Rhine (BAOR) in the early 1950s.

Jordanian Arab Legion and National Guard were supplied with 36 ex-British Archers in 1952.

== Surviving vehicles ==
Surviving vehicles are preserved at

- Yad La-Shiryon museum in Latrun
- National War and Resistance Museum, Overloon in the Netherlands
- National Military Museum, Soesterberg in the Netherlands
- The Tank Museum in the UK
- The Wheatcroft Collection in the UK, awaiting restoration
- Cavalry Tank Museum, Ahmednagar, India. One Archer with a short-barrelled gun minus gun mantlet
- Australian Armour and Artillery Museum in Cairns, Australia
- The Royal Tank Museum, Amman, Jordan
