= Oxford Tracked Carrier =

Oxford carrier Carrier Tracked, CT20 Carrier, Oxford, Mark I
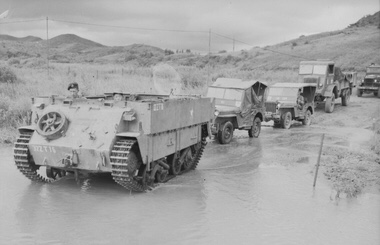
- An Oxford Carrier towing jeeps, Korea, 1952
- Place of origin: United Kingdom

Service history
- In service: 1940s-1950s
- Used by: UK

Production history
- Manufacturer: Morris Ltd
- Produced: 1944-1950
- No. built: ~ 400

Specifications
- Mass: 7 long tons 17 cwt (7.98 t)
- Length: 14 ft 9 in (4.50 m)
- Width: 7 ft 6 in (2.29 m)
- Height: 5 ft 7 in (1.70 m)
- Crew: 3
- Engine: Cadillac V8 petrol, 5,671 cc 110 bhp (82 kW) at 3,200 rpm
- Transmission: Hydramatic
- Suspension: Improved Horstmann
- Operational range: 125 mi (201 km)
- Maximum speed: 31 mph (50 km/h)
- References: Chamberlain & Ellis, Hogg & Weeks

The Oxford Tracked Carrier ("Carrier, Tracked, CT20") was an early post-World War II British armoured personnel carrier (APC) and artillery tractor.

== Design ==
The Oxford was substantially larger - weighing in at 6 long tons (6.1 t) - than the 3-ton Universal Carrier and the Loyd Carriers it was designed to replace. The driver was given better frontal protection and episcope vision. A double bottom improved protection from mines and side armour plates protected the upper track run. Above the tracks along former the outer side of the vehicle were dropside panniers for storage. The engine was at the rear with a Hydramatic transmission, the final drive being in the front of the vehicle. The steering was Cletrac design. Suspension was improved Horstmann with hydraulic shock absorbers.

== Service ==
It saw service in the Korean War, both as a tractor for the 17 pdr anti-tank gun and as an APC.

== Further development ==
Further developments of the Oxford carrier, or alternatives were investigated as its replacement

- CT21-35R - 35 cwt payload carrier, 85 bhp Ford V-8 engine at rear. Designed by Vivian Loyd Ltd.
- CT21-35F - as the 35R but engine at front
- CT23 - 50 cwt payload carrier, twin Ford engines
- CT24 Designed by Rolls-Royce, with leaf spring suspension.
- CT25 - as the Oxford but Rolls-Royce engine with Merritt-Brown gearbox and transmission.
- CT26 - by Vickers-Armstrong design of load carrier, based on A17 light tank chassis..

An improved version of the carrier known as the Cambridge Carrier (FV401) was produced but never got beyond prototype stage.

== Survivors ==
An Oxford Carrier is held in the collection of The Tank Museum. The carrier in question was used to trial hydraulic steering and the system is still fitted to it.

A surviving Oxford Carrier is on display next to other wrecked US, British and other UN combat vehicles in North Korea's Victorious Fatherland Liberation War Museum in its capital of Pyongyang.
