= Australian experimental light tank =

Australian WW2 light tank prototype

The Australian Experimental light tank (AELT, and also known as "Chassis 160") was a prototype light tank built by Australia during World War II, using a local pattern carrier hull.

It was one of two indigenously developed tank designs, the other being the cruiser Sentinel tank.

While the LP1 Chassis 160 was only developed as a light tank prototype, the Sentinel and Thunderbolt were put into production. None of the two Australian developed tanks saw combat.

== Background ==
Australia in 1941 saw the need to produce its own military vehicles, as their normal source, the United Kingdom, could not spare the vehicles because of their own war effort needs. This saw Australia produce a number of armoured cars, and both a light tank and several cruiser tanks. The first effort to create a tank in Australia was the assembly of a light tank, in 1941.

A total of 160 Carrier, MG (Aust) No.1 or LP1, based on the Universal Carrier, were built with the last two, chassis number 159 and 160, being experimental vehicles for developing the LP2 carriers. Number 160 being formally identified as "MG Carrier LP1 Track Displacement-Closed Front".

Chassis 160 was subsequently rebuilt into a light tank with new suspension and a rudimentary cylindrical turret on top of the body for testing. The tank as constructed, however, was found to be completely unmanoeuvrable and a total failure. The project was promptly terminated.

Plans were drawn up for the AELT to be armed with a 2 pounder gun, a 6 pounder gun, and later, when it was started to be produced in Australia, the 25 pounder gun-howitzer much like the AC3 Thunderbolt. The tank would have been able to achieve a speed of about 48 km/h. The tank was of welded construction, with the envisaged turret of a similar polygonal shape to the Crusader tank and the Rhino Heavy Armoured Car. Like the Rhino, the armour thickness was 30mm. Little else is known about the tank.

With increased tank production overseas Australia was able to get access to US-built tanks, and British Matilda II tanks became available after being replaced in British service by later tanks, such as the Churchill.

Visually, the light tank is based on local pattern carrier components, with four wheels per side individually sprung on a Watt's linkage. The upper hull and cylindrical turret are of indigenous design.

== Surviving example ==
There is only one example of the Australian experimental light tank. It was previously on display at The Melbourne Tank Museum, owned by John Belfield. The Museum was closed down in 2006 and the contents were sold off, the tank was for sold for $6215. It is now located at the Puckapunyal Military Museum.
