= Australian Armour and Artillery Museum =

- Established: September 2014
- Location: Cairns, Queensland
- Coordinates: 16.8503°S 145.6951°E
- Type: Armour & Artillery Museum
- Key holdings: Military Vehicles and Artillery
- Collection size: 103 AFVs, 193 total exhibits.
- Visitors: Open to the public
- Owner: Rob Lowden
- Parking: Car park on site
- Website: www.ausarmour.com

The Australian Armour and Artillery Museum is a privately owned museum in Smithfield, Cairns, Queensland, Australia. It is dedicated to tanks, armoured vehicles and artillery from the Second World War and post war periods. It was officially opened in 2014. The museum has purchased a number of vehicles and items for display from overseas, including some items from the Littlefield Collection when it was downsized. It is the largest collection of military vehicles in Australia, and the only major collection of vehicles in Australia apart from the Royal Australian Armoured Corps Memorial and Army Tank Museum at Puckapunyal. It is one of the largest private collections of artillery and AFVs in the world.

The museum houses vehicles from a number of overseas manufacturers, including vehicles from Russia, Germany, Japan, the UK, the US and Czechoslovakia.

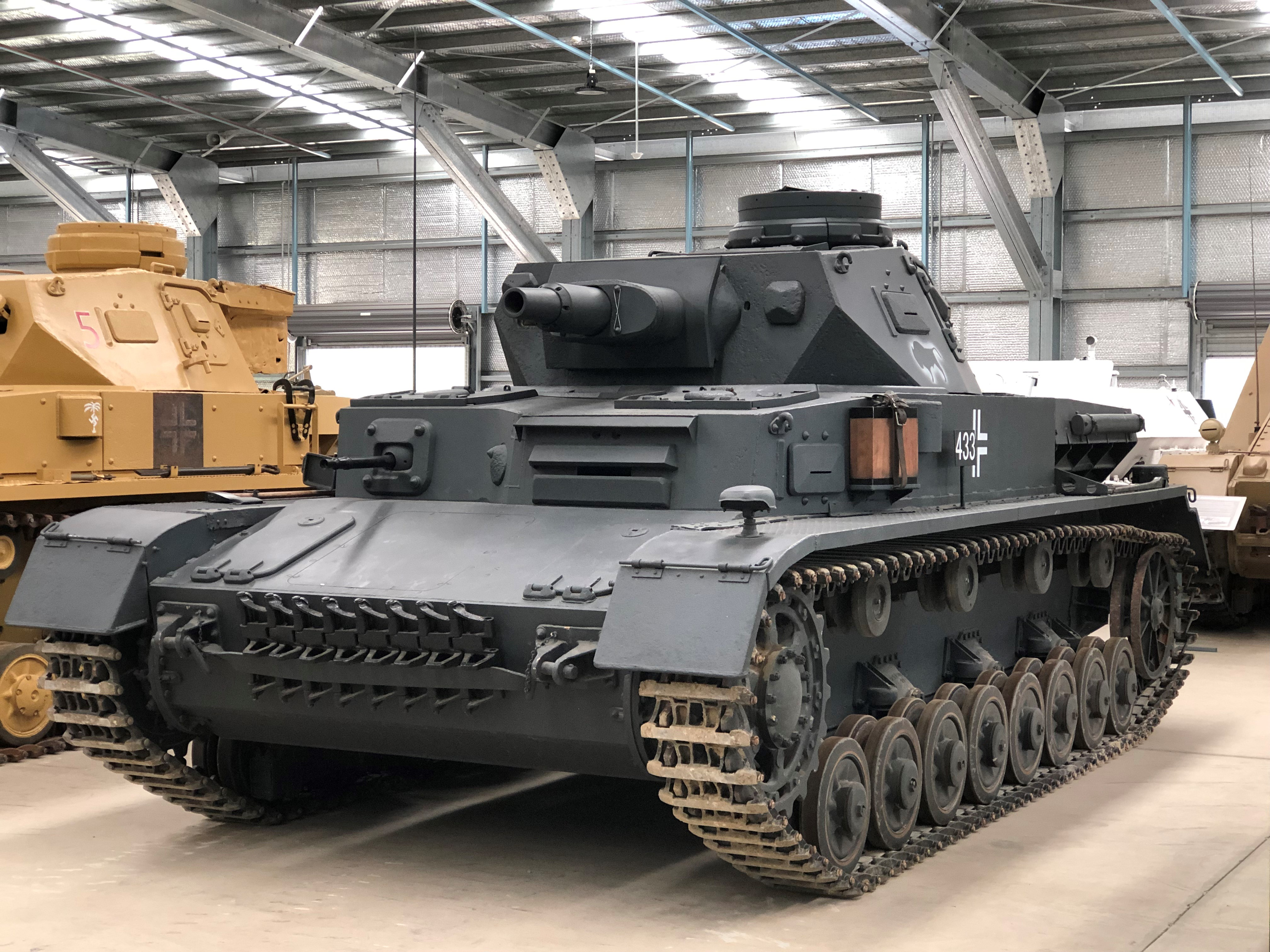
Operational Panzer IV Ausf D

== Collection ==
The museum houses artillery dating back to World War I and vehicles from World War II and the post war period. All up the collection owns more than 100 vehicles, with more than 190 exhibits on display. A number are also in various stages of restoration and transit. The collection features a range of armoured vehicles including German, US, Australian, British and Russian examples.

=== US vehicles ===
US vehicles in the collection include both an early model and later model Stuart, M47 Patton, M48 Patton, M110 self-propelled gun, M3 Lee, M3 Grant, Sherman M4A1, White half-track, Staghound, M52 105mm SPG, LVT4 landing vehicle, M114 Command and Reconnaissance vehicle, M577A1 Command Vehicle (ex Australian Army), M113A1 (ex Australian army), White M3 half-track, Staghound Anti-Aircraft variant, M3 Grant "local farm conversion", M36 Jackson, M7 Priest and M41 Walker Bulldog.

=== Australian vehicles ===
The collection houses two rare Sentinel tanks (AC1 and AC4), Dingo scout car, Local Pattern 2 Carrier, 2 Pdr Attack Carrier Yeramba self-propelled 25-pounder, LP4 Armoured Car, M113 fire support vehicle, S1 (American) Scout car, a Rover MkII armoured car, and a 2-pounder Portee on a Blitz truck.

=== British vehicles ===
Archer, Saladin (two), Chieftain, Humber Armoured Car, Matilda II, WWII British artillery tractor, Sherman Firefly, Churchill Mk VII, Churchill Flail, Churchill AVRE, Centurion, Valentine tank, Saracen, Ferret Mk 2, Fox, FV433 Abbot SPG, Sabre, Bar Mine Layer, Matilda II with Mk3 No.1 Bulldozer blade.

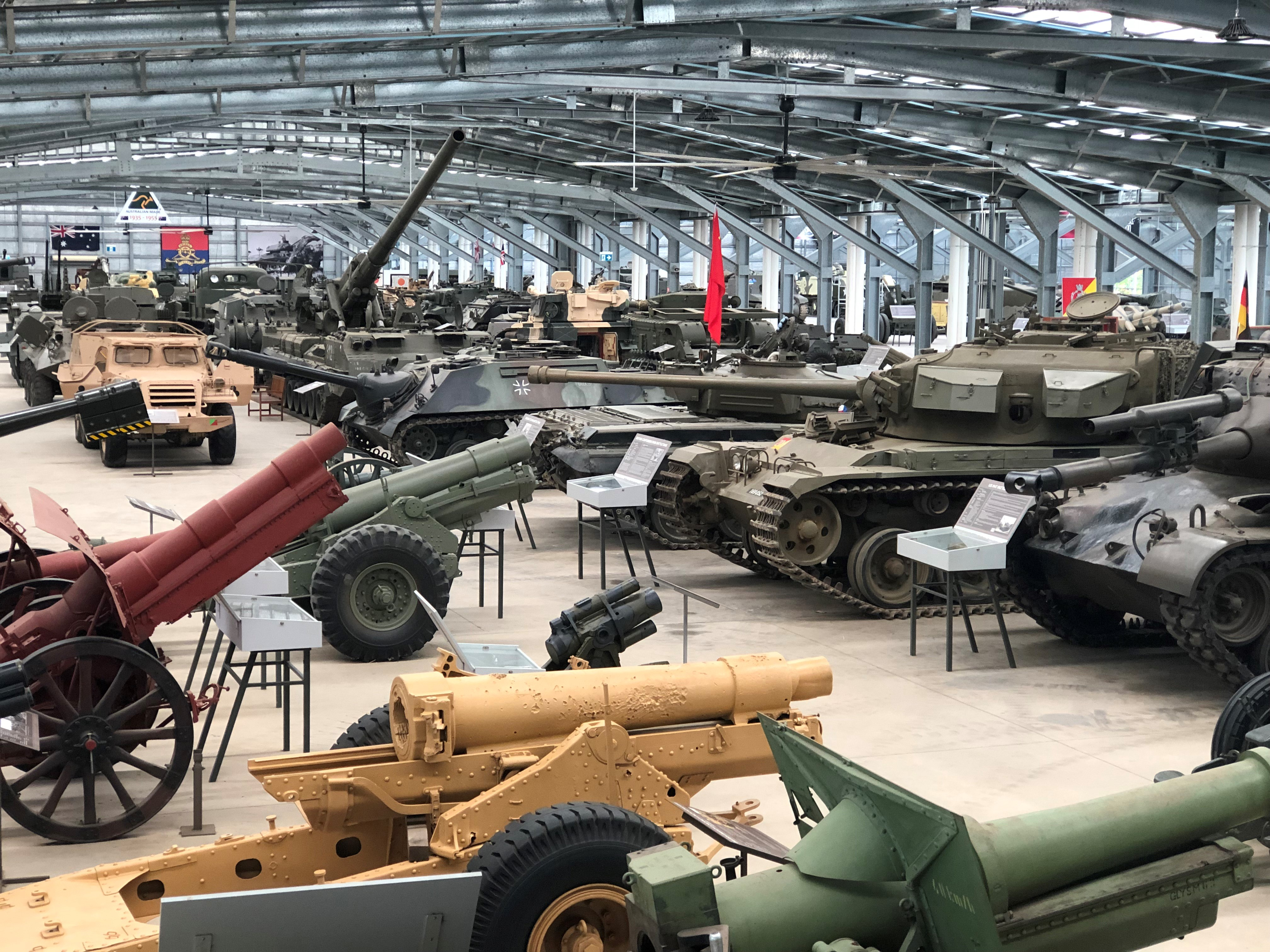
Inside The Australian Armour & Artillery Museum

=== Russian vehicles ===
Soviet artillery tractor, BMP-1, T-55, T-26, T34/85, T-60, T-70, T-72, BTR-152, SU-76, SU-100, ISU-152, 2S7 Pion 203mm SPG, BTR-60 Command version, ATL Artillery Tractor, SA-2 (Surface to Air Missile) and a 2S1 Gvozdika and a rare KV-1S which was recently put on display.

=== German vehicles ===
Panzer 38(t), Jagdpanzer 38(t), Pz.Kpfw. III Ausf J, Pz.Kpfw. VI "Tiger" Hummel, Leopard 1, Kanonenjagdpanzer, Pz.Kpfw. IV Ausf D, Pz.Kpfw. IV Ausf E, Pz.Kpfw. IV Ausf G, Pz.Kpfw. IV Ausf J, Jagdpanther, Kettenkraftrad (Sd.Kfz. 2), Sd.Kfz. 250/3 Ausf A, Sd.Kfz. 250/3 Ausf B, Sd.Kfz 250/8, Sturmgeschütz III Ausf A, Sturmhaubitze 42, Beobachtungpanzer Artillery Observation Vehicle, Sd.Kfz. 251/1 Ausf D, Sd.Kfz. 251/9 Ausf C, Sd.Kfz. 251/22, Sd.Kfz. 11/1, Pz.Kpfw. V Ausf A "Panther", Jagdpanzer IV, Sturmgeschütz IV and a Raupenschlepper Ost RSO mit Pak 40.

A Sturmgeschütz III Ausf G underwent restoration from September 2021 to June 2025 (notable because virtually all the parts came from a single vehicle destroyed in the Courland Pocket) and is now on display.

=== Other countries ===
Other vehicles from other countries include a Canadian Ram Kangaroo, Czech OT810, Canadian Lynx, French Panhard AML, Ford Gun Tractor with Australian Limber and British 25 pdr, Czech Praga with 30mm AA gun, And a Chinese Type 69 that was captured in Iraq and brought to ausarmour in 2026 after restoration in the Netherlands.

=== Vehicles not on display ===
Additionally, there are a number of vehicles owned by the museum, but not currently on display. Mostly these are still being prepared in workshops, either on site or overseas, or they are in transit to the Museum. These include a Cromwell Medium Tank and close to another 25 additional planned exhibits.

== AusArmourfest ==
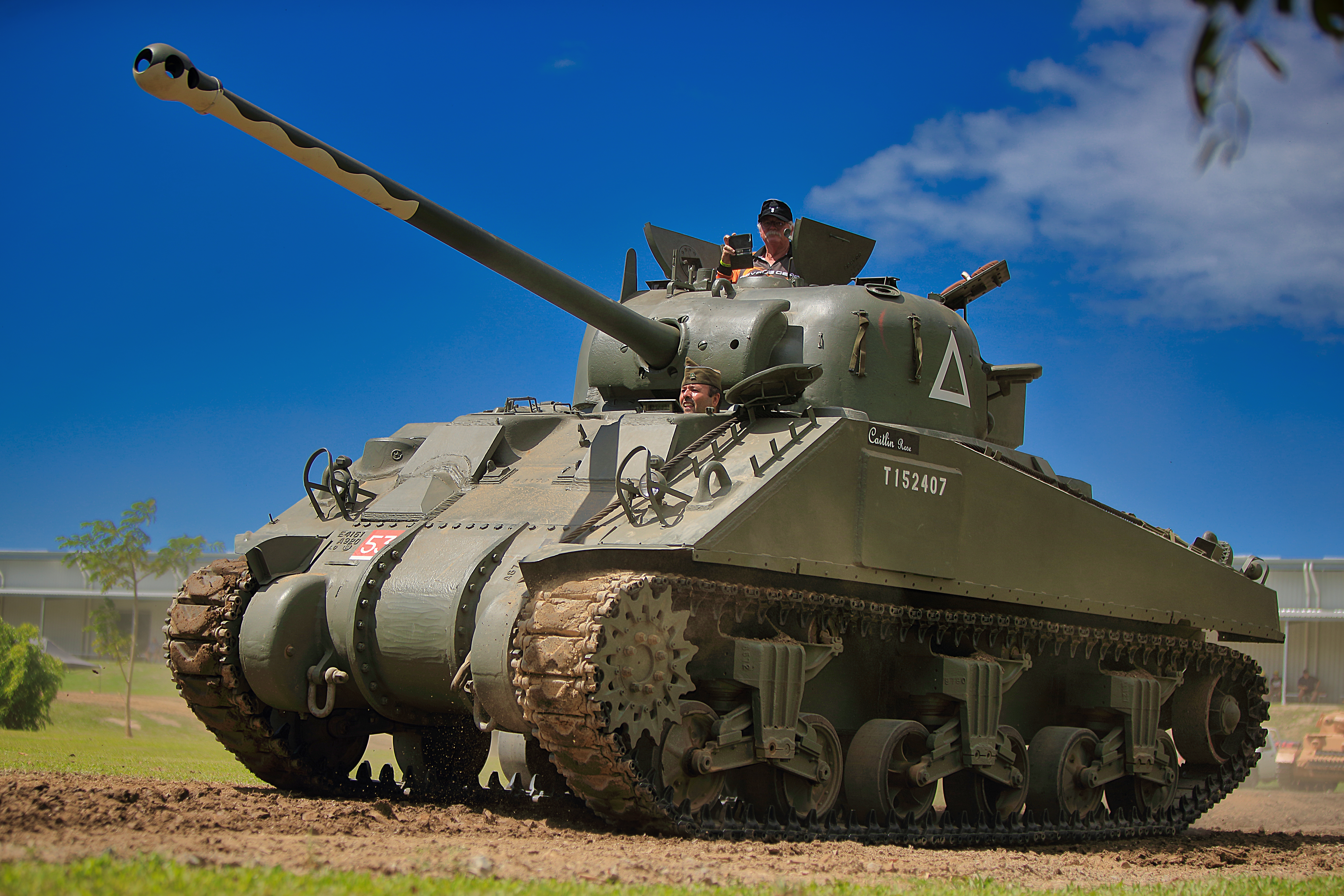
Sherman Firefly at AusArmourfest 2019

Every year, to celebrate the Museums birthday, the Museum hosts a three-day event called AusArmourfest. AusArmourfest gives people the opportunity to go for rides in some of the operational vehicles. In past years, some of the vehicles operated have included the Hetzer, T72, Panzer IV G, Leopard, Kettenkrad, and Sabre.

== Donation of Australian tank from Wargaming Inc ==
The museum hosts two rare Australian Cruiser tanks (two of six left in the world), an AC1 Sentinel and a hybrid AC1 with an AC3 turret, presented as an AC4. The AC1 Sentinel was purchased and given to the museum by Wargaming Inc, producer of the World of Tanks tank game. The Sentinel was in the United States at the Littlefield Collection when that collection sold off many of its vehicles, and Wargaming Inc desired to purchase it and return it to its original home. As part of the purchase, it allowed access to the tank by Wargaming, so that they could study it and replicate it accurately for their game.

== Shooting gallery and workshop ==
The Museum site also includes a 50-metre shooting gallery and a repair/restoration workshop where the vehicles which are in a state of deterioration can be restored. The workshop has a number of staff and can modify and build vehicles. As of 2015, the site has expanded to house more vehicles.

== See also ==
- National Military Vehicle Museum – South Australia
- Royal Australian Armoured Corps Memorial and Army Tank Museum – Victoria, Australia
- The Army Museum Bandiana – Victoria, Australia
- Bundeswehr Museum of German Defense Technology – Koblenz, Germany
- Deutsches Panzermuseum – Munster, Germany
- Musée des Blindés – Saumur, France
- Royal Tank Museum – Amman, Jordan
- The Tank Museum – Bovington, United Kingdom
- United States Army Ordnance Museum – Virginia, USA
- Polish Army Museum – Warsaw, Poland
