= Sentinel tank =

Australian cruiser tank

Australian Cruiser Tank Mk. 1 "Sentinel"
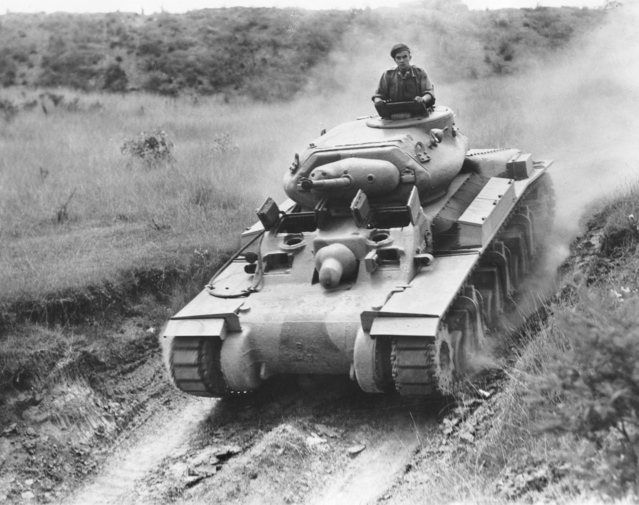
- An AC MkI tank on trials
- Type: Cruiser tank
- Place of origin: Australia

Production history
- Designed: 1941
- Manufacturer: New South Wales Railway Company
- Produced: 1942-1943
- No. built: 65

Specifications
- Mass: 28 long tons (28.4 t)
- Length: 20 ft 9 in (6.32 m)
- Width: 9 ft 7/8 in (2.77 m)
- Height: 8 ft 4 3/4 in (2.56 m)
- Crew: 5 (Commander, Gunner, Loader/Operator, Driver, Hull MG gunner)
- Armour: Hull front 65 mm (2.6 in) sides and rear 45 mm (1.8 in); Turret 65 mm (2.6 in) all round
- Main armament: 2 pounder tank gun, 130 rounds
- Secondary armament: two .303 (7.7 mm) Vickers machine guns, 4,250 rounds
- Engine: 3 x Cadillac V8; 330 hp (246 kW)
- Power/weight: 12 hp/ton
- Suspension: Hotchkiss with horizontal volute spring
- Operational range: 150 mi (240 km)
- Maximum speed: 30 mph (48 km/h)

The AC1 Sentinel was a cruiser tank designed in Australia in World War II in response to the war in Europe, and to the threat of Japan expanding the war to the Pacific or even a feared Japanese invasion of Australia. It was the first tank to be built with a hull cast as a single piece, and the only tank to be produced in quantity in Australia. The few Sentinels that were built never saw action as Australia's armoured divisions had been equipped by that time with British and American tanks.

== History ==
A memorandum on the tank was issued by the Australian General Staff in November 1940 said "the tank must... possess considerable immunity from the fire of anti-tank weapons and from field artillery which is prepared to engage tanks in the vicinity . This partial immunity is achieved by a combination of speed and armour...The tank must carry a weapon with which to engage hostile tanks and also weapons of the anti-personnel type....The War Office has advised that in-adequately armoured tanks are a death trap"

When design work began in November 1940, the AC1 was originally intended to be a 2 pounder (40 mm) gun-equipped vehicle, a true Cruiser tank, with a weight of between 16 and 20 tonnes. Due to a lack of home grown experience in tank design, a mission was sent to the US to examine the M3 design and Colonel W.D. Watson MC, a First World War artillery officer with many years of tank design experience was provided by the UK. Watson arrived - via an inspection of US medium tank development - in December 1940 and was appointed technical advisor to the new Army Design Directorate. Like the Canadian Ram, the Australian Cruiser was to be based on the engine, drive train, and lower hull of the American M3 Medium tank, mated to an upper hull and turret built closely along the lines of a British Crusader. Watson modified the specification produced an initial design incorporating British ideas of low silhouette and with heavier armour. Rolled steel plate for construction was not possible as production was already engaged in munitions production and the American engine used in the M3 was not available in Australia. Progress slowed in 1941 with divergent ideas between the involved groups and a lighter alternative design AC2 proposed was unacceptable to the army. The prime minister Robert Menzies intervened - "in effect [he] told the experts among them to stop arguing and build some tanks " - and subsequently created a separate Directorate of Armoured Fighting Vehicles at Fishermen's Bend, Victoria to steer tank production.

To fit with production available the diversion from the M3 medium design included: "crash" gearbox instead of synchromesh , simplified track, Hotchkiss type suspension instead of vertical volute , one-piece cast hull, and use of automotive engines.

By 1942, attempting to keep pace with German tank developments, the design specification had become more like an American medium tank, resulting in a heavier design and a higher silhouette profile.

The Australian Cruiser tank Mark 1 (AC1) was designated "Sentinel" in February 1942. Manufactured by the New South Wales Railway Company, fabrication took place at Sydney's Chullora Tank Assembly Shops with serial production vehicles emerging in August 1942, the premises also being used as a testing ground. The design used existing parts where available from other tank designs, simplified where necessary to match the machining capacity present in Australia. The hull was cast as a single piece, as was the turret; a technique not used on the hull of any other tanks of the era.

The Sentinel was designed to mount either a QF 2 pounder or a QF 6 pdr (57 mm, 2.25 in). However, as the production order for 6 pounder tank guns had not been acted on, none of these were available and the first 65 tanks were built with the 2 pounder. Two Vickers machine guns were carried as secondary armament, one in the hull and a second mounted coaxially beside the main gun.

The preferred engines suitable to power a 28 tonne tank, a Pratt & Whitney Wasp single row petrol radial aeroengine, or a Guiberson diesel radial, were not available within Australia, so the Sentinel was powered by the combined output of three Cadillac V8 engines – petrol car engines with a displacement of 346 cu in (5.7 L) each. The three engines were installed in a clover-leaf configuration (two engines side-by-side to the front and a single to the rear) with all feeding power to a common gearbox.

Sixty-five production vehicles had been completed by June 1943. The completed Sentinel tanks were used for evaluation purposes only and were not issued to operational armoured units. The Australian Cruiser tank programme was terminated in July 1943 as it was thought better for Australia to put the effort spent on the AC tanks towards building her own railway locomotives and supporting the large number of US tanks due to arrive. The tanks that had been produced were placed in storage until the end of the war. In 1943, the 3rd Army Tank Battalion was equipped with a squadron of AC1 tanks that had been modified to resemble German tanks. These tanks were used in the filming of the movie The Rats of Tobruk. This appears to have been the only time a squadron of Sentinels was used for any purpose.

== Further experiments ==
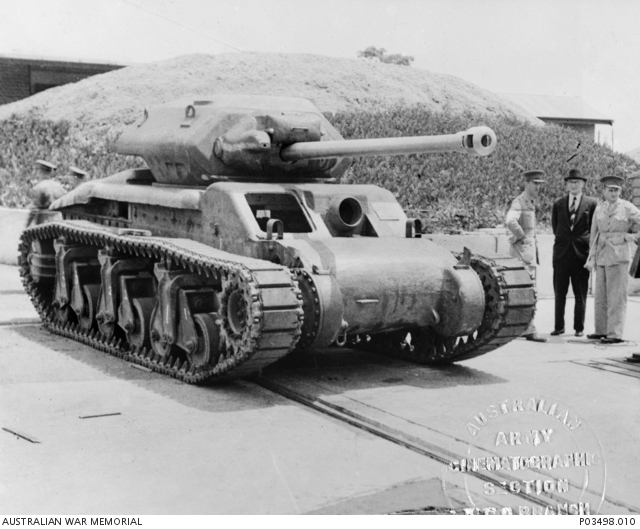
AC E1 development vehicle with a test turret and 17 pounder gun

In mid-1941, due to delays in the Sentinel’s development, the AC2 Cruiser was designed. The AC2 was a modified Sentinel with thinner armor and a less powerful engine that was designed to be simple and quick to produce. However, the Australian Army deemed the armor and speed of the AC2 lackluster compared to preexisting contemporary tanks, and the government did not want to take resources away from the ongoing AC1 Sentinel project at the time. Therefore, the project was soon cancelled.

The Sentinel was to be succeeded by the AC3 Thunderbolt, a much improved design with better armour protection, and most importantly increased firepower. The next step up in firepower available in Australia was the 25 pounder (87.6 mm, 3.45 in) gun-howitzer. This was quickly redesigned as a tank gun, work that would later prove useful for the design of the Short 25 Pounder.

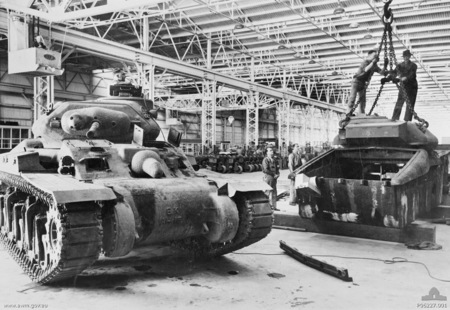
The AC I under construction at the Chullora tank annexe

In an effort to further improve the firepower of the Australian produced tanks, a new turret was built and placed on the first of the earlier development vehicles to assess the vehicle's ability to mount the foremost Allied anti-tank gun of the day – the British 17-pounder (76 mm, 3 in). This was achieved by mounting two 25 pounder gun-howitzers that, when fired together, would significantly exceed the recoil of a 17 pounder. It was later fitted with a 17 pounder and after successful gunnery trials the 17 pounder was selected for the AC4 tank. On the AC4 tank, the 17 pounder was to be mounted in a new and larger turret, attached by a 70 inch (1778 mm) diameter turret ring, the space for which was accommodated by changes to the upper hull permitted by the compact nature of the "Perrier-Cadillac". (Note: Named after the French engineer and tank designer Robert Perrier who was largely responsible for the design) The design for the AC4 tank was not finalised before the programme ended.

== Survivors ==
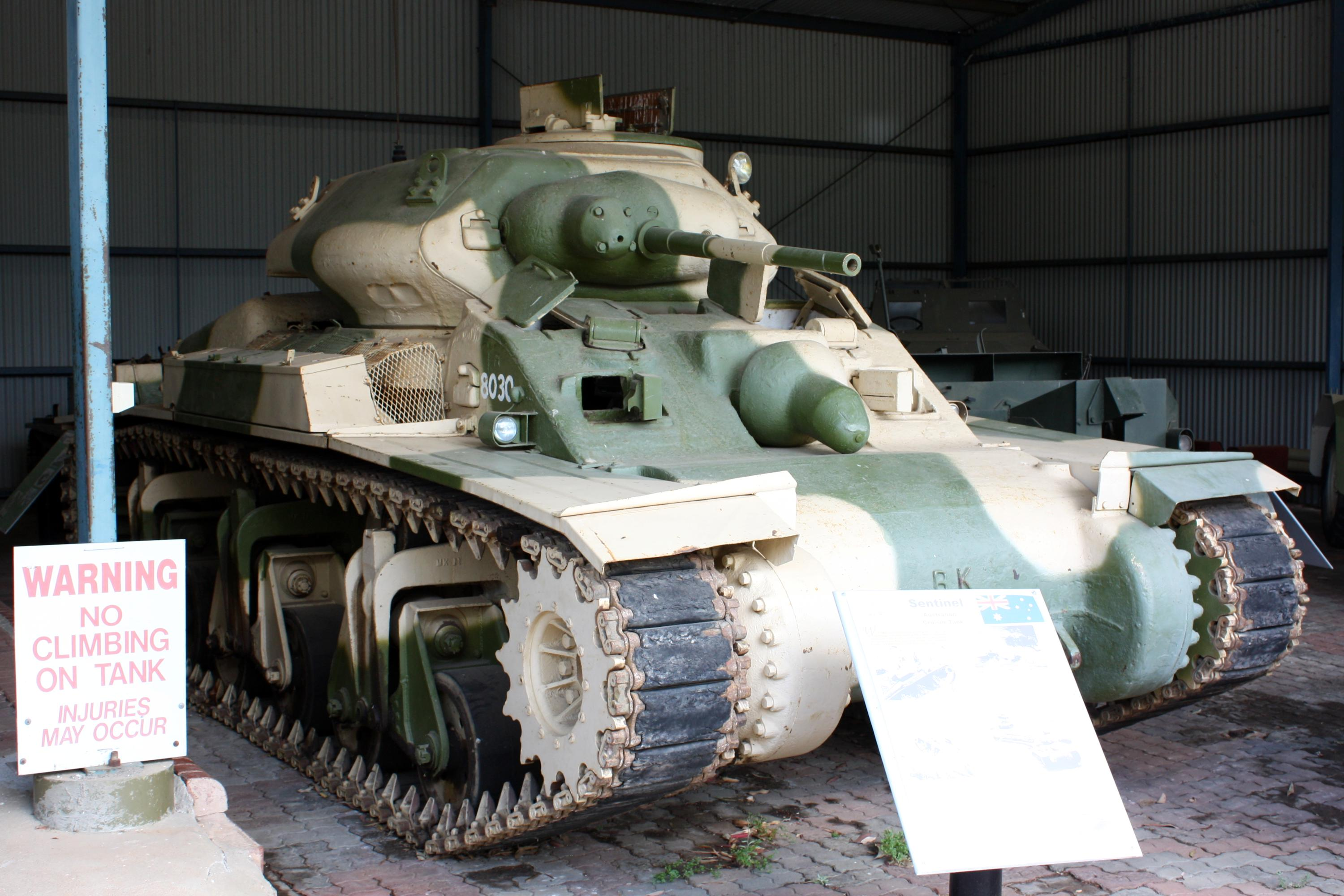
The AC1 Sentinel 8030 at the RAAC Tank Museum.

All but three tanks were disposed of by the Australian government in 1945. (Note: Some sources, including the official history, state that the Sentinels were used for training after the cancellation of the program, and were not declared obsolete by the Australian Army for this purpose until 1956. Koudstaal states that the Sentinels were put into storage, they were too different to the M3s and Matildas to be used for training and would require modifications and the manufacture of spares if they were to be used as special purpose vehicles. In 1945, three had been selected for preservation in war museums, while the remainder were dismantled.) The 65 tanks that were not required to serve as a physical record in war museums in Australia and the UK were sold off by the Commonwealth Disposals Commission.

Of the three that were retained, the first is at the RAAC tank museum at Puckapunyal Victoria (AC1 serial number 8030), the second is at the Bovington Tank Museum (AC1 serial number 8049), the third and only completed AC3 (serial number 8066) is located at the Treloar Resource Centre at the Australian War Memorial in Canberra.

From those that were sold, mostly for agricultural use, a third AC1 was reassembled at the Melbourne Tank Museum using the hull of AC1 8006 and the turret of AC1 8040. This tank was sold to the Military Vehicle Technology Foundation when the Melbourne Tank Museum closed in 2006, and subsequently bought by Wargaming when the MVTF collection was partly auctioned in 2014. It was placed on exhibit at the Camp Mabry Museum in Austin, Texas, for a period before being shipped to the Australian Armour and Artillery Museum to be repainted and put on display.

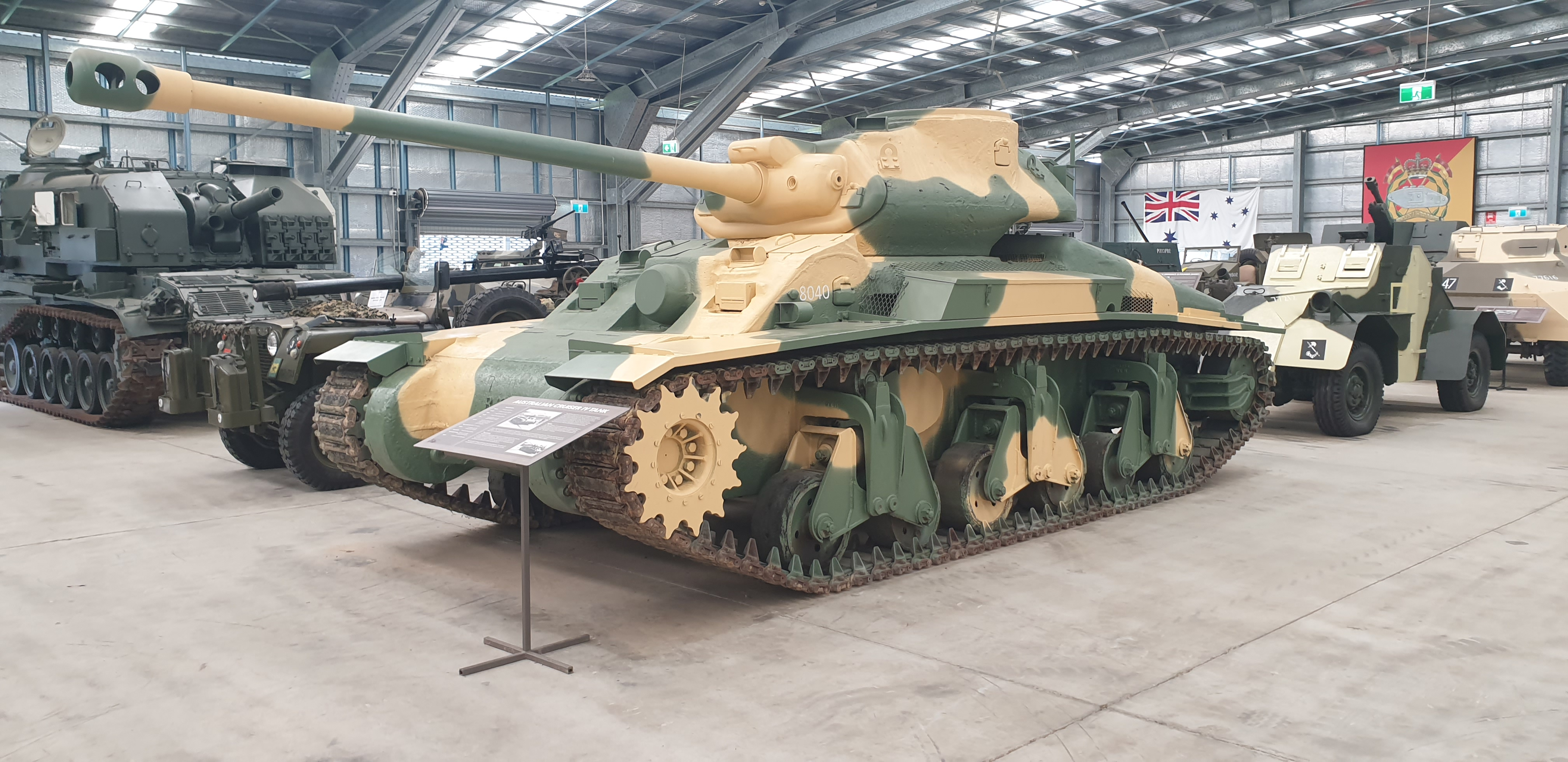
AC1 Sentinel 8040 with the turret of an AC3 Thunderbolt, made to look like an AC4 tank in the Australian Armour and Artillery Museum in 2021

A second Australian cruiser tank is also on display at the AAAM. This tank, acquired from the MTM, has a largely uncut hull, with turret, gearbox and running gear, otherwise bare inside. This vehicle consists of the hull of AC1 8040 and an AC3 turret. The tank was externally restored in 2014. It now has a 17 pounder barrel in an attempt to represent the AC4 prototype; the mantlet and gun mount were fabricated by the AAAM. An AC3 mockup was assembled from unused AC3 armour castings and a mix of AC3 and AC1 parts at the Melbourne Tank Museum in 1996–97, this piece was sold to a private collector in 2006.

== Variants ==
- AC IA
  - 1x QF 6-pounder gun
  - 1x Vickers machine gun
  - 3x Cadillac V8 engines
- AC IB
  - 1x QF 25 pounder gun
  - 1x Vickers machine gun
  - 3x Cadillac V8 engines
- AC III "Scorpion" An AC1 that was to be produced in Victoria with mostly components imported from the US. Not related to the AC3 Thunderbolt.
  - 1x QF 2-pounder gun
  - 2x Vickers machine gun
  - 1x single-row Wasp radial engine

== See also ==
Tanks of comparable role, performance, and era

- Australia Thunderbolt
- British Cromwell
- Canadian Ram II
- German Panzer IV
- Hungarian Turán III prototype
- Italian Carro Armato P 40
- Italian P43 (proposal)
- Japanese Type 3 Chi-Nu
- Romanian 1942 medium tank (proposal)
- Soviet T-34
- Swedish Stridsvagn m/42
- United States M4 Sherman

Other Commonwealth tanks of the Second World War

- Bob Semple tank – New Zealand indigenous tank design
- Grizzly tank – Canadian licence built M4A1 Sherman
- Schofield tank – New Zealand indigenous tank design
- Australian experimental light tank – Australia's second effort at producing a locally made tank.

== Notes ==
Footnotes

Citations
