= Royal Australian Armoured Corps Memorial and Army Tank Museum =

Australian Army Museum Puckapunyal
- Established: May 1970
- Location: Victoria, Australia
- Coordinates: 37°00′S 145°02′E
- Type: Tank and Military Museum
- Collection size: at least 80 Tanks/AFVs

The Royal Australian Armoured Corps Memorial and Army Tank Museum has changed its name to the Australian Army Museum Puckapunyal and is located at Puckapunyal, an Australian Army training facility and base 10 km west of Seymour, in central Victoria, south-eastern Australia. The base is the home of the Royal Australian Armoured Corps.

== Access ==
The Museum is not accessible to pedestrians or public transport including taxi's or busses. Visitors are recommended to use their own car or travel as a group. Access is by booking only and Base passes for visiting the museum can be collected at the security checkpoint on Blamey Avenue.

== Collection ==
The museum features over 80 armoured fighting vehicles on outdoor and indoor display, and uniforms, weapons, medals, artefacts and memorabilia of both the Royal Australian Armoured Corps and the Royal Australian Artillery.

=== Gallery ===
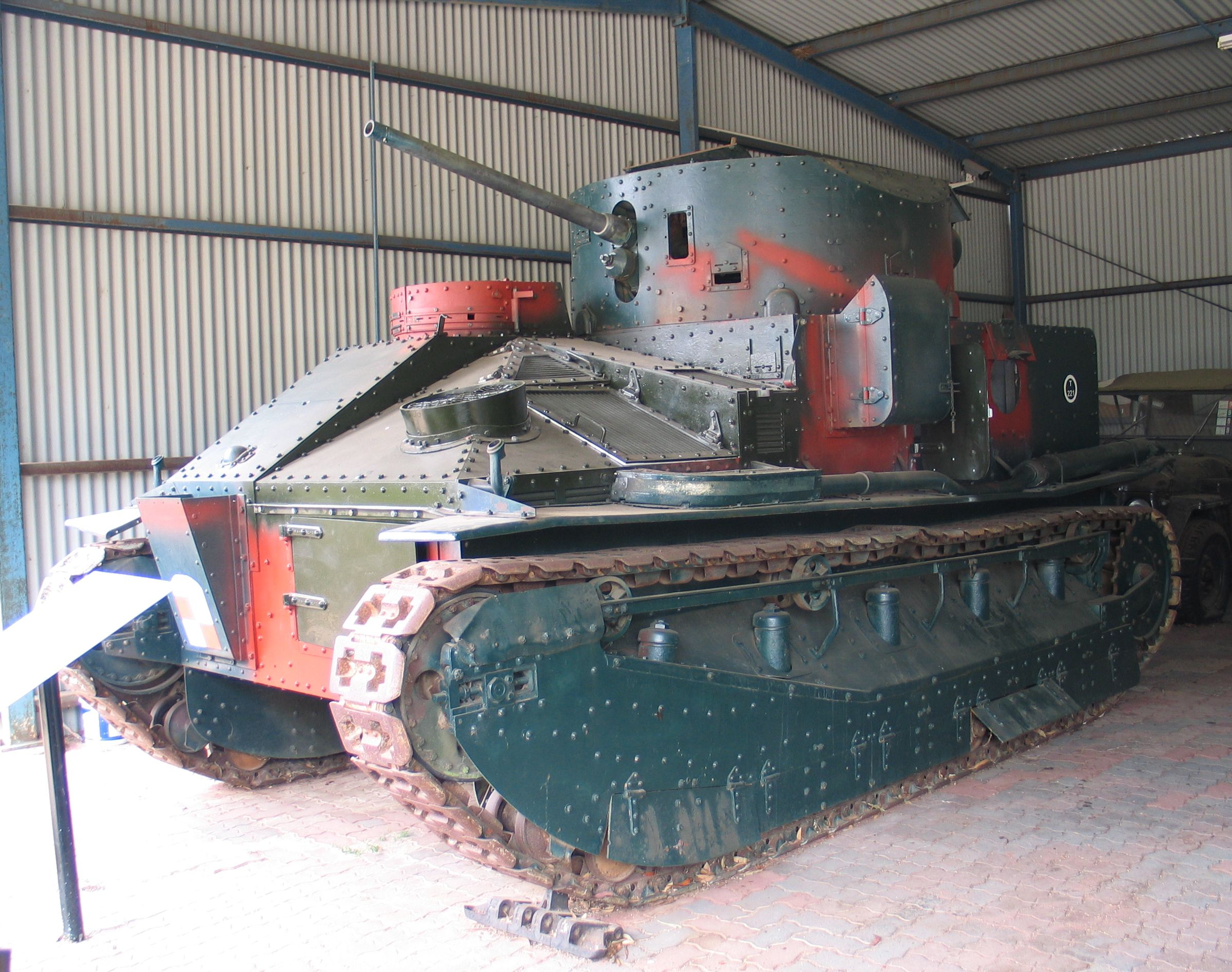
Vickers Medium Tank Mk II (Special)

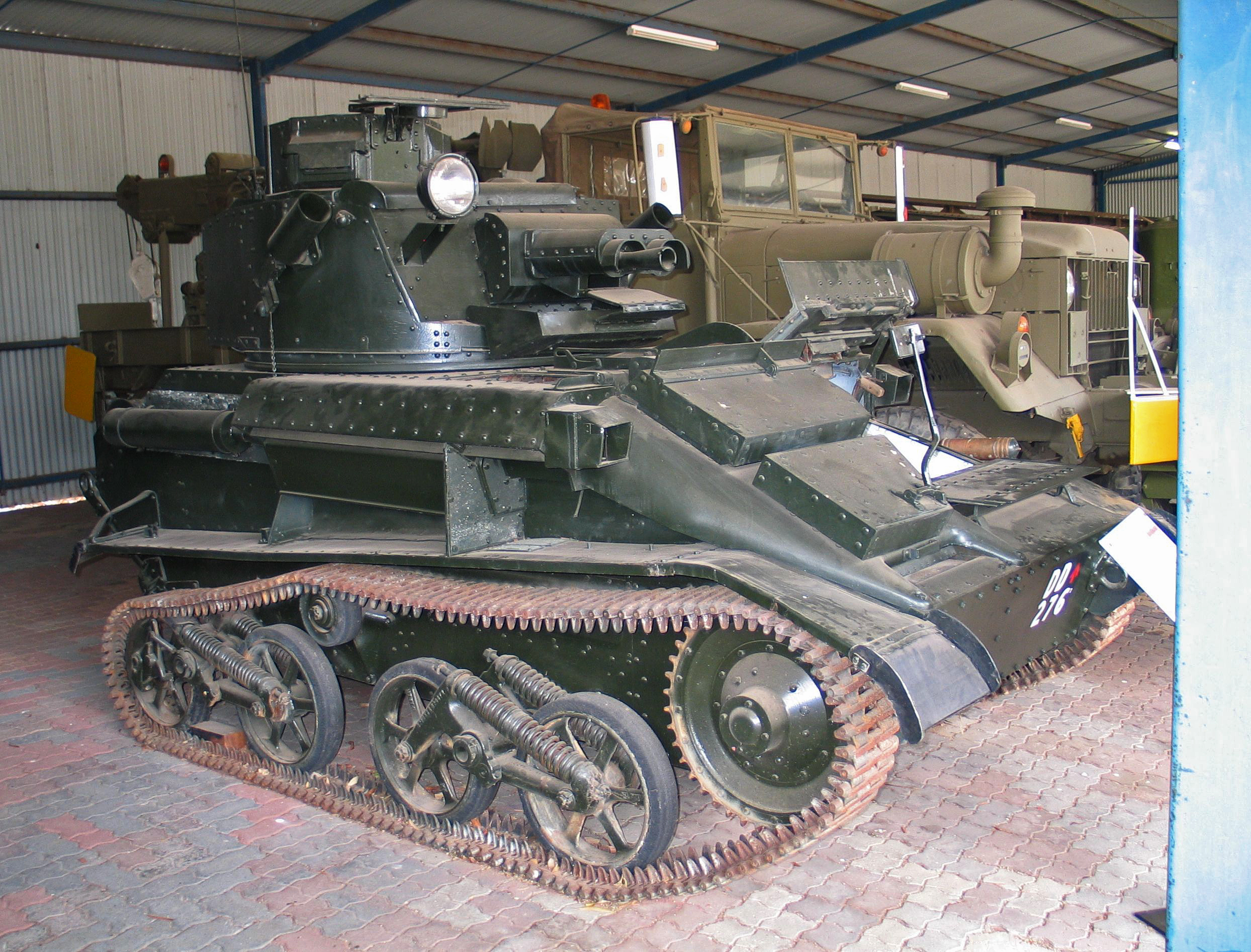
Vickers Mk VIA light tank

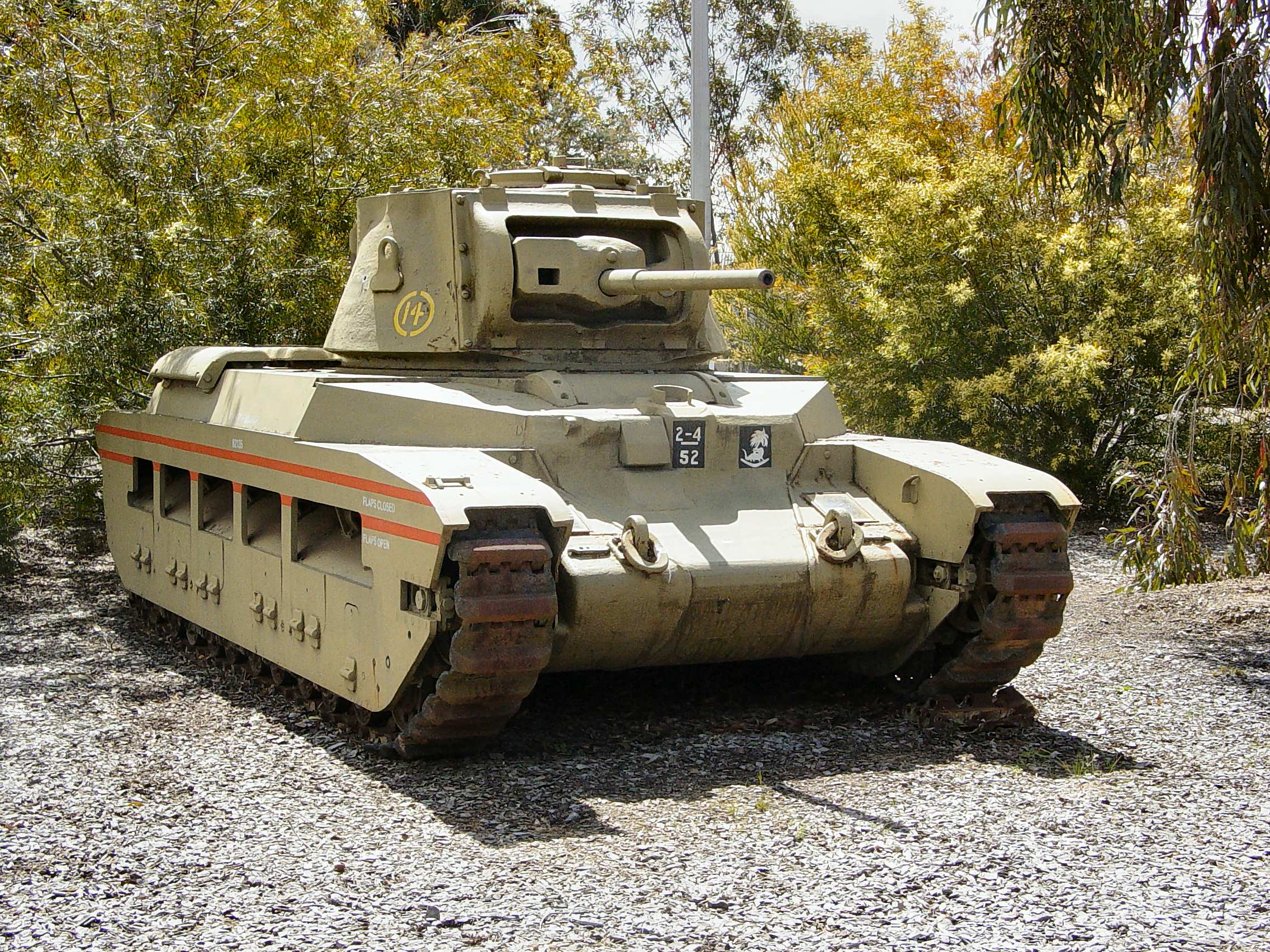
A Matilda II tank

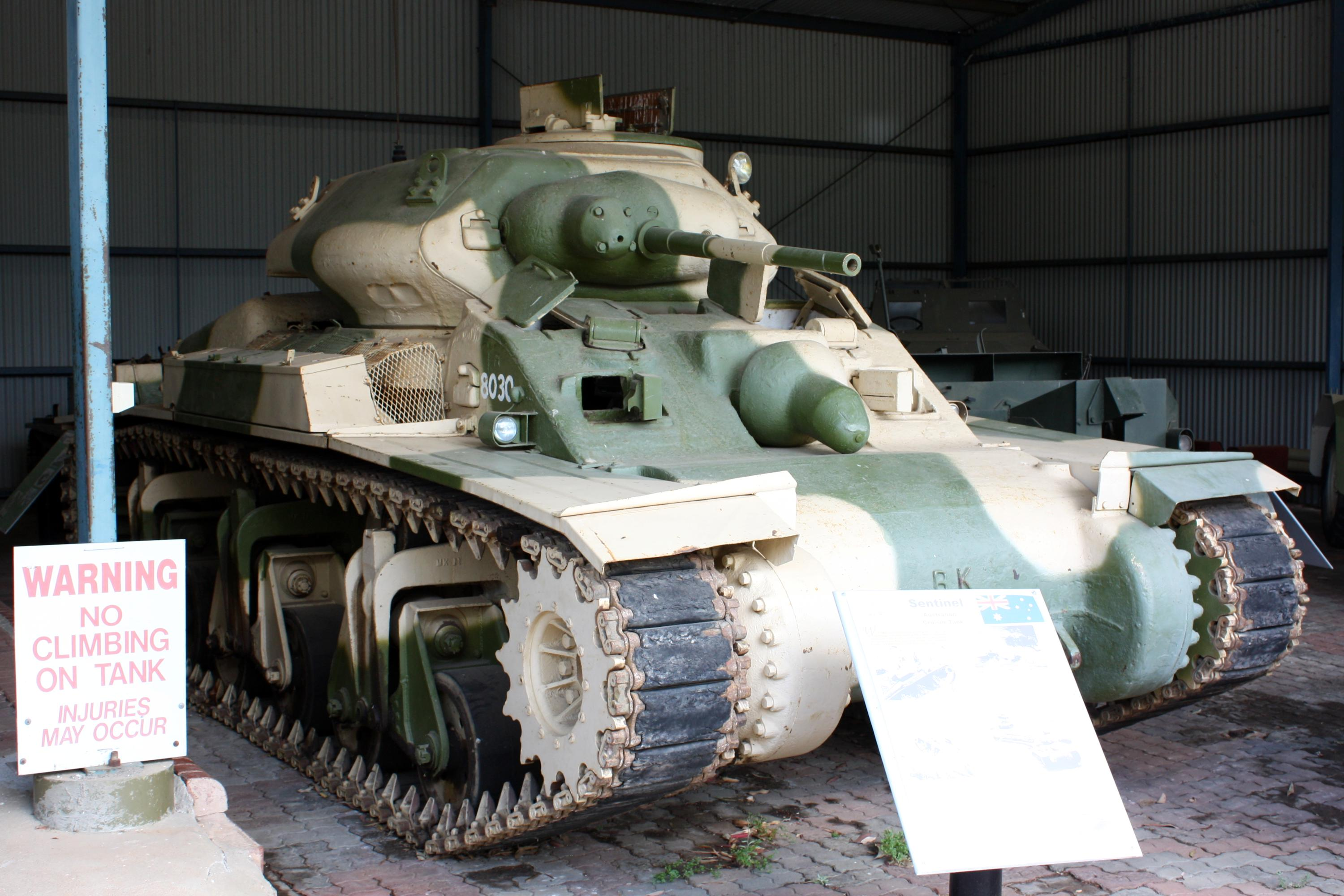
The AC1 Sentinel tank

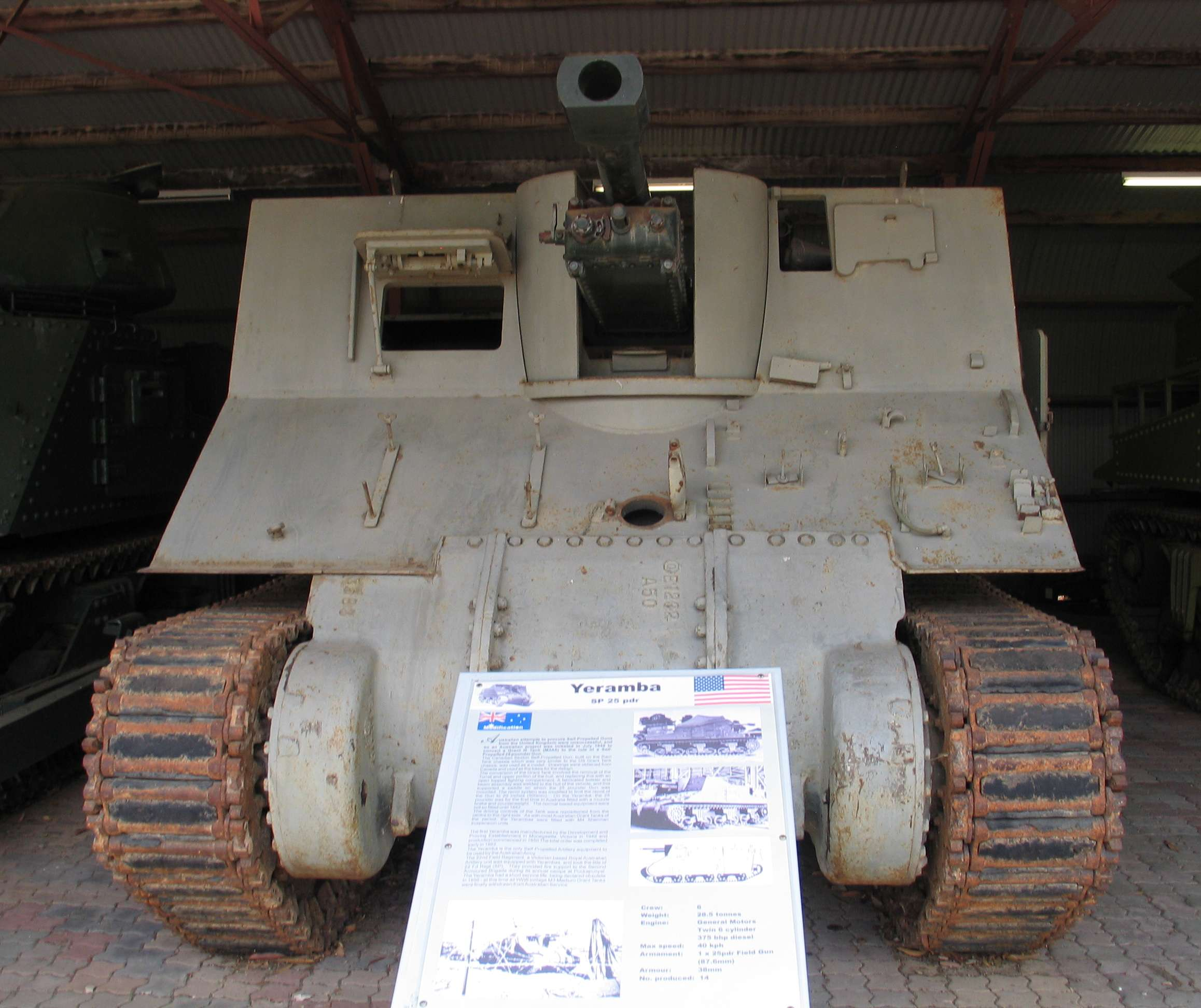
Yeramba Self-propelled Gun

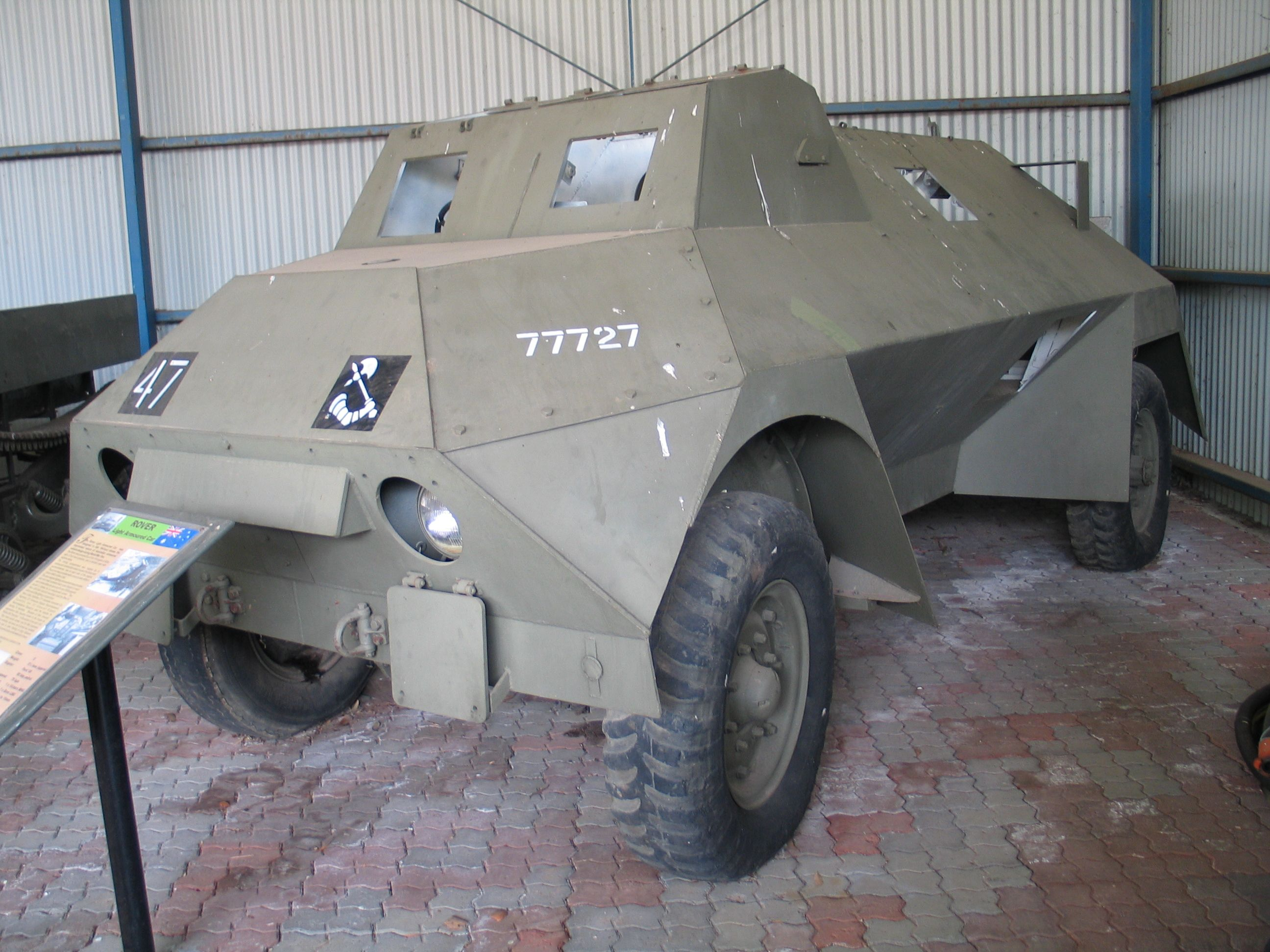
Rover Light Armoured Car

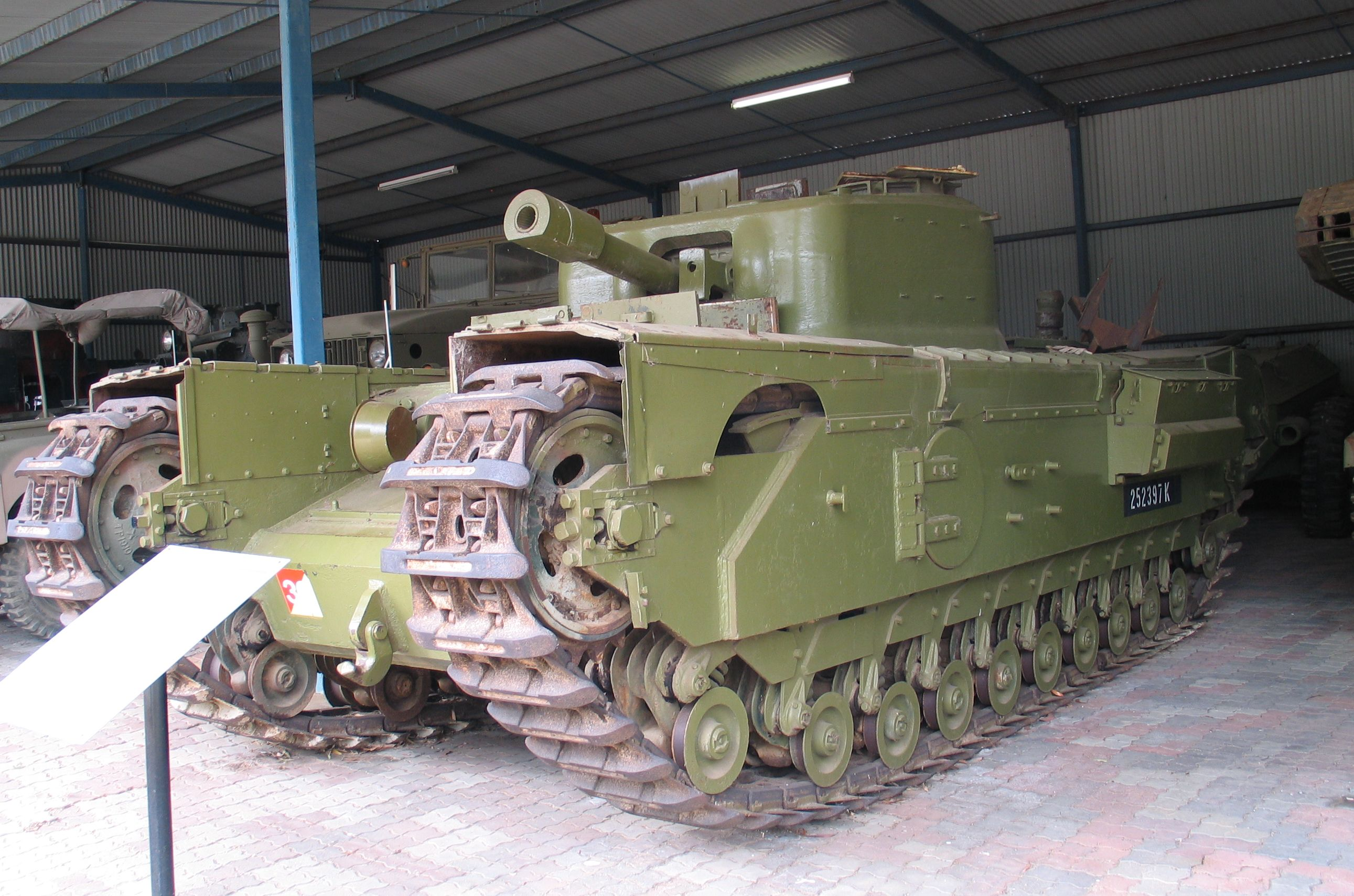
Infantry Tank Mk IV Churchill in "Crocodile" flamethrower configuration

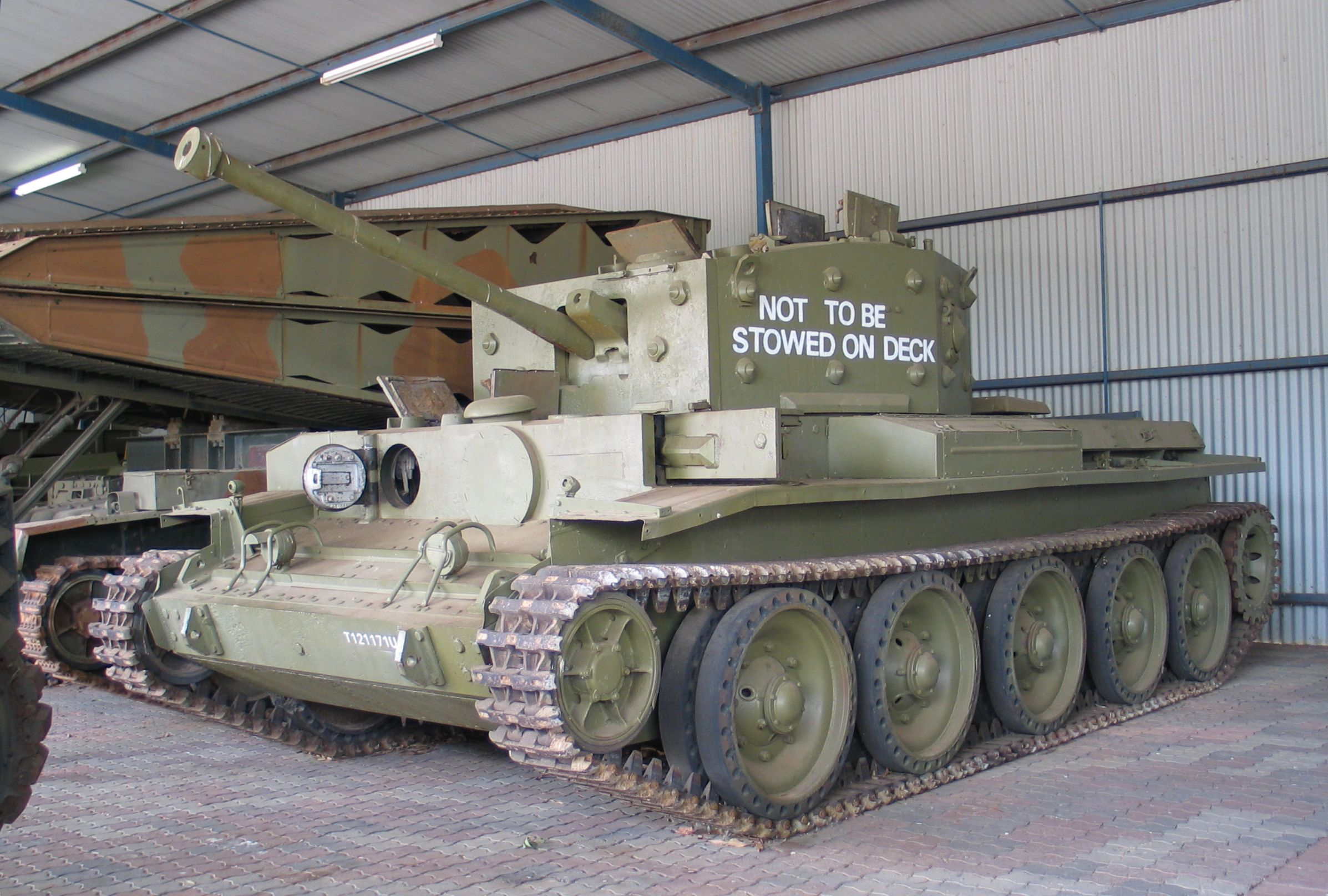
Cruiser Tank Mk VIII Cromwell Mk I

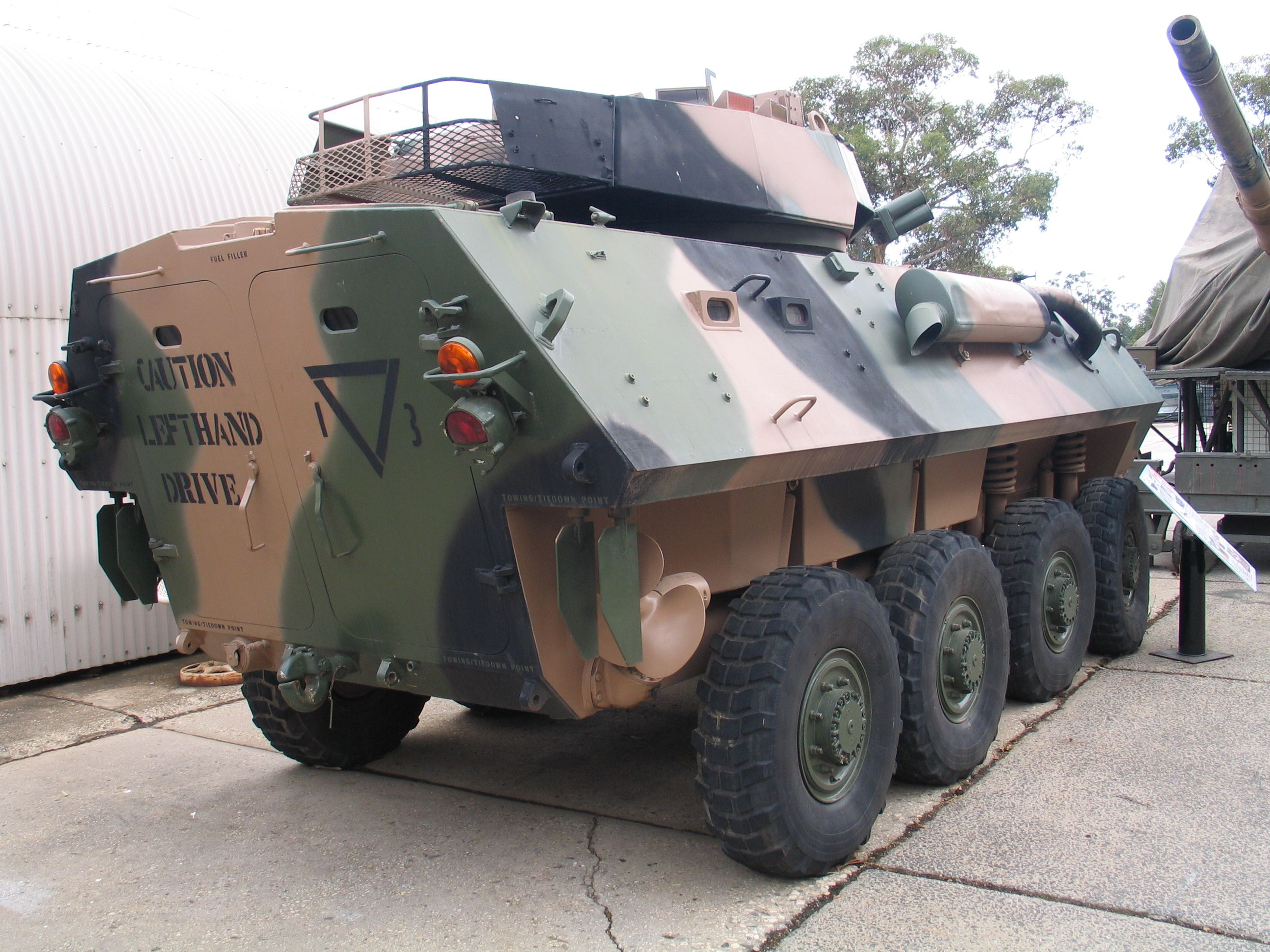
ASLAV-25

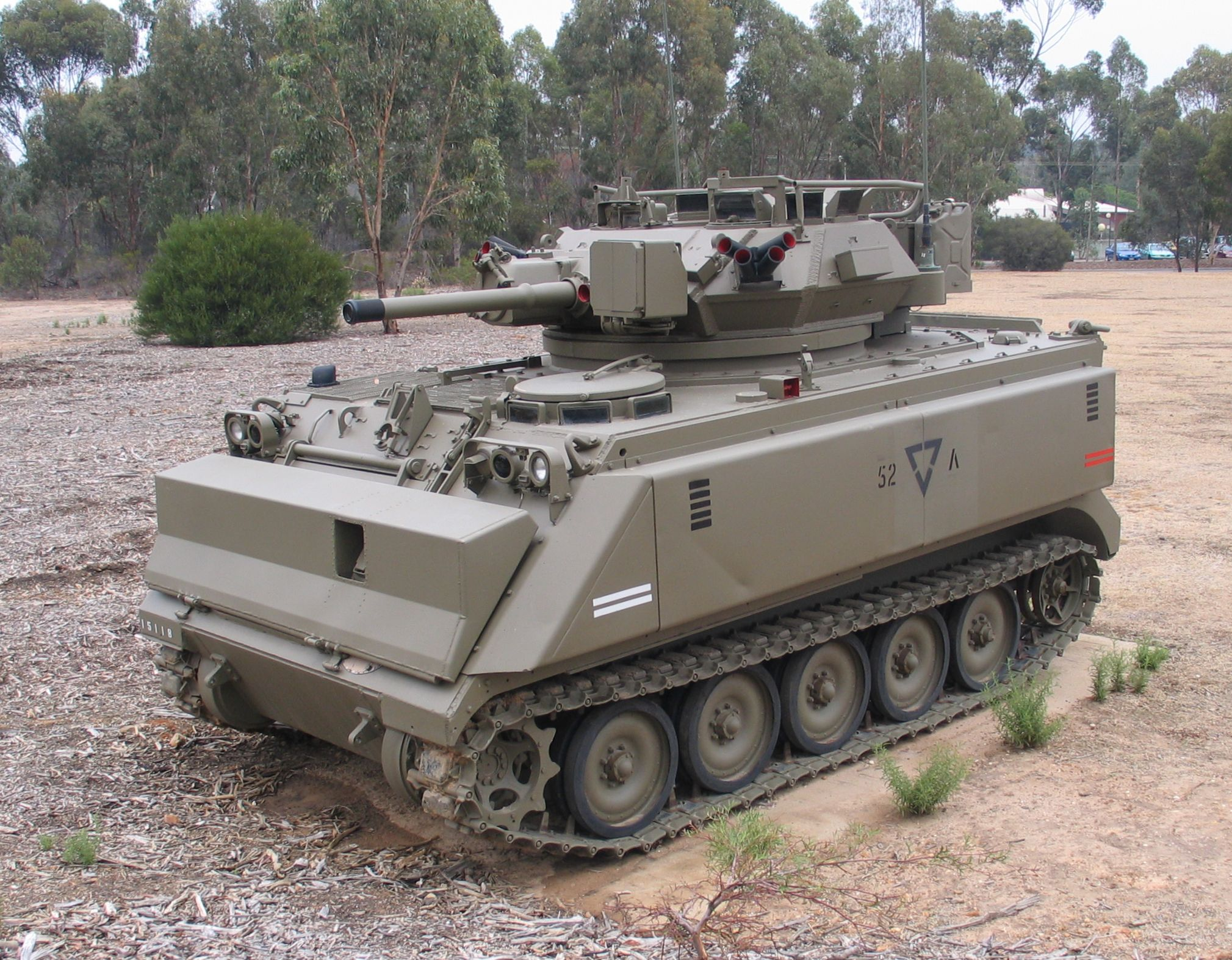
Australian M113 MRV

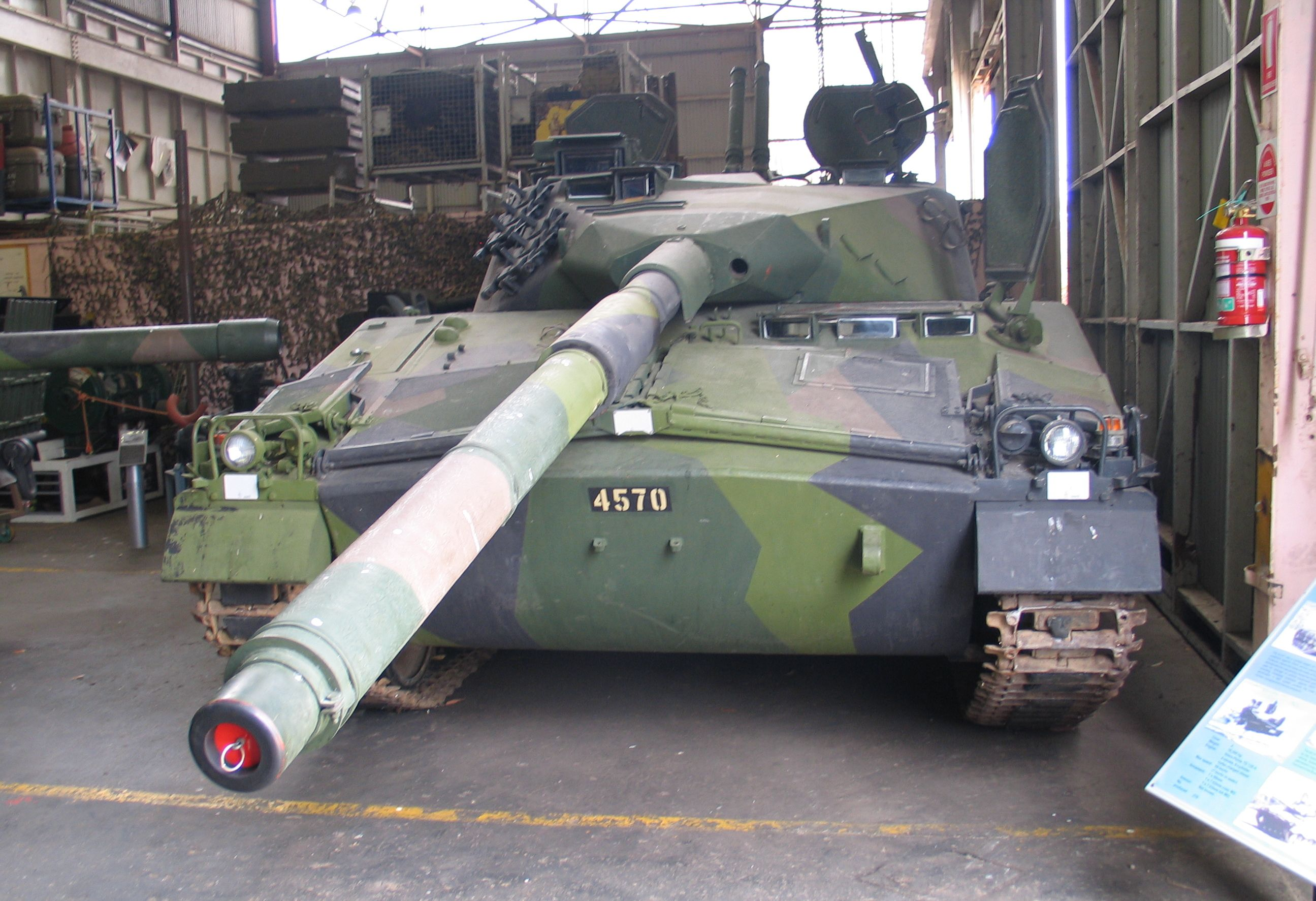
Infanterikanonvagn 91 Self-propelled Gun

== See also ==
- The Australian Armour and Artillery Museum
