= AC4 tank =

World War II Australian cruiser tank

Australian Cruiser Tank Mk. 4
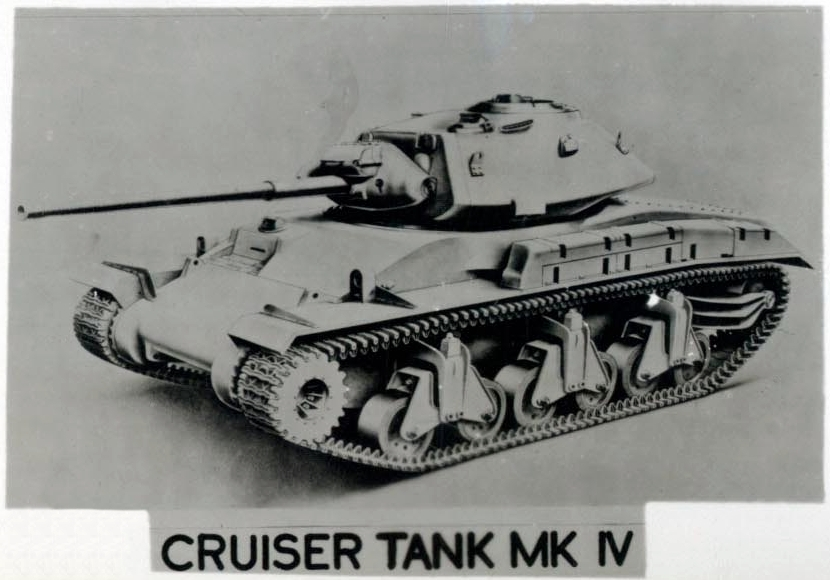
- [An AC4 tank illustration.] A 1943 artist's illustration of the AC MkIV tank based on the production drawings
- Type: Cruiser tank
- Place of origin: Australia

Production history
- Designed: 1943
- Manufacturer: New South Wales Government Railways

Specifications
- Mass: 30 long tons (30.5 t)
- Length: 21 feet 6 inches (6.55 m) (Maximum)
- Width: 9 feet (2.74 m) (Maximum)
- Height: 9 feet (2.74 m) (Maximum)
- Crew: 4 (Commander, Gunner, Loader/Operator, Driver)
- Armour: Hull front 2.5 inches (64 mm) sides and rear 1.75 inches (44 mm); Turret 2.5 inches (64 mm) all round
- Main armament: 17 pounder with 50-60 rounds, or 25 pounder tank gun
- Secondary armament: one .303 (7.7 mm) Vickers machine gun, 2,500-4000 rounds
- Engine: Perrier-Cadillac; 397 horsepower (296 kW)
- Power/weight: 13.2 hp/ton
- Suspension: Horizontal Volute Spring
- Operational range: 150 miles (240 km)
- Maximum speed: 30 miles per hour (48 km/h)

The AC4 (Australian Cruiser Tank Mk. 4) was a cruiser tank designed in Australia in World War II as the intended successor to the AC3 Thunderbolt. Like its predecessors the AC4 was to have a one piece cast hull and turret. The AC4's most important characteristic would be the use of a 17 pounder tank gun.

== History ==
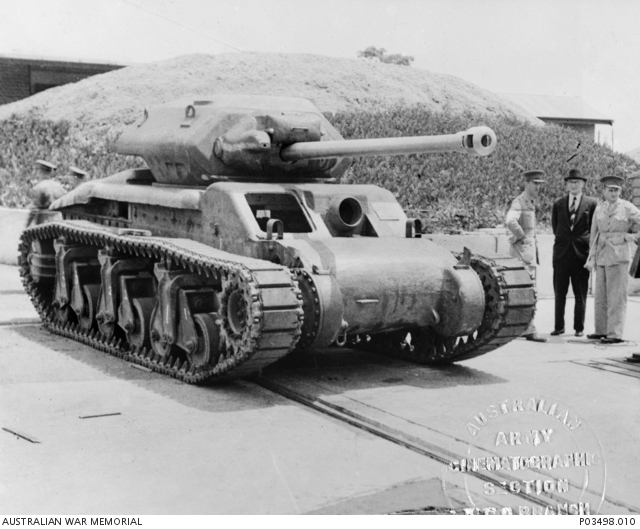
AC E1 development vehicle with a test turret and 17 pounder gun

Reservations about the utility of the 25 pounder in the AC3, and the 25 pounder's limited ability to pierce armour led to experimentation with a 17 pounder mounted on an Australian cruiser.

A turret was built and mounted on one of the earlier development vehicles to assess the vehicle's ability to mount the foremost Allied anti-tank gun of the day – the British 17 pounder (76 mm, 3 in). This was achieved by mounting two 25 pounder gun-howitzers which when fired together would significantly exceed the recoil of a 17 pounder. In this configuration the tank was tested on 2 November 1942. It fitted with a 17 pounder and after successful gunnery trials on 17 November 1942 the 17 pounder was selected for the AC4 design. For the AC4 the 17 pounder was to be mounted in a new and larger turret, attached by a 70-inch (1778 mm) diameter turret ring, the space for which was accommodated by changes to the upper hull permitted by the compact nature of the "Perrier-Cadillac".

A design for the tank had been established, however it was subject to a redesign to alter the internal stowage, and include new features not previously considered such as removal of the turret basket, addition of a gyro-stabiliser, and swapping a hydraulic traverse for the electrical system, and torsion bar suspension for the volute spring used up until that point.

The programme was authorised to build a total of 510 AC4 tanks. Of these 510 tanks, 110 were to be the "A" variant fitted with a 25 pounder tank gun instead of the 17 pounder. While the AC4 did not receive a formal name the Director of AFV Production, Alfred Code, had the name "Woomera" in mind for the tank. The design was not yet finalised when the programme was terminated in July 1943.

== Variants ==
- AC4A
  - one 25 pounder gun
  - one Vickers machine gun

== See also ==
Tanks of comparable role, performance, and era

- Australia Thunderbolt
- British Cromwell
- Canadian Grizzly I
- German Panzer IV
- Hungarian Turán III
- Italian Carro Armato P 40
- Japanese Type 3 Chi-Nu
- Soviet T-34
- Swedish Stridsvagn m/42
- United States M4 Sherman

== Notes ==
Footnotes

Citations
