= 1942 medium tank (Romania) =

Romanian medium tank project

1942 medium tank (Note: The project's real name is currently unknown. Thus, the vehicle is referred to here as "1942 medium tank", based on its classification and year of design.)
- Type: Medium tank
- Place of origin: Kingdom of Romania

Service history
- Wars: World War II

Production history
- Designed: 1942
- No. built: proposal

Specifications
- Mass: 16-18 tonnes
- Height: 2 m or less
- Crew: 4
- Armor: 40-60 mm
- Main armament: 1 x gun of 50 mm or higher caliber
- Secondary armament: 1 or 2 x machine guns
- Maximum speed: 50 km/h

In 1942, a medium tank was proposed to be produced by the Axis-aligned Kingdom of Romania. The reason behind the proposal was the lack of a Romanian-produced armored fighting vehicle capable of challenging enemy Soviet tanks on the Eastern Front, as well as the allied Nazi Germany not being capable of supplying Romania with considerable amounts of its own tanks. For these same reasons, Romania developed and produced the Mareșal tank destroyer, but the proposed medium tank never saw production.

== Background ==
From the moment the Romanians first encountered Soviet T-34 and KV-1 tanks in late 1941, it was obvious that not a single tank or gun in the Romanian inventory was able to tackle them on reasonable terms. Furthermore, the allied Germans were not prepared to supply such weapons as long as their own forces were short. By late 1942, apart from some Panzer IIIs and Panzer IVs, the Romanian army was only equipped with obsolete R-1, R-2 and R35 tanks. This led to different proposals to produce a Romanian vehicle capable to threaten Soviet ones; one such proposal was that of a medium tank.

== History ==
By the end of 1942, the Romanian Army Headquarters and the Third Army's leadership definitized a set of proposals regarding the production of a tank in Romania. They wanted to avoid producing a light tank, since such vehicles proved to be "an easy prey for the enemy". Thus, the proposed Romanian vehicle was to include elements comparable to those of German armor that were considered superior to those of Soviet tanks. The 1st Armored Regiment was asked for advice regarding the tank's characteristics.

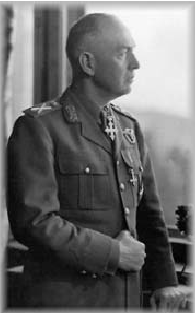
Ion Antonescu suggested a medium tank to be built in Romania

British historian Mark Axworthy states that the Romanians had planned to locally produce the Soviet T-34 with some gun technology changes incorporated from the German Panzer IV, and that wartime leader Ion Antonescu himself proposed this vehicle. However, an original Romanian medium tank was also proposed, whose characteristics were partially comparable to those of the aforementioned Soviet and German tanks: Its planned weight was of 16-18 tonnes; it should have been able to reach 50 km/h; the crew would have consisted of four members; the main gun was to have a caliber of 50 mm or higher; secondary armament would have consisted of one or two machine guns; its armor was to be 40-60 mm thick; and its height of 2 m or less.

The tank never went beyond the proposal stage. Instead, a number of tank destroyers were produced in Romania: the Mareșal, TACAM T-60, TACAM R-2 and VDC R35. According to Mark Axworthy, this was because of the Romanian industry not being able to produce a medium tank of such characteristics. The idea of producing a medium tank, however, was not at all a new concept in Romania. The first such proposal came in 1926 as an offer by the Reșița works to produce a British Vickers tank under license, weighing 10.5 tonnes and reaching 24 km/h (which indicates it was the Medium Mk. I). Later, in 1934, a study stated that "the production of a medium tank at the Reșița works is not out of question". During World War II, in 1940, Romania applied to Germany for a license to build a local version of the Škoda T-21 tank in 216 examples; this planned vehicle was designated R-3. Germany refused to provide the license, since Romania was not yet part of the Axis. Then, in May 1942, Germany again refused a Romanian request to locally build the Škoda T-23, since it would have required importing armor plate from the Škoda Works. Both of those Škoda tanks were in some ways similar to the 1942 medium tank project – they had weaker armor and armament, however.

The main gun model planned for use on this medium tank is not stated in any currently known source. During the war, the Romanian army possessed multiple anti-tank guns of the stated caliber (50 mm or higher), such as the 75 mm Reșița M1943, the 76 mm ZiS-3 or the 76 mm F-22 guns (all of which were used on the above-mentioned Romanian tank destroyers).

== See also ==
=== Vehicles comparable in characteristics ===
- American M4 Sherman
- Argentine Nahuel DL 43
- Australian Sentinel
- Australian Thunderbolt
- British Cromwell
- Canadian Ram
- French Char G1
- German Panzer III
- German Panzer IV
- Hungarian Turán
- Italian P26/40
- Italian P43
- Japanese Type 3 Chi-Nu
- Soviet T-34
- Swedish Strv m/42

== Bibliography ==
- Axworthy, Mark (1995). Third Axis Fourth Ally: Romanian Armed Forces in the European War, 1941-1945. London: Arms and Armour. ISBN 9781854092670.
- Moșneagu, Marian [in Romanian]; Boțoghină, Iulian-Stelian; Manolescu, Mariana-Daniela; Stoica, Leontin-Vasile; Șoitariu, Mihai-Cosmin (2012). Armata română și evoluția armei tancuri. Documente (1919–1945) (PDF) (in Romanian). Pitești, Romania: Editura Universității de Stat din Pitești. ISBN 978-606-560-252-6. Archived from the original (PDF) on 2021-01-19.
- Scafeș, Cornel (2004). "Buletinul Muzeului Național Militar, Nr. 2/2004" [Bulletin of the National Military Museum, No. 2/2004]. National Military Museum (in Romanian). Bucharest: Total Publishing: 210–237.
- Scafeș, Cornel; Șerbănescu, Horia Vl.; Scafeș, Ioan I. (2011) [2005]. Trupele blindate din Armata Română (1919-1947) – Organizare, echipament, armament (in Romanian). Bucharest: Alpha MDN. ISBN 9789731390741.
- Stroea, Adrian; Băjenaru, Gheorghe (2010). Artileria română în date și imagini (PDF) (in Romanian). Bucharest: Editura Centrului Tehnic-Editorial al Armatei. ISBN 9786065240803.
- Zaloga, Steven J. (2013). Tanks of Hitler's Eastern Allies 1941-45. Oxford, UK: Osprey Publishing. ISBN 978-1-78096-020-3.
