= Stridsvagn 74 =

Swedish light tank used from 1958 to 1984

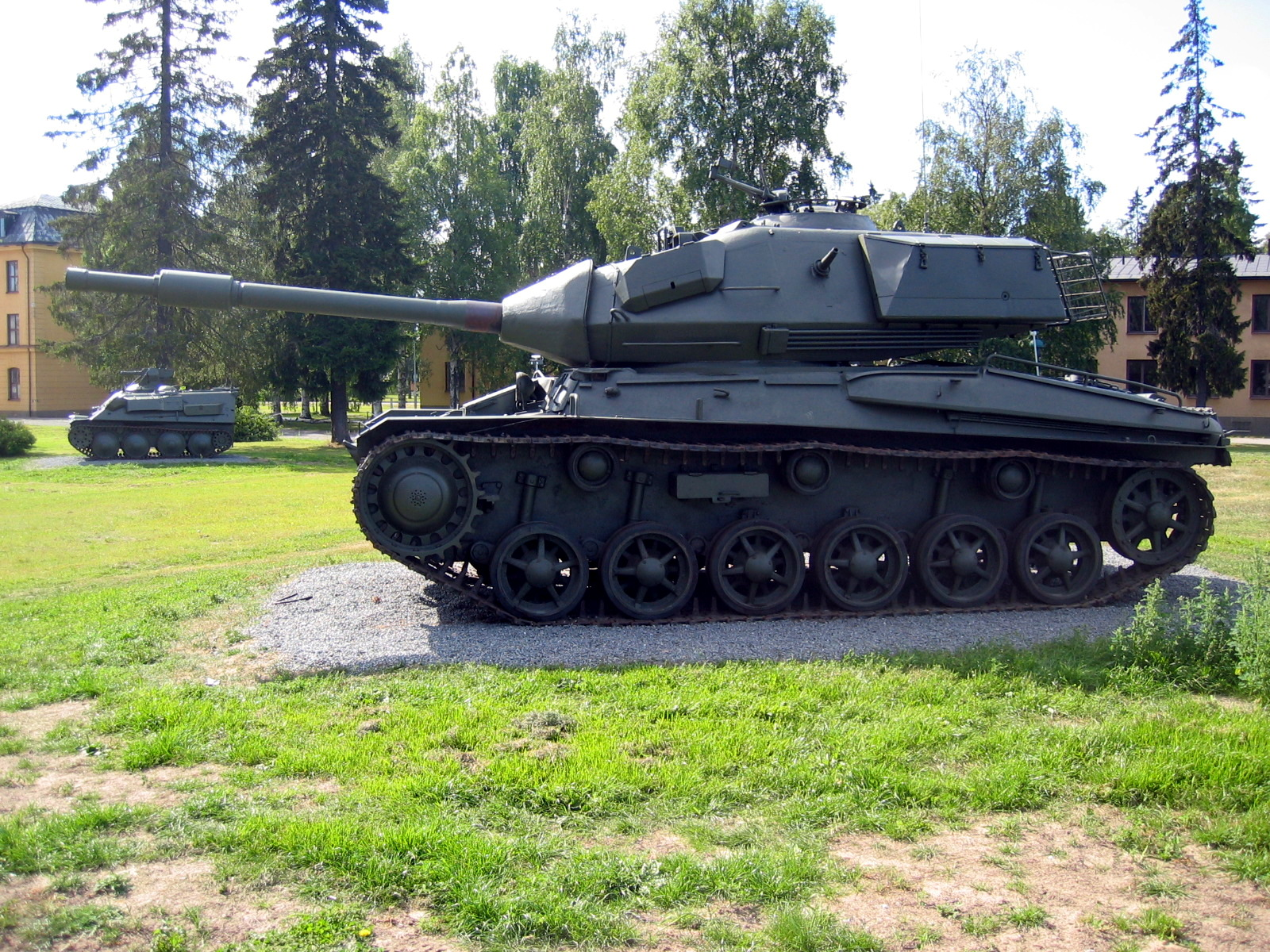
- Strv 74 at the military history museum in Boden.
- Type: Light tank
- Place of origin: Sweden

Service history
- In service: 1958–1984

Production history
- Unit cost: c:a 360 000:- SEK (1960 value)
- Produced: 1958-1960
- No. built: 225
- Variants: 74 H, 74 V

Specifications
- Mass: 26 t (29 short tons; 26 long tons)
- Length: 6.08 m (19 ft 11 in); 7.93 m (26 ft 0 in) (including gun)
- Width: 2.43 m (8 ft 0 in)
- Height: 3.30 m (10 ft 10 in)
- Crew: 4 (commander, driver, gunner, loader)
- Armor: 9–55 mm (0.35–2.17 in)
- Main armament: Bofors 75 mm Model 1929
- Secondary armament: 2×8 mm ksp m/39 strv
- Engine: Gasoline, 2×Scania-Vabis L/603; 170 hp (127 kW) each
- Power/weight: 13.08 hp/tonne
- Suspension: Torsion beam suspension
- Ground clearance: 0.40 m
- Operational range: 200 km (120 mi)
- Maximum speed: 45 km/h (28 mph)

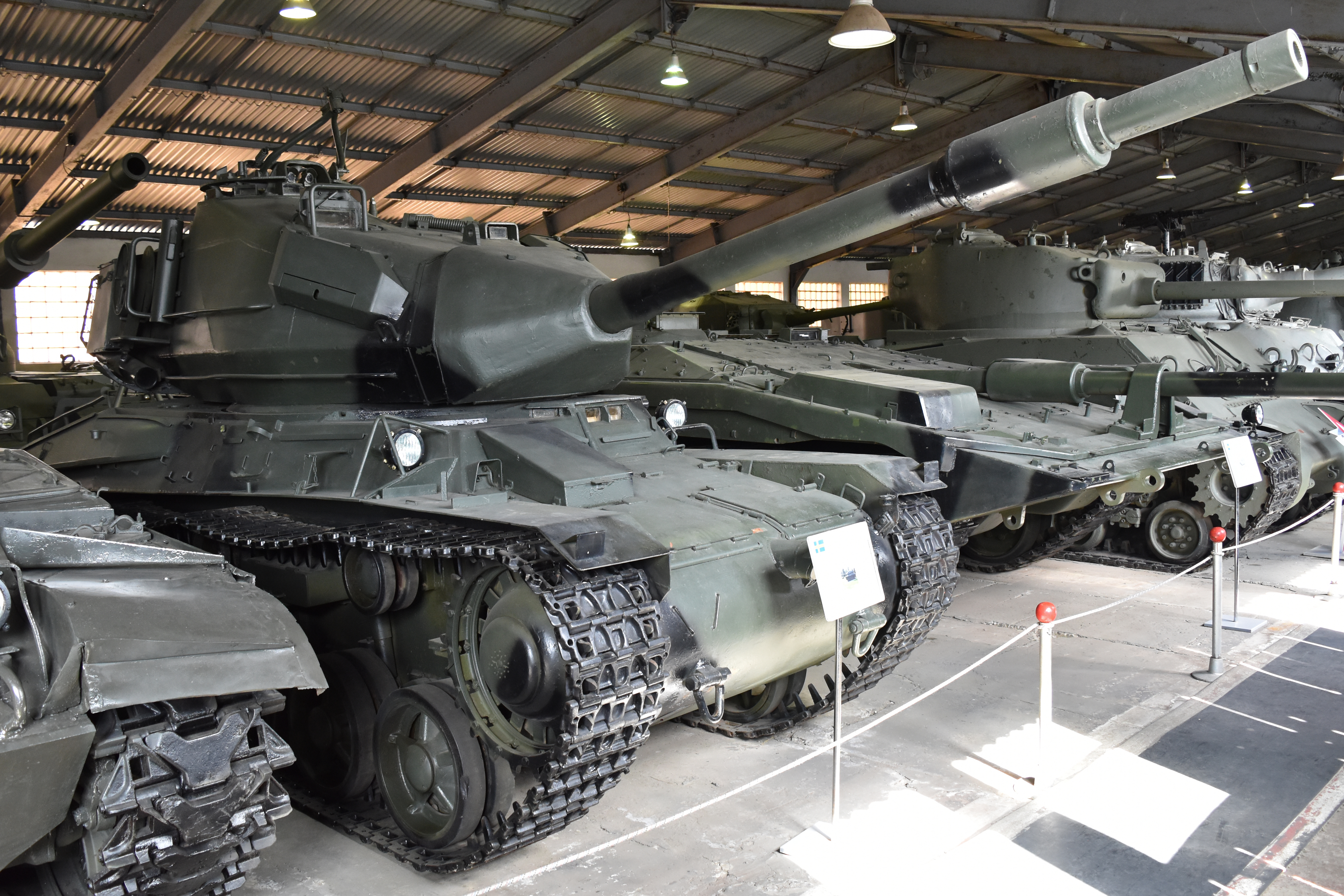
a Strv 74 at the Kubinka Tank Museum next to a Stridsvagn 103

Stridsvagn 74 (strv 74) is a Swedish light tank in use with the Swedish Army from 1958 to 1984. It was a modification of the older stridsvagn m/42 medium tank, which was phased out of service in the early 1950s. Instead of scrapping the vehicles altogether, the chassis were used to build a new tank that could be used as a supplement to the newly bought stridsvagn 81. The turret of the strv 74 was completely new, with a 75 mm high-velocity gun based on an older anti-aircraft gun, the Bofors 75 mm Model 1929, engines and transmission were modified or changed from the strv m/42, wider tracks and a separate electrical motor for turret traverse was introduced while retaining manual traverse as a backup.

== History ==
Stridsvagn 74's development path stretches through the stridsvagn m/40 and m/42 to the original 16,257 kg/16-ton Lago tank, manufactured by the Swedish firm Landsverk for the Hungarian Army. The 74 was therefore in essence a modernized version of the World War II strv m/42 tank which was itself an attempt to bring Swedish-produced tanks up to the standard of the rest of war-torn Europe. It was most successful in this role.

Produced in 1958, weighing 26,000 kilograms (29 short tons; 26 long tons) and powered by two Scania-Vabis L/607 (170 hp/127 kW each) gasoline engines, the stridsvagn 74 had a top speed of 45 kilometers per hour (28 miles per hour), and a range of 200 km/124.3 miles. With a crew of four, it mounted a 75mm/2.95in main gun and had two machine-guns in its updated turret, which was later further modified with a more sophisticated fire-control type system and an upgrading of the main armament to increase its velocity.

== Use ==
Stridsvagn 74 was used in the Swedish Army armoured brigades as a replacement for the cancelled purchase of AMX-13 until it was replaced by strv 103. It was then used in independent corps tank companies, and even later relegated to the infantry support role in assault gun companies before being phased out of service in 1981 (strv 74 V) and 1984 (strv 74 H). The turrets were retained and later used as static gun pillboxes, which were phased out and demolished in the early 2000s.

Its high silhouette and narrow hull along with the recoil of the gun made it rock when firing the gun at 3 and 9 o´clock and it was sometimes referred as "Sanslös" (Swedish for "Senseless") by its crew.

== Versions ==
Strv 74 was available in two almost identical versions, strv 74 H and strv 74 V, the main difference being the transmission, which lead to slightly different interior layouts. The H version was based on the strv m/42 TH, and the V version was based on the strv m/42 TV.

== Gallery ==
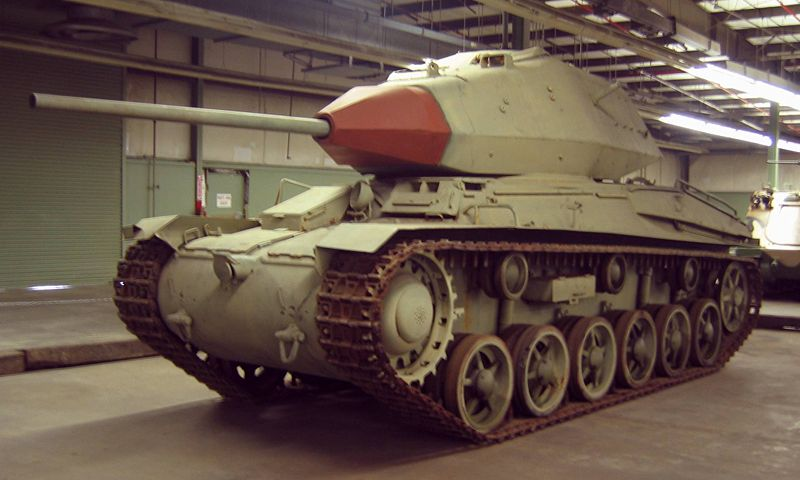
Strv 74 at the American Armored Foundation Museum in Danville, Virginia.

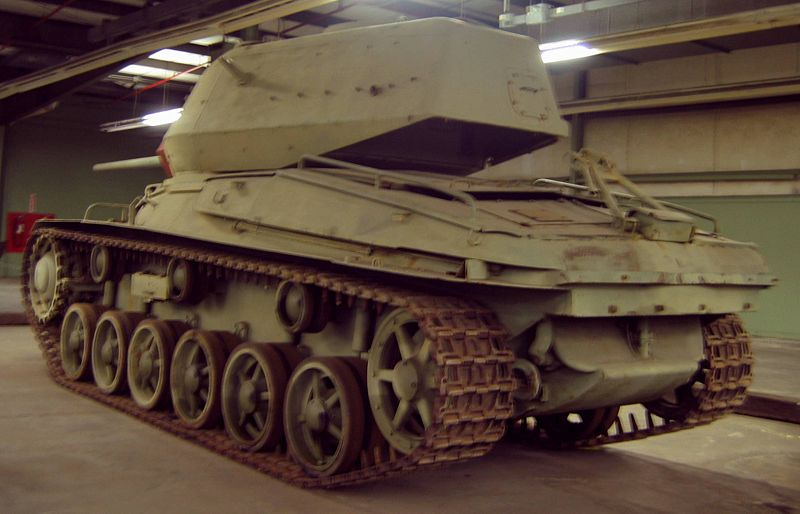
Rear view of strv 74 at the AAF Museum.
