= Nahuel DL 43 =

Argentine tank developed during World War II

Nahuel DL-43
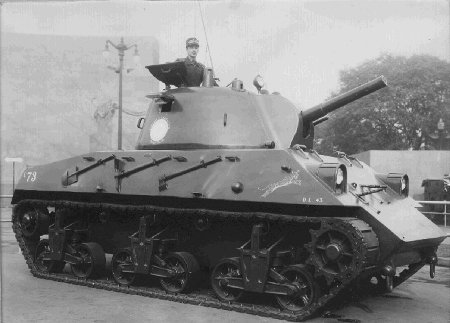
- Argentine Nahuel DL-43 tank
- Type: Medium tank
- Place of origin: Argentina

Service history
- Used by: Argentina

Production history
- Designer: Alfredo Baisi
- Manufacturer: Arsenal Esteban de Luca
- No. built: 12 (+ 1 wooden mock-up)

Specifications
- Mass: 35 tonnes
- Length: 6.22 m (20 ft 5 in)
- Width: 2.33 m (7 ft 8 in)
- Height: 2.952 m (9 ft 8.2 in)
- Crew: 5 (Commander, gunner, loader, driver, co-driver)
- Armor: 80 mm
- Main armament: Krupp 7.5 cm Model 1909
- Secondary armament: 1× 7.65 mm Allan machine gun and 3 x 7.65 mm Madsen machine guns ?? rounds
- Engine: FMA-Lorraine-Dietrich 12 Eb, 12 cylinders in W, water cooled 500 hp
- Power/weight: 14.3 hp / tonne
- Suspension: vertical volute spring
- Operational range: 250 km (on road)
- Maximum speed: 25 mph (40 km/h) (on road)

The Nahuel DL-43 tank was a medium tank developed in Argentina during World War II. It was the Argentine equivalent of the M4 Sherman and the M3 Grant American medium tanks.

== Design ==
The designer was Lt. Colonel Alfredo Baisi. The word Nahuel means "jaguar" in the aboriginal language Mapudungun. It was armed with a 75 mm gun (taken from the Krupp Model 1909 Field Gun used by the Argentine Army) in a rotating armored turret.

Its design is similar to that of the United States Army M4 Medium and the early versions of the M3 Grant but with sloped armor. Contrary to popular belief it was not a copy of the M4 Sherman, but the design of the M4 influenced it.

== Production ==
Only 12 tanks and one wooden mock-up were produced by the Arsenal Esteban de Luca in Buenos Aires and supplied to the Argentine Army, because of the availability of cheap surplus Sherman tanks, several of which were provided by Belgium and the United Kingdom in the late 1940s.

No examples of Nahuel tanks survive to this day.

== Operators ==
- (Argentina) Argentine Army

== See also ==
- Argentina during World War II
- Ñandú (vehicle)
- TAM (tank)
- Patagón

=== Comparable tanks ===
- British Cromwell
- Canadian Grizzly I
- German Panzer III
- German Panzer IV
- Hungarian Turán III
- Italian Carro Armato P 40
- Italian P43 (proposal)
- Japanese Type 3 Chi-Nu
- Romanian 1942 medium tank (proposal)
- Swedish Stridsvagn m/42
- American M4 Sherman
