= Rover light armoured car =

Australian armoured car

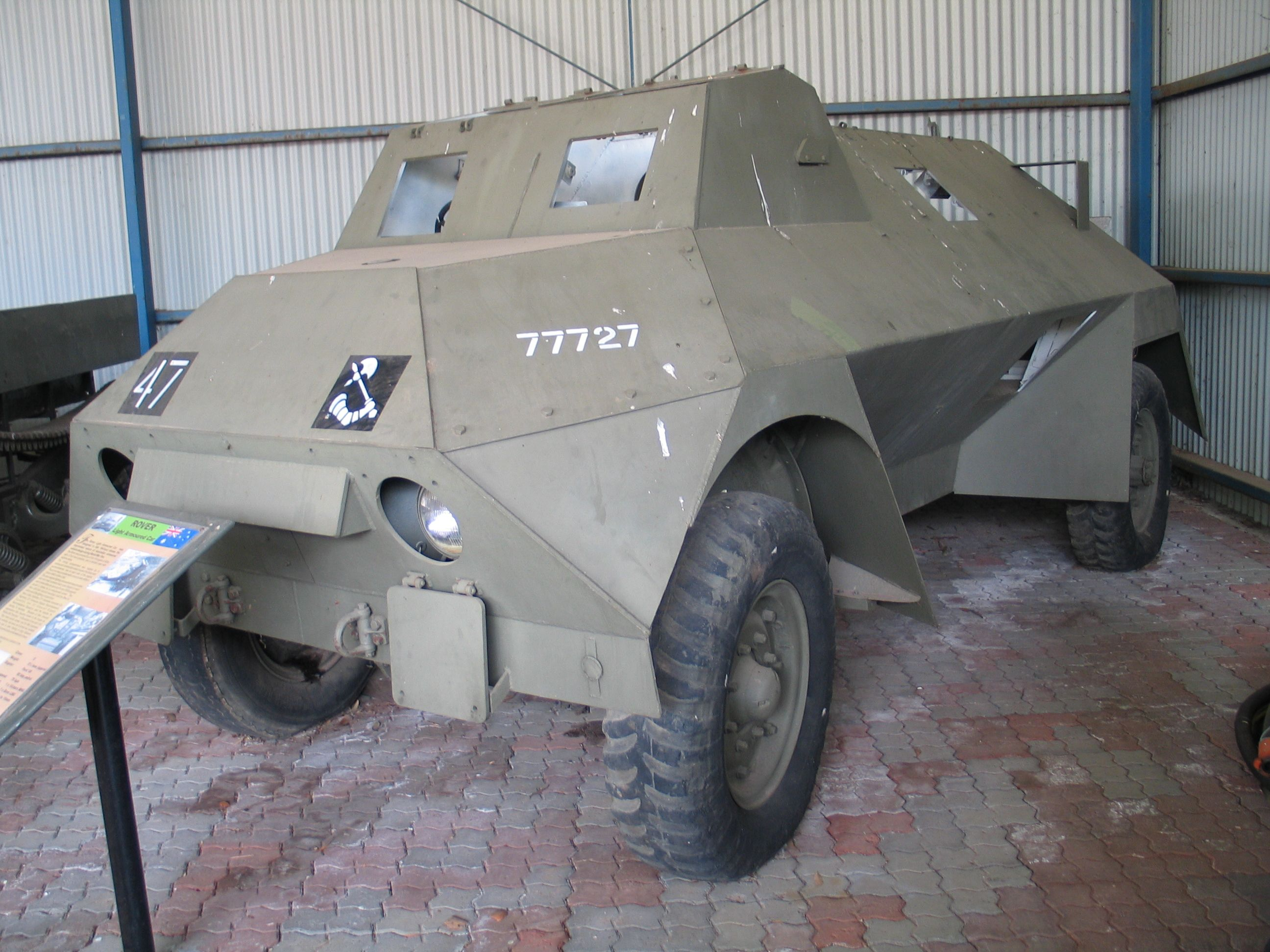
- Rover Mk 2 Light Armoured Car in Royal Australian Armoured Corps Tank Museum, Puckapunyal, Victoria, Australia.
- Type: Armoured car
- Place of origin: Australia

Specifications
- Mass: Mk1 5.2 tonnes, Mk2 5 tonnes
- Length: Mk1 6.1 m (20 ft 0 in); Mk2 5.6 m (18 ft 4 in)
- Width: 2.3 m (7 ft 7 in)
- Height: 2.1 m (6 ft 11 in)
- Crew: 5 (Commander, Driver, 2 Gunners, Wireless operator)
- Armour: 16 mm
- Main armament: 0.303 Vickers machine gun
- Secondary armament: 0.303 Bren LMG
- Engine: Ford V8; 95 hp (71 kW)
- Power/weight: 19 hp/tonne (14.2 kW/tonne)
- Suspension: 4×4, leaf spring

The Rover light armoured car, designated Light Armoured Car (Aust), was an armoured car produced in Australia during the Second World War.

== History and description ==
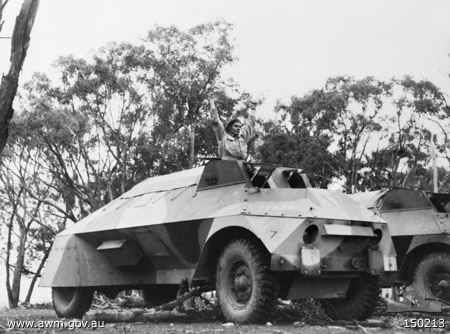
A Mark 1 light armoured car in 1942

At the outbreak of the Second World War, the United Kingdom was unable to meet the needs of the Commonwealth for armoured fighting vehicles. This led many Commonwealth countries to develop their own AFVs.

The Rover was designed in 1941. It used Ford 3-ton Canadian Military Pattern truck chassis, either F60L or the shorter F60S. The armoured bodies were produced by Ruskin Motor Bodies of Melbourne. The production was stopped in 1943, a total of 238 cars were built.

The Rover entered service with the Australian Army in April 1942. It never saw combat and was used mostly for crew training. A long narrow opening at the top of the hull earned the vehicle a nickname: "mobile slit trench". Late in 1943 Australia started to receive US-made armoured cars and the Rover was soon declared obsolete.

There are three restored Rover Mk II cars on display in Australian museums: at the National Military Vehicle Museum in Edinburgh Parks in South Australia; at the Royal Australian Armoured Corps Tank Museum in Puckapunyal, Victoria; and at the Australian Armour and Artillery Museum in Cairns, Queensland.

== Variants ==
The Rover was produced in two variants, with Mk II vehicles being built on shorter wheelbases in order to reduce weight.

Variant	Chassis	Weight	Produced
Mk I	F60L	5.2 tons	40
Mk II	F60S	5 tons	198
