= Thunderbolt tank =

Australian cruiser tank

Australian Cruiser Tank Mk. 3 "Thunderbolt"
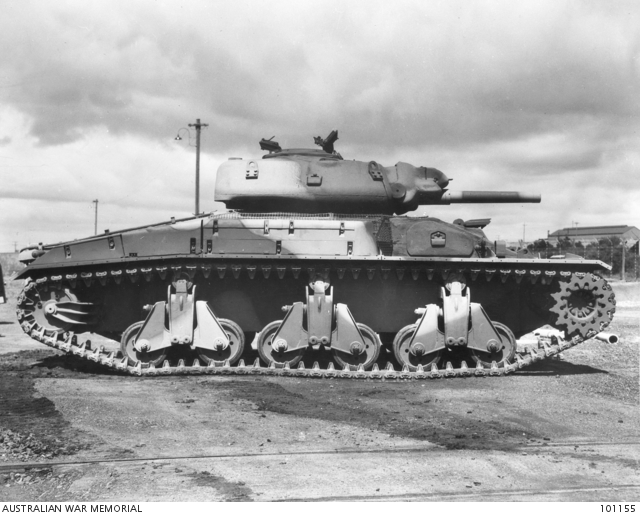
- The pilot production AC MkIII tank
- Type: Cruiser tank
- Place of origin: Australia

Production history
- Designed: 1942
- Manufacturer: New South Wales Government Railways Workshops
- Produced: 1943
- No. built: 1

Specifications
- Mass: 29 long tons (29.5 t)
- Length: 20 feet 9 inches (6.32 m)
- Width: 9 feet 7/8 inch (2.77 m)
- Height: 8 feet 4 3/4 inches (2.56 m)
- Crew: 4 (Commander, Gunner, Loader/Operator, Driver)
- Armour: Hull front 65 millimetres (2.6 in) sides and rear 45 millimetres (1.8 in); Turret 65 millimetres (2.6 in) all round
- Main armament: 25 pounder tank gun, 120 rounds
- Secondary armament: One .303 (7.7 mm) Vickers machine gun, 2,500 rounds
- Engine: Perrier-Cadillac; 397 horsepower (296 kW)
- Power/weight: 13.7 hp/ton
- Suspension: Horizontal Volute Spring
- Operational range: 200 miles (320 km)
- Maximum speed: 35 miles per hour (56 km/h)

AC3 Thunderbolt (Australian Cruiser III) was a cruiser tank designed and built in Australia in World War II as the successor to the AC1 Sentinel. Like the Sentinel the AC3 featured a one piece cast hull and turret. The AC3 featured a much improved design over the AC1 with better armour protection, a more powerful engine, and most importantly increased firepower.

The program was terminated in 1943 before any production vehicles were completed.

== History ==
Even before the AC1 Sentinel began rolling off the assembly line in August 1942 it had been seen that the 2 pounder was becoming less effective as tank armour increased in thickness on new and improved enemy tanks. To address this a 25 pounder (87.6 mm, 3.45 in) gun-howitzer was fitted to a turret on the second prototype Australian cruiser tank hull and successfully test fired on 29 June 1942. It was therefore decided to use the 25 pounder as a tank gun. The 25 pounder, redesigned as a tank gun, was tested on 10 October 1942, the work on the overhead recoil system would later prove useful for the design of the Short 25 Pounder.

Mounted in a fully traversable turret larger than that of the AC1 but using the same 54 in (1.4 m) turret ring, it was slightly cramped for the turret crew but gave the AC3 both armour-piercing capability as well as an effective high explosive round. The 40 volt electrical turret traverse system of the AC1 was replaced by a more powerful 110 volt system.

The hull machine gun and gunner were removed from the design to make room for stowage of the larger 25 pounder ammunition. Powered by the same three Cadillac V8 engines as the AC1, they were now mounted radially on a common crank case and geared together to form the "Perrier-Cadillac", (Note: Named after the French engineer Robert Perrier who was largely responsible for the design) a single 17.1 L, 24 cylinder engine, very similar in some respects to the later A57 Chrysler multibank used in some variants of the US M3 and M4 tanks. While the AC3 shared the same armour basis as the AC1, the hull profile had been greatly redesigned to improve the ballistic shape.

The programme was authorised to build a total of 200 Thunderbolts. Although only one pilot model AC3 had been completed, large scale production of components had been ordered and 150 AC3 hulls cast. New South Wales Government Railways' production line at Chullora work had started on assembling the first 25 AC3 tanks for trials when the programme was terminated in July 1943.

== Survivors ==
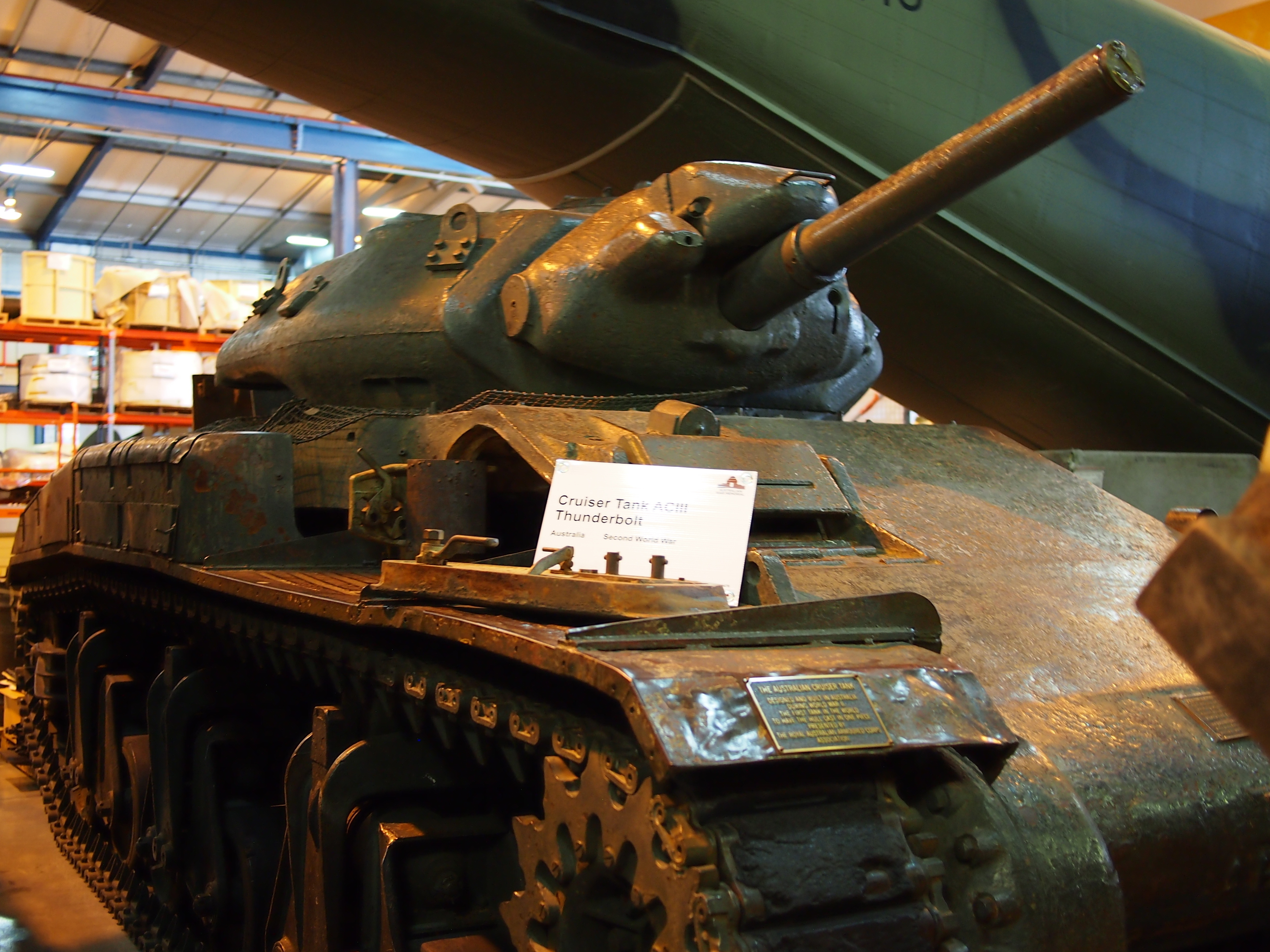
The Australian War Memorial's AC3 in 2013

At the end of World War II all but three Australian Cruiser tanks were disposed of by the Australian government. (Note: Some sources state that the Sentinels were used for training after the cancellation of the program, and were not declared obsolete by the Australian Army for this purpose until 1956 eg the official history and Bingham. However, Koudstaal states that the Sentinels were too different to the M3s and Matildas to be used for training and would require modifications and the manufacture of spares if they were to be used as special purpose vehicles. In 1945, three had been selected for preservation in war museums, while the remainder were dismantled.) The 65 tanks that were not required to serve as a physical record in war museums in Australia and the UK were sold off by the Commonwealth Disposals Commission. One of the three saved was the only completed AC3 (serial number 8066) which is now located at the Treloar Resource Centre at the Australian War Memorial in Canberra.

An AC3 mockup was assembled from unused AC3 armour castings and a mix of AC3 and AC1 parts at the Melbourne Tank Museum in 1996–97, this piece was sold to a private collector in 2006.

== Variants ==
- AC IIIA - A tentative design with the turret ring increased to 70 inches (1.8 m).

== See also ==
Tanks of comparable role, performance, and era

- Australian Sentinel
- British Cromwell
- Canadian Ram II
- German Panzer IV
- Hungarian Turán III
- Italian Carro Armato P 40
- Italian P43 (proposal)
- Japanese Type 3 Chi-Nu
- Romanian 1942 medium tank (proposal)
- Soviet T-34
- Swedish Stridsvagn m/42
- United States M4 Sherman

== Notes ==
Footnotes

Citations
