= Stridsvagn m/42 =

Swedish medium tank

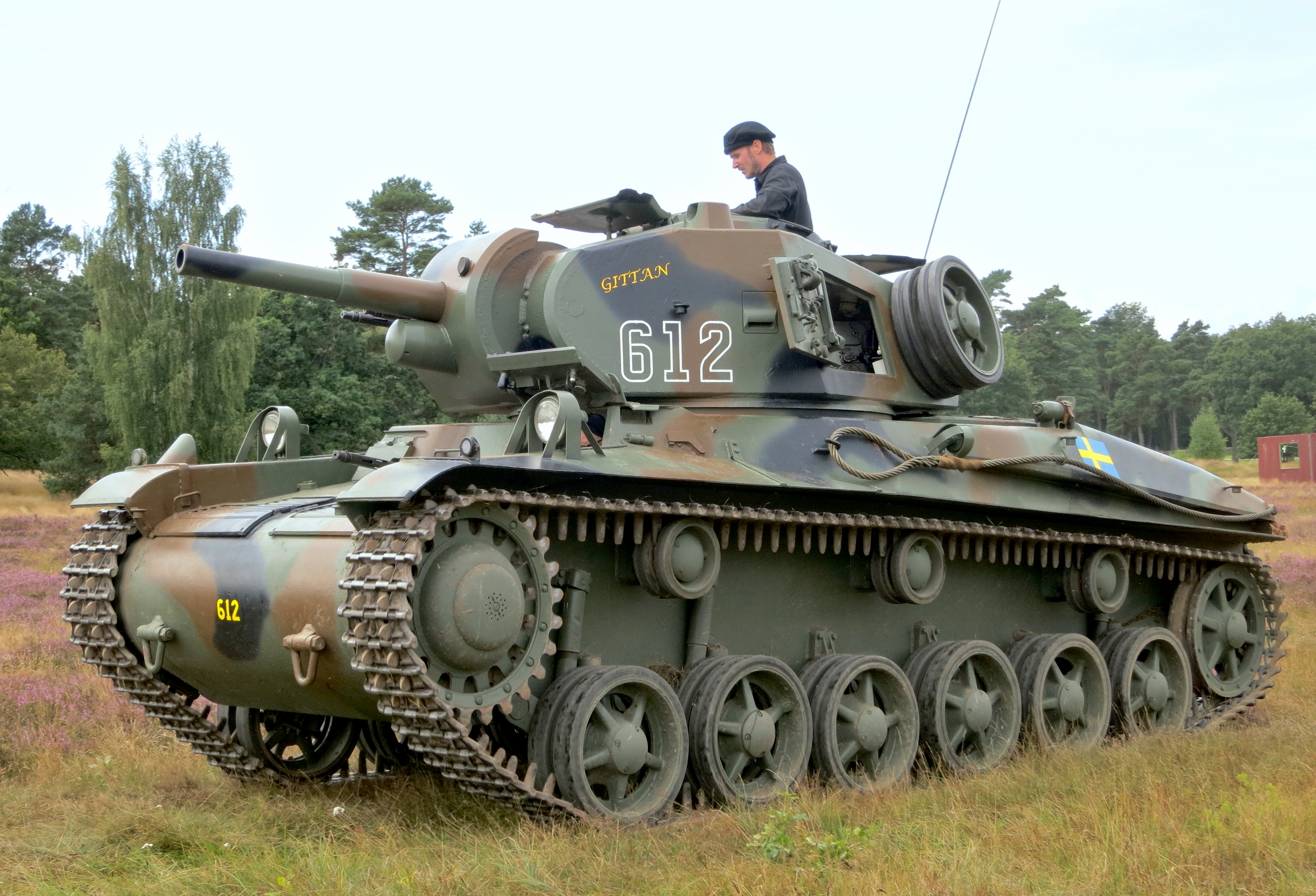
- Stridsvagn m/42 (1943)
- Type: Medium tank
- Place of origin: Sweden

Service history
- Used by: Sweden

Production history
- Designer: AB Landsverk
- Designed: November 1941
- Manufacturer: AB Landsverk, Volvo
- Produced: April 1943–January 1945
- No. built: 282
- Variants: Strv m/42 TM (1943–44); Strv m/42 TH (1944); Strv m/42 EH (1944–45); Strv m/42 TV (1948); Infanterikanonvagn 73 (Ikv 73) (1957–60); Strv 74 (1957–60)

Specifications (Strv m/42)
- Mass: 22.3–22.5 t (24.6–24.8 short tons; 21.9–22.1 long tons)
- Length: TH: 6.215 m (20 ft 4.7 in); EH: 6.22 m (20 ft 5 in)
- Width: 2.34 m (7 ft 8 in)
- Height: 2.585 m (8 ft 5.8 in)
- Crew: 4
- Armor: 9–55 mm (0.35–2.17 in)
- Main armament: 75 mm m/41 gun L/31
- Secondary armament: 4× 8 mm m/39 machine guns
- Engine: TM, TH & TV: 2× Scania-Vabis L/603/1; EH: 1× Volvo A8B; TM, TH & TV: 324 hp EH: 380 hp
- Power/weight: TM & TH: 14,5 hp/ton EH: 16,9 hp/ton
- Transmission: TM: ZF 6-speed electromagnetic TH: 2x Atlas-Diesel DF-1,0; Atlas-Diesel TER-1/1,81; EH: Atlas-Diesel DF-1,15 S Atlas-Diesel TER-1/1,67; TV: Landsverk S-8082 + Volvo VL 420
- Suspension: Torsion bar
- Maximum speed: 42–45 km/h (26–28 mph)

Stridsvagn m/42 (Strv m/42) was a Swedish medium tank in service in the World War II period. Known by its manufacturer AB Landsverk as Lago II-III-IV, it fielded a 75 mm L/31 gun, the first of its size in a Swedish tank. It entered service with the Swedish Army in April 1943. Modern in design and mobile, a total of 282 were produced.

As a neutral nation in World War II, Sweden did not engage in combat; thus its tanks have no battlefield record.

== Design history ==
The Strv m/42 had its origins on modifications to the Lago (the manufacturer designation) a 16-tonne (16-long-ton) light tank armed with a Hungarian 37M 40 mm cannon and three machine guns produced for the Hungarian Army in late 1930s by AB Landsverk, itself a development of the Stridsvagn L-60 light tank also made by Landsverk. The Swedish Army specified for a bigger and better tank than the Lago, resulting in the Strv m/42 (later known as Strv m/42 TM), a 22-tonne (22-long-ton) tank armed with a 75mm L/31 gun, suited against armored and soft vehicles. The gearbox of the m/42 TM was not working well and these tanks were rebuilt either as the m/42 TH, or they got a new mechanical gearbox and became known as the m/42 TV.

== Production history ==
In November 1941, 100 Strv m/42s were ordered. All the vehicles had an electromagnetic gearbox. (Strv m/42 TM, the T meaning two engines and the M meaning electromagnetic gearbox). In January 1942 another 60 Strv m/42s were ordered. This batch was built under license by Volvo, the first 55 vehicles were fitted with twin Scania-Vabis L/603 engines and the remaining five were equipped with a new engine, the Volvo A8B. All the vehicles had the first batch electromagnetic gearbox replaced by a new hydraulic gearbox, with all these modifications, the single-engine vehicles were now designated as Strv m/42 EH, (the E meaning one engine and the H meaning hydraulic gearbox), the dual-engines tanks but with the new transmission were designated as Strv m/42 TH. In June 1942 another 80 were ordered from Landsverk, they were 70 m/42 TH and 10 m/42 EH.

Between April 1943 to January 1945, 282 Strv m/42s were delivered, of which 180 tanks were made at Landsverk and 102 at Volvo. Most of the vehicles, 225 vehicles, were fitted with Scania engines. The other 57 tanks got Volvo engines. All of the 225 Strv m/42 TH and m/42 TV produced (all strv m/42 with twin Scania-Vabis L/603 engines), were rebuilt between 1957 and 1960 to Stridsvagn 74 tanks and the EH vehicles (strv m/42 with single Volvo engine A8B engines) to Infanterikanonvagn 73 infantry support vehicles. The turrets were reused as static gun pillboxes, along the major coastlines, but mostly defending harbours and more seldom airfields.

== Variants ==
Strv m/42 was originally ordered in four versions in three configurations:

- Strv m/42 TM (Lago II) had two Scania-Vabis L/603 engines and a ZF electromagnetic gearbox. Made in 1943-44.
- Strv m/42 TH (Lago III), had two Scania-Vabis L/603 engines, each with an Atlas Diesel hydraulic gearbox. Made in 1944.
- Strv m/42 EH (Lago IV) had a single Volvo A8B engine and an Atlas Diesel hydraulic gearbox. Made in 1944-45.
- Strv m/42 TV had two Scania-Vabis L/603 engines with a Volvo mechanical gearbox. Made in 1948.

== Service ==
The Strv m/42 was issued to the following armored regiments:

- P 1/Enköping - Gotland stridsvagnskompani (English: Gotland tank company),
- P 2/Helsingborg,
- P 3/Strängnäs,
- P 4/Skövde: where the tanks were included in the newly formed tank companies.

The Strv m/42s were employed in the heavy tank companies of the armored brigades. They were phased out of active service in the 1950s and replaced by the Stridsvagn 81.

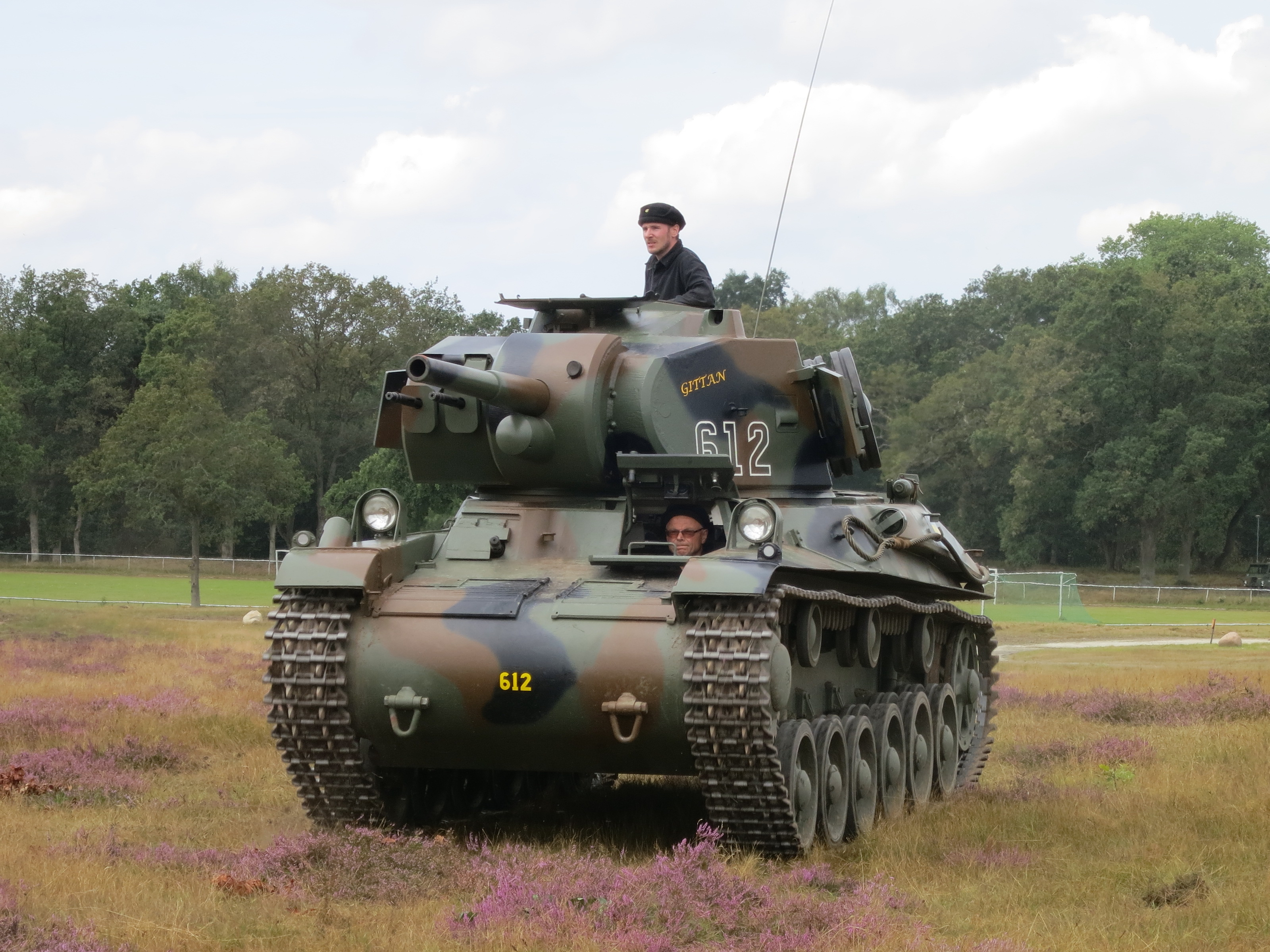
Stridsvagn m/42 in working condition

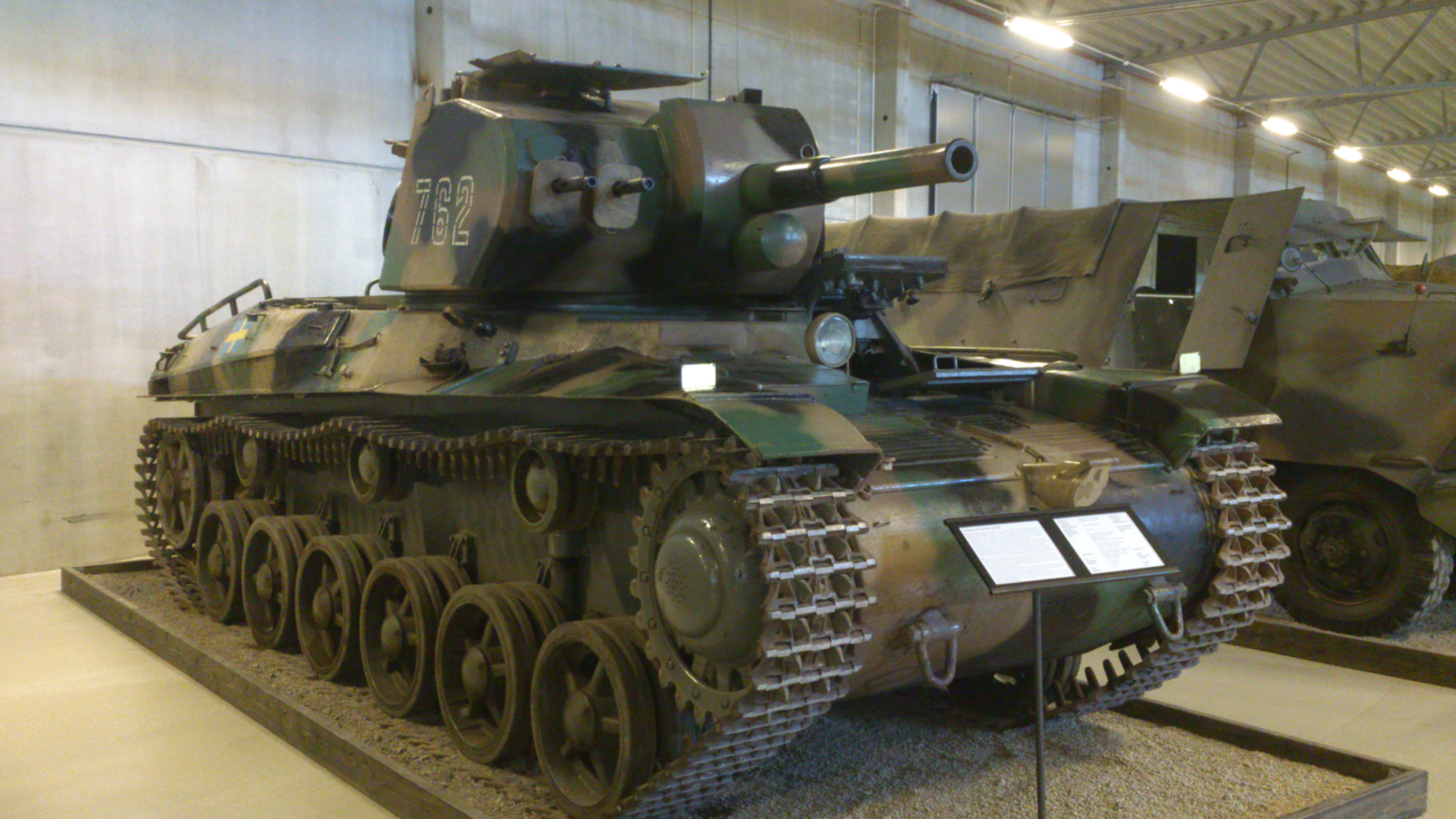
Stridsvagn m/42 at the Swedish Tank Museum Arsenalen

== See also ==
Tanks of comparable role, performance and era

- Argentine Nahuel DL 43
- Australian Sentinel
- British Cromwell
- Canadian Ram II
- German Panzer IV
- French SOMUA S40
- French SARL 42 (proposal)
- Hungarian Turán III
- Italian Carro Armato P 40
- Italian P43 (proposal)
- Japanese Type 3 Chi-Nu
- Romanian 1942 medium tank (proposal)
- Soviet T-34
- United States M4 Sherman
