= Cromwell tank =

British WWII cruiser tank

Tank, Cruiser, Mk VIII, Cromwell (A27M)
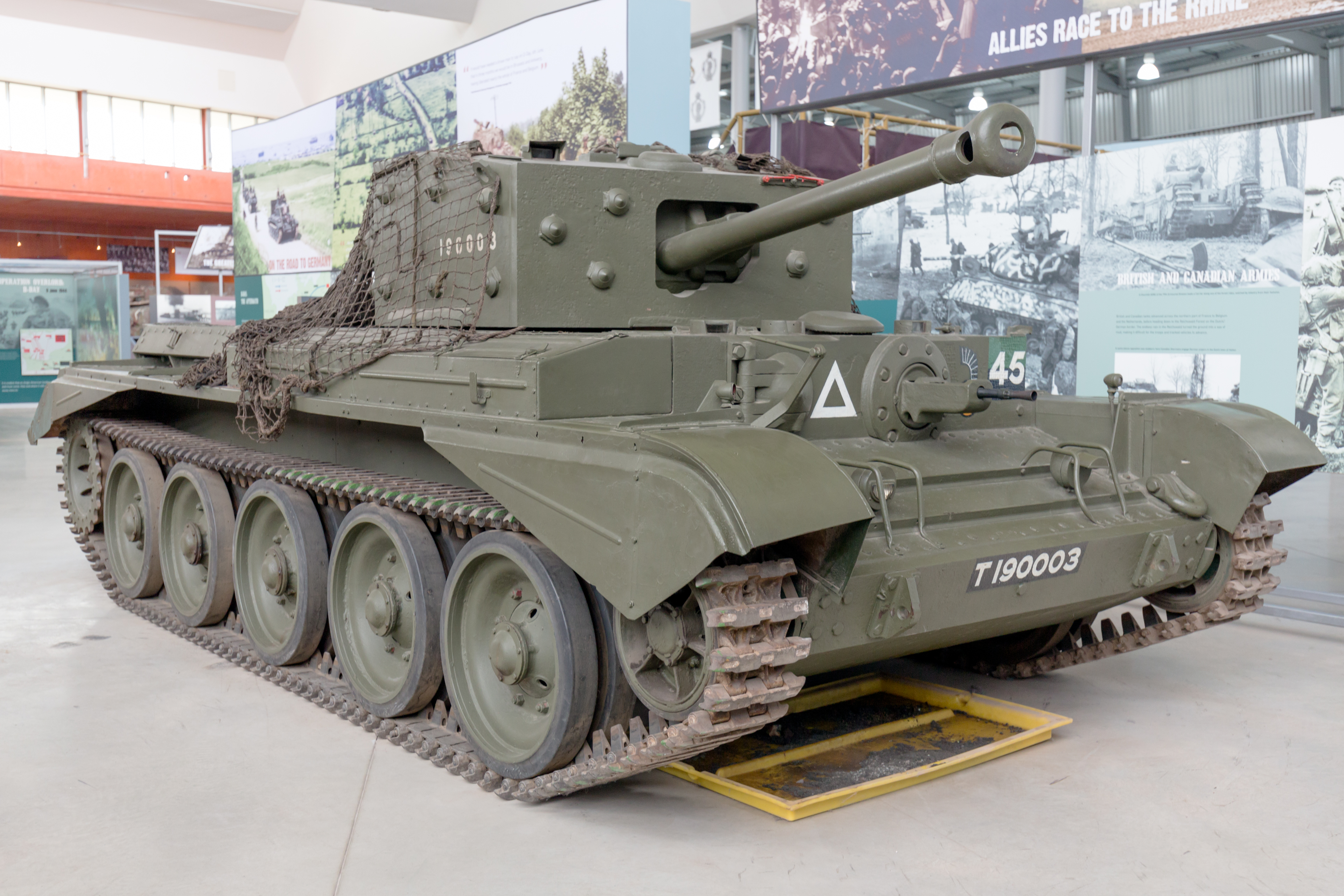
- A Cromwell IV at the Bovington Tank Museum
- Type: Cruiser tank
- Place of origin: United Kingdom

Service history
- In service: 1944–1955
- Used by: British Army, Israeli Army, Greek Army, Portuguese Army
- Wars: World War II, 1948 Arab–Israeli War, Korean War

Production history
- Designer: Leyland, then Birmingham Railway Carriage and Wagon Company from 1942
- Manufacturer: London, Midland and Scottish Railway, English Electric, Leyland Motors, Morris Motors
- Unit cost: £10,000 (Note: It was stated in the House of Commons in 1952 that in 1945 a Cromwell tank cost £10,000. This figure was a 1941 estimate of the basic price of a Cromwell tank, a type of tank that went into production in January 1943.)
- No. built: 4,016

Specifications
- Mass: 27.6 long tons (28.0 t)
- Length: 20 ft 10 in (6.35 m)
- Width: 9 ft 6 1/2 in (2.908 m)
- Height: 8 ft 2 in (2.49 m)
- Crew: 5 (Commander, gunner, loader/radio operator, driver, hull gunner)
- Armour: 64 mm (2.5 in) on the hull front, 76.7 mm (3.02 in) on the turret front
- Main armament: Ordnance QF 6-pounder with 75 rounds Ordnance QF 75 mm with 64 rounds
- Secondary armament: 2 × 7.92 mm Besa machine gun with 4,950 rounds
- Engine: Rolls-Royce Meteor V12 petrol 600 hp (450 kW)
- Power/weight: 21.4 hp/tonne (16 kW/t)
- Transmission: Merritt-Brown Z.5 gearbox (five forward and one reverse gear)
- Suspension: Improved Christie
- Ground clearance: 16 in (410 mm)
- Fuel capacity: 116 imp gal (530 L) + optional 30 imp gal (140 L) auxiliary
- Operational range: 170 mi (270 km) on roads, 80 mi (130 km) cross country
- Maximum speed: 40 mph (64 km/h) maximum with 3.7:1 final reduction drive; 25 mph (41 km/h) on roads; 18 mph (29 km/h) cross-country

The Cromwell tank, officially Tank, Cruiser, Mk VIII, Cromwell (A27M), was one of the series of cruiser tanks fielded by Britain in the Second World War. (Note: The eighth Cruiser tank design, its service name given for ease of reference and its General Staff specification number respectively.) Named after the English Civil War–era military leader Oliver Cromwell, the Cromwell was the first tank put into service by the British to combine high speed from a powerful, reliable engine (the Rolls-Royce Meteor) and reasonable armour. The intended dual-purpose high-velocity gun could not be fitted in the turret, so a medium-velocity dual-purpose gun was fitted instead. Further development of the Cromwell combined with a high-velocity gun led to the Comet tank.

The name "Cromwell" was initially applied to three vehicles during development. Early Cromwell development led to the creation of the A24 Cavalier. Later Cromwell development led to the creation of the competing Centaur tank (officially the Tank, Cruiser, Mk VIII, Centaur (A27L)). This was closely related to the Cromwell, both vehicles being externally similar. The Cromwell and Centaur tanks differed in the engine used; the Centaur had the 410 hp Liberty engine, the Cromwell had the significantly more powerful 600 hp Meteor; Centaur hulls were converted to Cromwells by changing the engine.

The Cromwell first saw action in the Battle of Normandy in June 1944. The tank equipped the armoured reconnaissance regiments of the Royal Armoured Corps, in the 7th Armoured Division, 11th Armoured Division and the Guards Armoured Division. While the armoured regiments of the latter two divisions were equipped with M4 Shermans, the armoured regiments of the 7th Armoured Division were equipped with Cromwells. The Centaurs were not used in combat except for a few fitted with a 95 mm howitzer, which were used in support of the Royal Marines during the amphibious landings of Normandy.

== Development ==
=== Initial designs: A23, A24 ===
Development of the Cromwell and Centaur dates to 1940, as the Crusader tank was being readied for service. The General Staff were aware that the Crusader would become obsolete, and in late 1940 they set out the specifications for a replacement tank, expected to enter service in 1942, fitted with the QF 6 pounder gun.

Vauxhall responded with the A23, a scaled down version of their A22 Churchill infantry tank. This would have had 75 mm of frontal armour, used a 12-cylinder Bedford engine, carried a crew of five and would have had the same suspension as the A22.

Nuffield submitted the A24, heavily based on its Crusader design and powered by its version of the Liberty engine, a V-12 design dating to the late days of World War I and now thoroughly outdated. Nevertheless, as the design was based on the Crusader, it was expected it could be put into production rapidly.

The final entry was from Leyland and Birmingham Railway Carriage & Wagon (BRC&W). Their design (Note: It is unclear if it was granted its own number or also referred to as the A24.) was similar to the Nuffield, but with different suspension and tracks.

The designs were received and examined in January 1941, with Nuffield's A24 being declared the winner on 17 January. Six prototypes of the Cromwell were ordered for the spring of 1942. These arrived four months late, and by this time the design was already outdated. It was put into production anyway, but in service it proved underpowered. Only a small number were built.

Delays in the A24 program led to demands to get the QF 6 pounder into service earlier. This led to a series of up-gunned Crusaders mounting the 6 pounder.

=== Introduction of Meteor engine ===
With the start of the war, Rolls-Royce ended car production and set up a design team looking for other ways to use their design capability. The team formed under the direction of W. A. Robotham at Clan Foundry in Belper, north of Derby. They began recovering and refurbishing parts from crashed Merlin engines with the intention of using them for non-aviation purposes.

In October 1940, Robotham met Henry Spurrier of Leyland Motors to discuss British tank design. The Tank Board desperately needed a more powerful tank engine to replace the aging Liberty. Robotham and Spurrier decided to attempt to fit a refurbished and re-worked Rolls-Royce Merlin engine to a Leyland tank for testing. Design had three priorities:

- To remove the supercharger and make the engine operate on standard fuel;
- To fit the engine into a current Crusader tank so the engine, and the remaining elements of the tank could be tested under greater load;
- To improve the cooling system such that the larger output engine could be cooled in the same space.

They removed the supercharger from a Merlin Mk. III to downgrade the performance to a suitable level for tank use, reversed the direction of engine rotation to match tank transmissions, and fitted the resulting engine to a Leyland-built Crusader.

Delivered to Aldershot on 6 April 1941, the test team had trouble timing its runs because it was so fast, estimating it reached 50 miles per hour (80 km/h). Leyland arranged to start production of 1,000 examples of the engine as the Meteor.

With engine power doubled, it soon became apparent that the additional stresses placed on the Crusader components required significant re-work to increase reliability. Leyland had no spare capacity, and re-work commenced with the help of BRC&W. It was planned to fit this to BRC&W-built versions of their original A24 submission.

=== Design splits, and production commences: A24, A27L, A27M ===
Refitting the design of the A24 Cromwell for the Meteor engine was not acceptable to Nuffield, and hence a new specification of tank was created working with Leyland, the A27 Cromwell.

In mid-1941, Leyland changed its mind, concerned about cooling problems. This was a major concern for the Tank Board, as cooling issues had been a major problem for the previous generation of Crusader and Covenanter tanks. The Tank Board was still committed to the Meteor, but to avoid dedicating all resources into a potentially flawed design, the design was split into three separate vehicles:

- A24 Cromwell I under Nuffield, later known as "Cavalier". This was based on the existing specification of Liberty engine and Wilson steering, working from experience learned with the Crusader.
- A27L Cromwell II initially under English Electric, but design taken over by Leyland, later known as "Centaur". This was to be based on a revised and upgraded Liberty engine from Morris Motors and the newly available Merrit-Brown gearbox as used on the Churchill tank.
- A27M Cromwell III under BRC&W, which carried the Cromwell name through to production and service. This was to be based on the new Meteor engine and the Merrit-Brown gearbox, but was also to be designed such that the Liberty engine could be fitted if problems arose.

These early design designations of Cromwell I, II, and III are not to be confused with the later production designations of Cromwell I, II, etc. which were production variants of the A27M.

While Leyland continued with the Liberty under A27L, the Tank Board continued with the Meteor engine by placing an order directly with Rolls-Royce. Leyland also suggested using a diesel engine of their own design, although this was later abandoned. BRC&W became parent to the Cromwell in September 1941 working with David-Brown (gearbox) RR (engine) and Leyland (tracks and sprockets) and produced a pilot in January 1942.

Cromwell's cooling system was a new design and put through over nine months of testing in a variety of configurations. This included the development of new fan drives and inlet louvres, which can be seen on the Cromwell's engine deck. The resulting system for a Meteor-powered tank delivered both the necessary cooling performance, and reduced the power lost in driving the cooling system from 90 to 30 hp. ‘To Fred Hardy, the chief development engineer at Rolls Royce Belper, must go the credit for originating the design which finally solved the (cooling) problems. It was an outstanding piece of engineering’. This made the performance improvement of the Meteor over the Liberty even more pronounced and left room for expected development of the A27.

The first (mild steel) prototype of a Meteor-powered A27M Cromwell was delivered to the Army for trials in March 1942, several months before the A24 that was supposed to precede it, and also prior to the A27L Centaur pilot vehicle which was delivered in June 1942. With nearly 600 hp (450 kW) it proved to be exceptionally mobile when tested.

Orders were placed for both A27L and A27M versions as there were concerns about the production rate of the Meteor. Design also commenced on a 17-pounder armed version under specification A30, leading to parallel development of the A30 Challenger.

As all of Rolls-Royce's production capacity was engaged in producing the Merlin engine for aircraft, production of the Meteor version was initially based solely on parts recovered from crashed aircraft, with many engines still showing crash damage. Additional sources for manufacturing the Meteor engine were investigated. Even when assigned reduced production quotas, BRC&W proved unable to meet the demand for Cromwell, and Leyland became the design and production parent of both the A27L and A27M versions including subcontracted work.

=== Engine production ===
Rolls was at this time having trouble meeting demand for the Merlin, let alone the Meteor. Rover was having trouble turning Frank Whittle's Power Jets W.2 jet engine design into a production engine due to increasing animosity between the engineers at Power Jets and Rover. Things became particularly heated when Whittle learned that Rover had set up a secret project (with the approval of the Ministry of Aircraft Production) to develop a simpler-to-produce "straight-through" version of the W.2. Whittle had, through Stanley Hooker of RR's supercharger division, been in contact with Rolls for help delivering some of the required parts that Rover proved unable to produce.

At the same time MAP was frustrated with Power Jets' complaints about Rover and the lack of a usable engine and had proposed in December 1942 that RR take over Power Jets but were not in a position to force such an event. The solution came in an agreement between Rover and RR. Ernest Hives, the head of Rolls had met Whittle and was fascinated by the jet engine (Rolls-Royce's main product was piston aero engines) called a meeting with his counterpart at Rover, Spencer Wilks, and the two met late in 1942 at the Swan and Royal pub in Clitheroe. Hives offered to trade the Meteor for the W.2, an offer Wilks jumped at. With approval by the company's boards and the MAP, Rover's jet engine team and production transferred to RR while Rover set up production of the Meteor engine at their Tyseley factory and at an additional line set up by Morris Motors in Coventry. (Note: Under Rolls Royce, both Whittle's and Rover's designs came to fruition as the Welland and Derwent engines respectively with the Derwent becoming the main production.)

Production began in November 1942. In August, new names had been given to all three designs; the original A24 Cromwell I became the Cavalier, the Liberty powered A27L Cromwell II became Centaur and the Meteor powered A27M kept the name Cromwell. It would take considerable time for Rover to make ready production lines for the Meteor and it was not until January 1943, that sufficient Meteor engines were available and the A27M Cromwell began production. The official handover of the Meteor and W.2 took place on 1 January 1943.

=== Armament choice ===
To increase production of Meteor engines Rover and Morris required machine tools from the US, that took time to deliver. In the interim, Centaur production continued, to avoid closing Cromwell tank production lines. The Cromwell had - in line with the then General Staff policy - originally been armed primarily for anti-tank work and the current QF 6-pounder (a high velocity tank gun with armour piercing (AP) ammunition met the requirement. A smaller number of tanks were to have the Ordnance QF 95 mm howitzer to fire high explosive and smoke shells as close support tanks.

The British experience in North Africa campaign was that during breakthroughs of the enemy line, tanks were encountered less often but anti-tank guns and infantry were the main targets. The US-supplied M3 Grant and M4 Sherman tanks in North Africa had a dual purpose 75 mm gun which fired a more effective HE shell than the 6-pounder at the cost of a reduction in armour-piercing performance and this was seen as desirable for British tanks. Once the Vickers 75 mm HV gun was seen to be too big for the Cromwell turret, work was begun in December 1942 on the Ordnance QF 75 mm (a development of the 6-pounder that fired US ammunition) for fitting to British tanks. The new General Staff policy was announced at start of 1943; British medium tanks would be equipped with dual-purpose guns that were effective against current German tanks and they would be supported by tanks with high power anti-tank guns and close support weapons. Mark IV Cromwells were delivered with 75 mm guns from October 1943. (Note: Churchill tanks were fitted with 75 mm from new or converted from the 6-pounder from November too.)

To maintain the capability to take on Axis tanks, production was to be split

- 10 per cent fitted with Ordnance QF 95 mm howitzer
- 30 per cent with a high velocity weapon, either the 6-pounder or under the A30 development the 76 mm 17-pounder
- 60 per cent with a "dual purpose weapon"

Noting the problems with the medium velocity 75 mm dual purpose weapon, Vickers had already commenced development of a high velocity 75 mm gun that would fire American 75 mm ammunition but at a much higher velocity.

A move to Sherman tanks was not acceptable to British forces who would then be dependent on the US for tank production. The Cromwell with the Meteor engine and a HV weapon was shown to have superior power and armament, while US efforts to produce the Sherman replacement, the T20 medium tank, were not receiving sufficient attention.

A compromise was achieved with a reduction in British tank production during 1943 and 1944, with an increase in the use of Sherman tanks, the remainder being delivered in parts as spares. Centaur production bore the brunt of this reduction, having only been continued to maintain factories producing Cromwell hulls while the number of Meteor engines was inadequate. It had already been arranged that Centaur production would end when Meteor engine production increased. The list of machine tools required for the increase in Meteor output was also agreed upon, allowing Cromwell manufacture to scale.

At the same time as negotiations with the US, problems were being encountered with the use of the Vickers 75 mm HV gun in the Cromwell, with a larger turret ring being required. This was now expected to be introduced in mid-1944, leaving the majority of Cromwells with the medium velocity guns similar to the Shermans. Design of the high velocity variant was split to a separate specification. Intended as just another version of Cromwell, the new A34 version eventually needed significant re-engineering leading to production of the A34 Comet, which used a high velocity gun firing 17-pounder projectiles with a smaller cartridge down a shorter barrel. In the interim, the A27M version started.

=== Early trials ===
The first real field test of the design was carried out in August–September 1943, when examples of the Centaur and Cromwell were tested against Shermans (the diesel-engined M4A2 (Note: in British service known as "Sherman III") and multibank petrol-engined M4A4 (Note: in British service known as the "Sherman V")) in Exercise Dracula, a 2,000 mi (3,200 km) long trip around Britain. The Shermans proved to be the most reliable by far, requiring 420 hours of specialist fitter attention over a total distance travelled of 13,986 mi (22,508 km) with 199 defects. This corresponds to 0.03 hours per mile. In comparison, the Cromwells drove 11,582 mi (18,639 km) with 367 defects and required 814 hours, or 0.07 hours per mile. The Centaur managed only 8,492 mi (13,667 km) with 297 defects, due to constant breakdown, and required 742 hours, or 0.087 hours per mile.

The Cromwell and Centaur were given additional time to work out these problems. The Cromwell problems were mostly related to oil leaks and brake and clutch failures, an observer noting that these were well-known and should already have been corrected. The crews expressed their love for the design and especially its speed and handling. The Centaur was largely dismissed, with one observer expressing his hope that units were being equipped with it only for training purposes. The same reviewers unanimously supported the Sherman. A similar test in November demonstrated the Cromwell was improving, while the underpowered Centaur fared no better than in the first test.

Alongside Cromwell production, Centaur production design also allowed for the later conversion to the Meteor engine. A small number were retro-fitted for trials as Cromwell III and Cromwell X. As the Cromwell proved itself, larger numbers were fitted with the Meteor engine on the production line as Cromwell III and IV (not to be confused with the earlier Cromwell III design project).

=== Final specification ===
The production model design was finalised on 2 February 1944 when Leyland released specifications for what they called the "Battle Cromwell".

This included a number of minor changes to the basic design, including 6 mm (0.24 in) of extra armour below the crew compartment, the introduction of an all-round vision cupola for the commander, seam welding all joints to waterproof and strengthen the tank, and standardising on the A27M version with Meteor engine and Merritt-Brown transmission.

The Cromwell Final Specification was applied part way through the production of Cromwell III and IV, changing the appearance and specification of both vehicles. The specification was later improved toward the end of the war with the Cromwell VII, resulting in an upgrade programme.

Centaur and Cavalier never met the requirements to enter front-line service. Most were used for training, although a few notable exceptions were used in action.

== Production ==
Total A27 production consisted of 4,016 tanks, 950 of which were Centaurs and 3,066 Cromwells; another 375 Centaur hulls were built for an anti-aircraft gun turret; only 95 of these were completed. Production was led by Leyland Motors on Centaur, and Birmingham Railway Carriage and Wagon Company (BRC&W) on Cromwell. Several other British firms built Centaur and Cromwell tanks, as the numbers required were greater than any one company could deliver. Companies contracted to build the tanks included English Electric, Harland and Wolff, John Fowler & Co., LMS Railway, Metro-Cammell, Morris Motors and Ruston-Bucyrus.

Production of Cromwell and Centaur was split into two groups. The Cromwell was to be built by BRC&W and Metro-Cammell while Centaurs were to be built by Leyland, English-Electric, Harland & Wolf, John Fowler & Co., LMS, Morris, Ruston-Bucyrus. Nuffield also switched production to the Centaur when the Cavalier order was completed. To increase Cromwell production capacity, English Electric switched from manufacturing the Centaur to the Cromwell but remained tooled for the Centaur. This resulted in a number of Cromwells being built with Centaur hulls. By January 1943, when production started, Leyland had become the production and design lead for A27 series including subcontractors producing components. Records show that John Fowler & Co. also produced both varieties. Vauxhall produced two Cromwell pilot models—with a turret similar to that of the Churchill—in the expectation that they would build Cromwells once production of Churchill was terminated in 1943 but Churchill production was extended and Vauxhall withdrew from the Cromwell programme.

== Design ==
=== Hull ===
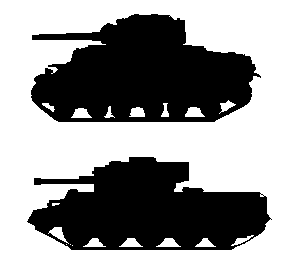
Silhouettes of M4 Sherman (top) and Cromwell (bottom) together

The frame was of riveted construction and welding was used later. The armour plate was bolted to the frame; large bosses on the outside of the plate were used on the turret. The suspension was of the Christie type, with long helical springs (in tension) angled back to keep the hull sides low. Of the five road wheels on each side, four had shock absorbers. The tracks were driven by sprocketed wheels at the rear and tension adjusted at the front idler, this being standard British practice. Some variants were produced with 14-inch-wide (360 mm) tracks; later, 15.5-inch tracks were used. As with previous Christie-suspension cruiser tanks, there were no track return rollers, the track being supported instead on the tops of the road wheels, known as the "slack-track" design. The side of the hull was made up of two spaced plates, the suspension units between them, and the outer plate having cutouts for the movement of the road-wheel axles.

The gearbox had five forward and one reverse gears. The first gear was for "confined spaces, on steep inclines or...sharp turns". The transmission was the new Merrit-Brown Z.5, which offered differential steering without clutching or braking, a big advance in design. It gave the Cromwell superb manoeuvrability. The Meteor engine delivered 540 hp (400 kW) at 2,250 rpm giving the Cromwell speed as well as manoeuvrability. This was the maximum rpm, which was limited by governors built into the magnetos. Fuel consumption on "pool" petrol (67 octane) was between 0.5 and 1.5 miles per gallon depending on terrain.

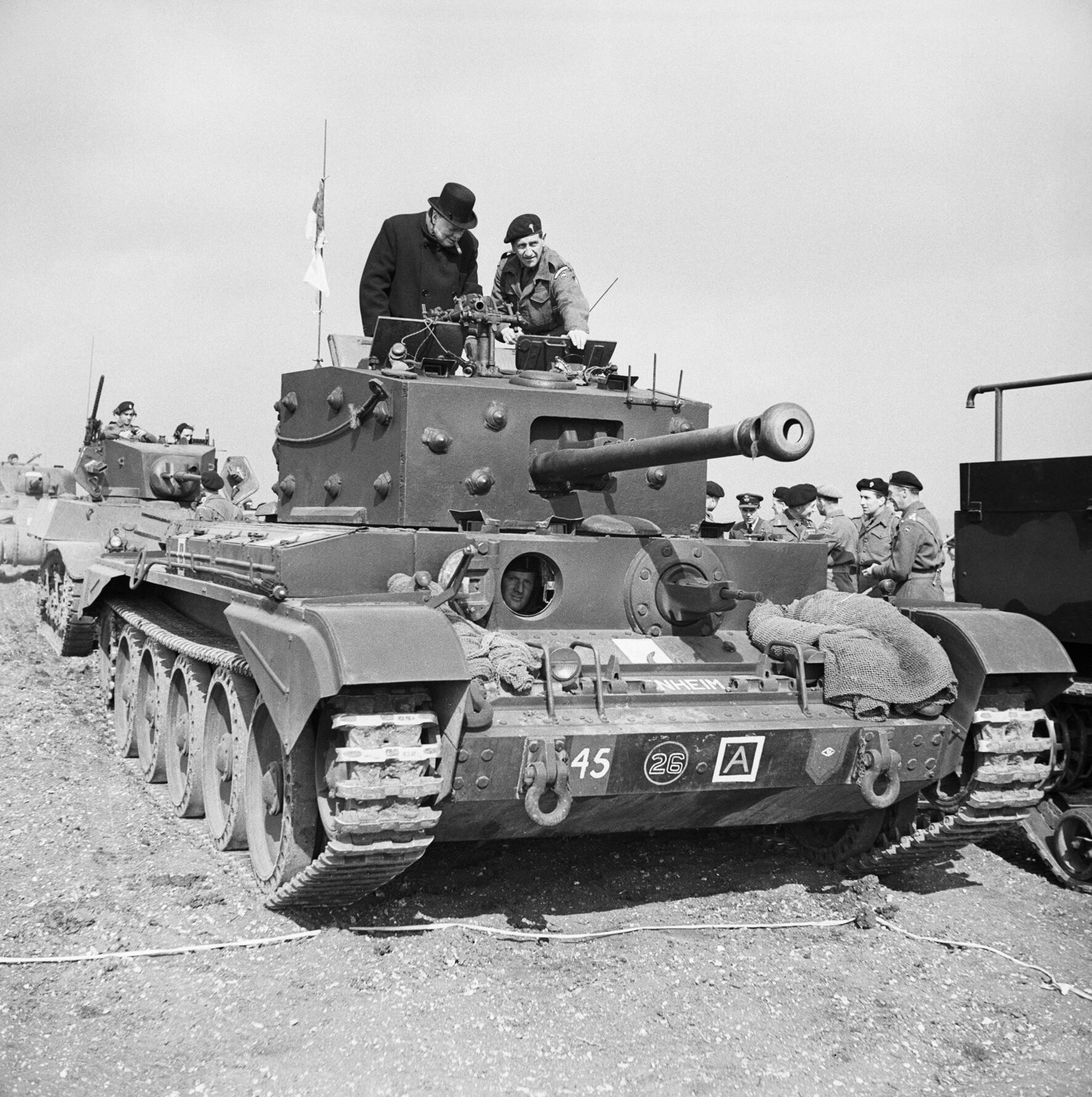
Churchill inspecting a Cromwell. The driver can be seen looking through the port to the left, with periscopes above him.

The driver sat on the right in the front of the hull, with the hull gunner on the left, separated by a bulkhead. The driver had two periscopes and a visor in the hull front. The visor could be opened fully or a small "gate" in it opened; in the latter case, a thick glass block protected the driver. The gunner had a single sighting periscope. A bulkhead with access holes separated the driver and hull gunner from the fighting compartment. A bulkhead separated the fighting compartment from the engine and transmission bay. The engine compartment drew cooling air in through the top of each side and the roof and exhausted it to the rear. To allow fording through up to 4 ft (1.2 m) deep water, a flap could be moved to cover the lowermost air outlet. Air for the engine could be drawn from the fighting compartment or the exterior; it was then passed through oil bath cleaners. It was modified so that the exhaust fumes were redirected so that they were not drawn into the fighting compartment, a problem found when tanks were drawn up together, preparing to advance.

In June 1944, the Cromwell saw action during Operation Overlord, the Allied invasion of Normandy. It had a mixed reception by crews, being faster, and with a lower profile than the Sherman tank but also being smaller and more cramped. The Cromwell had 64 mm (2.5 in) of frontal armour, compared with 51 mm (2 in) on the glacis of the early Shermans, though it was unsloped and hence less effective in practice. 123 Cromwells were later produced with applique armour on the hull front that reached 101 mm (4.0 in).

=== Turret and armament ===
Following British tank doctrine, the vehicle was designed to fire on the move. The turret offered hydraulically powered turret traverse motors with proportional speed control. Later vehicles fitted an all-round view cupola for the commander to identify and track targets. Both gunner and commander had rotating and pivoting Vickers Gundlach tank periscopes, while two fixed episcopes were fitted in the rotating cupola. There was a 7.92 mm Besa machine gun mounted co-axially to the main armament, operated by the gunner. A second was gimbal mounted in the front of the hull, with 45 degrees horizontal and 25 degrees vertical movement. Sighting was by a No. 35 telescope, which was connected through a linkage to the mounting. In the top of the turret was a 2-inch "bombthrower" angled to fire forward. Thirty smoke grenades were carried for it.

Early models of the Cromwell were equipped with the QF 6-pounder (57 mm). Using the new armour-piercing discarding sabot round, which became available in quantity in early 1944, this gun could penetrate over 100 mm (3.9 in) of steel armour at ranges on the order of 1,000 yd (910 m), making it effective against all but the most heavily armoured tanks. British tank crews had long complained about this weapon's lack of a useful high explosive (HE) round for attacking soft targets like trucks, anti-tank guns and infantry defences. A HE shell had been introduced for the 6-pounder, but it was described as being largely useless—the calibre of the gun was simply too small to carry a useful load of explosive. This was not entirely accidental; British tank policy of the time suggested that different models of the same tank, carrying specialist weapons, was a better solution to this problem than a universal gun that attempted to do all things.

Experience with the US M3 75 mm gun suggested this thinking was wrong, that a gun could be used in a "dual purpose" role against both tanks and softer targets. This led Vickers to begin development of a 75 mm weapon of 50 calibres in length, which would fire the same HE shell as the US gun, but with a higher propellant load that would make its anti-tank rounds more effective. As examples of this weapon began to arrive in May 1943, it was clear it would not fit into any turret that could be mated to the Cromwell's turret ring. The problem was eventually solved by the realisation that the 6-pounder could be bored out to 75 mm and fire unmodified US ammunition. While this would lead to poorer anti-tank performance, this was considered a reasonable trade-off in exchange for the rapid introduction of the HE rounds. The ROQF 75 mm could be easily swapped with the 6-pounder, and new models mounting the gun were known as the Mark V. The ROQF 75 mm would be the primary weapon for the majority of Cromwells produced. A close support version of the Cromwell was fitted with the QF 95 mm howitzer in place of the 75 mm. This too fired HE, though its primary role was delivering smoke shells, covering the other tanks in the unit. Some command or OP tanks had the armament removed, leaving space in the turret for further radios. These were fitted with a dummy wooden gun, so as not to appear different to the enemy and attract hostile fire.

=== Cromwell and Centaur differences ===
Aside from the engine and its ancillaries (fans, radiator, clutch, etc.) the vehicles are very similar designs. While similar, there were a number of minor variations between the Cromwell and Centaur caused by the divergence of design and production. Increases in the Cromwell's design weight from 24 to 27 long tons (24 to 27 t) resulted in a reworking of the suspension during the design process, which was not reflected on the Centaur. The Cromwell had heavier grade suspension with longer suspension arms. The Cromwell's shock absorbers and springs were improved against the Cavalier, and increased to four (compared with the Centaur's three).

The method of track tensioning is a commonly noted difference. Initially, the design based on the A24 Cavalier used a worm drive for tensioning. This was noted to be slow to operate and trapped dirt. BRC&W developed an alternative ratchet mechanism based on the Valentine tank, and this was incorporated into the A27M Cromwell design, also enabling the tank to accept wider 15.5 in (390 mm) tracks. Centaur under Leyland continued without this development. Some of these differences can be seen in Cromwells built with Centaur hulls, although many were removed with the introduction of the Cromwell Final Specification. This included the Cromwell method of track tensioning.

The Cavalier can easily be identified by the vehicle's rear armour plate, which incorporates Crusader-style horizontal angled exhaust louvres. The Cromwell and Centaur both have a flat rear armour plate, with exhaust venting to the top immediately behind the engine deck. For this reason, many Cromwell and Centaur vehicles had a cowl fitted to direct the exhaust gases back where they could not re-enter the tank fighting compartment.

=== Further developments ===
An earlier requirement for a 17-pounder armed tank became more important when the 50 calibre Vickers 75 mm HV gun failed to fit in the Cromwell. A version of the Cromwell mounting the more powerful Ordnance QF 17-pounder (76.2 mm) had been commenced by BRC&W early in the development process. This required a much larger turret ring, which in turn required the hull to be lengthened (with an additional road wheel added to each side for a total of six) and the centre hull section widened. The result was the A30 Cruiser Mk VIII Challenger, but had its limitations and only 200 were produced. (Note: The turret armour thickness was reduced to reduce weight and improve performance) While successful, production ceased in favour of the much easier conversion of Sherman Fireflys, originally developed as a safeguard for the A30 programme, allowing greater numbers to be fielded.

Development of the Vickers HV 50 calibre 75 mm gun continued, with the bore increasing to fire modified versions of the 17-pounder ammunition. This gun and its ammunition were designed to fit in a turret that a reworked Cromwell-sized design could carry. This became the 77 mm HV with only slightly lower performance than the 17-pounder. By the time this weapon was ready, a number of other changes had been worked into the tank design, producing the Comet, which replaced the Cromwell and Challenger.

== Performance ==
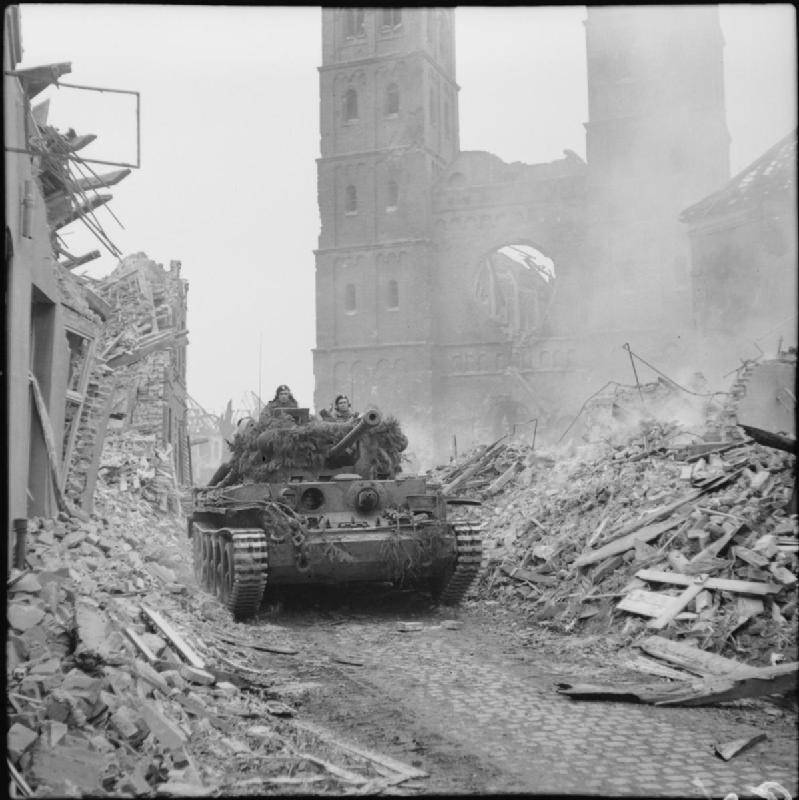
A King's Royal Hussars Cromwell of the 11th Armoured Division advances through Uedem, Germany, 28 February 1945

The A24 design specification had originally been constrained by the available tank engines of the time, delivering only 300 hp and limiting the weight. The evolution to A27M increased the weight slightly, but fitting a 600 hp engine almost doubled the power-to-weight ratio and created a very fast tank. This was combined with the Merrit-Brown gearbox that allowed the tank to steer while still powering both tracks, allowing it to maintain speed while manoeuvring, while tanks like the Sherman or T-34 lost power while turning and necessarily slowed down.

The Cromwell was the fastest British tank to serve in the Second World War, with a top speed of 40 mph (64 km/h). This speed was extremely beneficial in both attack and defence, outmanoeuvring opponents. At least one case is known of vehicle commanders using the vehicle's fast speed to jump large gaps. In the Netherlands, a troop of three Cromwells was able to leap a 20 ft (6.1 m) wide canal when surprised by enemy forces. This speed proved too much for even the Christie suspension and in later models the final drive ratio was changed to lower the top speed to 32 mph (51 km/h), which was still fast for its time.

The Cromwell's armament was changed from the 6-pounder to the dual-purpose 75 mm. This gave a significant reduction in armour penetration compared to newer 6-pounder armour-piercing discarding sabot ammunition, which was becoming available, but added the ability to fire high explosive (HE) shells that were more capable against other targets, such as anti-tank guns. The high velocity 75 mm gun was developed in an attempt to give both good anti-tank and HE performance, but in May 1943 proved too big to be fitted to the Cromwell. This issue led to the development of the A34 Comet, while the gun bore was increased to 76.2 mm to become compatible with 17-pounder ammunition, albeit with smaller shell casings with less propellant. The lack of a high-velocity weapon proved to be a significant limitation against opponents such as the Tiger, and the Cromwell had to rely on mobility.

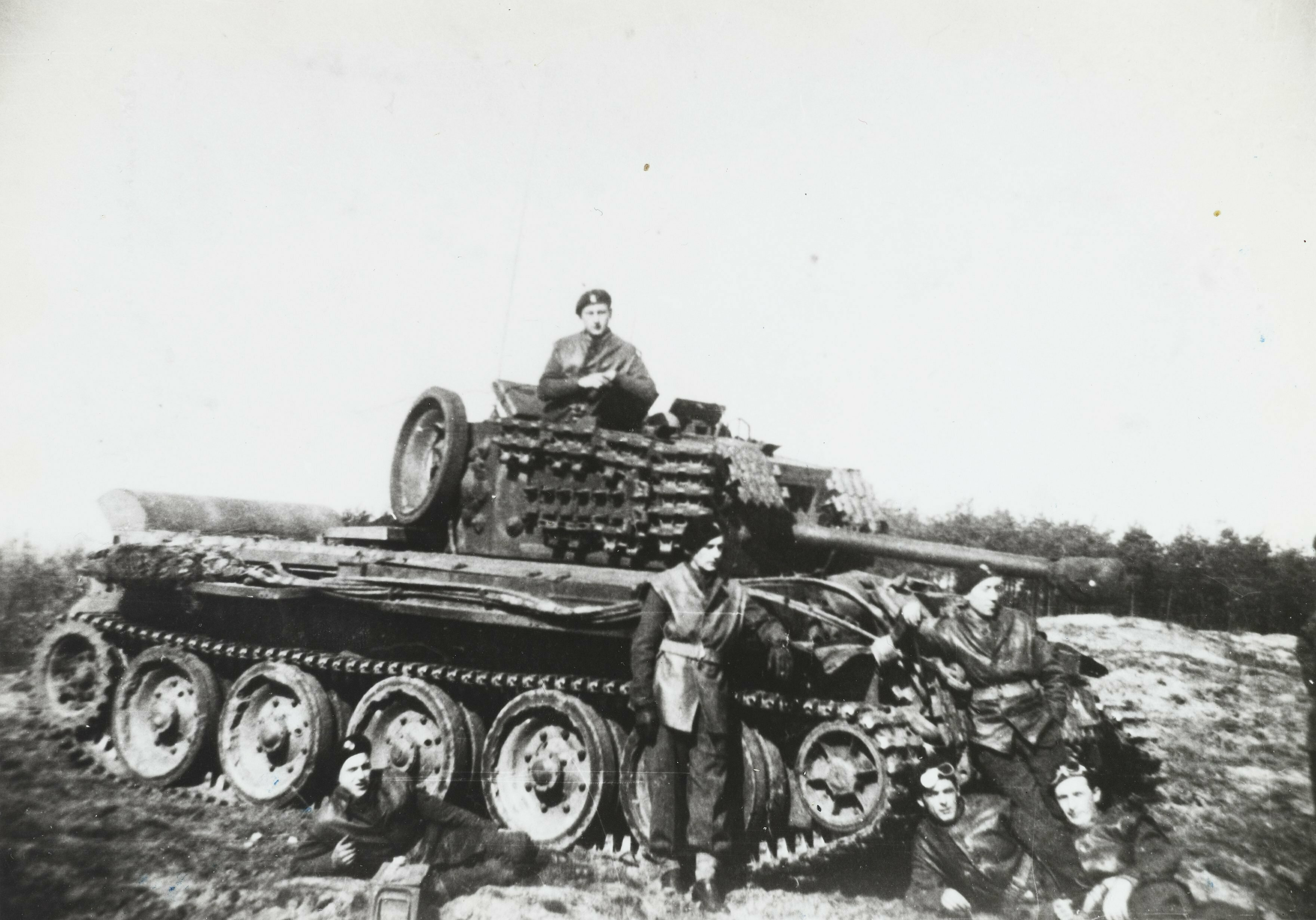
Track links and sections are used as additional armour on this vehicle belonging to the Polish 10th Mounted Rifle Regiment in 1945

The dual-purpose 75 mm main gun fired the same ammunition as the US 75 mm gun as used on the Sherman, and was also fitted to the Churchill and other British tanks later in the war, it had around the same HE and armour-piercing capabilities as the 75 mm-equipped Sherman tank. The Cromwell's speed and low profile gave an advantage over the Sherman, however, giving the tank the element of surprise and making return fire more difficult. Cromwell crews in north-west Europe succeeded in outflanking the heavier and more sluggish German tanks with superior speed, manoeuvrability and reliability.

The armour on the Cromwell ranged from 8 mm (0.31 in) to 76 mm (3.0 in) thick overall. On all-welded vehicles built by BRC&W, the weight saved by the welding allowed for the fitting of additional appliqué armour plates on the nose, vertical driver's plate and turret front, increasing the maximum thickness there to 102 mm (4.0 in). These vehicles are identified by their War Department numbers carrying the suffix W, e.g. T121710W. The armour compared well with that of the Sherman, although the Cromwell did not share the Sherman's sloped glacis plate. While the Cromwell was a match for the majority of Axis tanks in use, it was not a match for the armour and armament of the latest German heavy vehicles developed at the same time. British tank design would go through another stage, the Comet cruiser, before developing the Centurion tank.

== Combat service ==
=== World War II ===
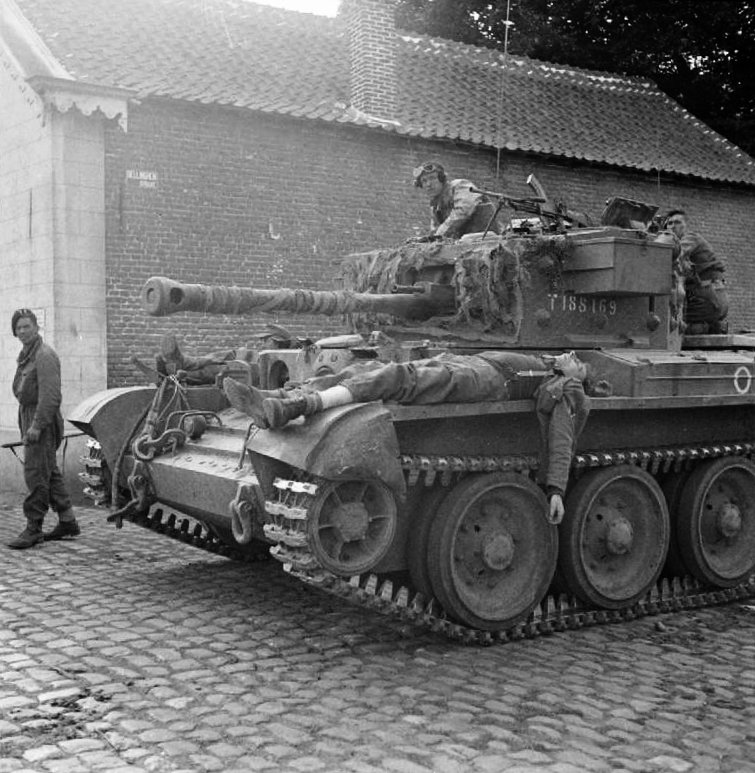
Wounded German soldiers being ferried to an aid post on the hull of a Cromwell tank

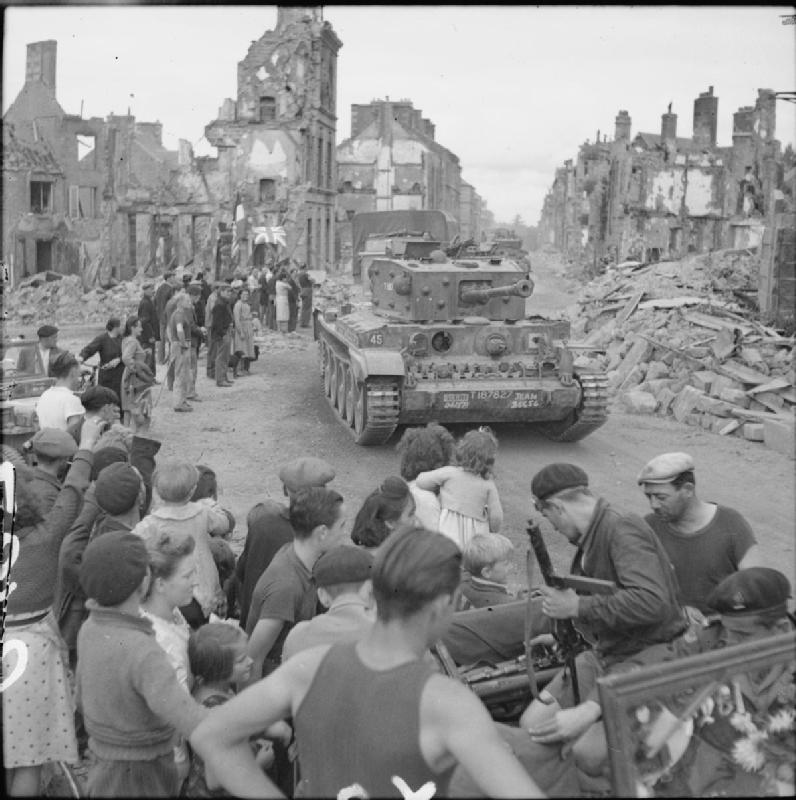
Cromwell tanks of 2nd Northamptonshire Yeomanry, 11th Armoured Division, passing through Flers, 17 August 1944

The Cromwell tank entered front-line service with the Allied invasion of Normandy in June 1944. Cromwells landed with the following forces on D+1. They saw extensive action with the British Army, forming part of the 6th Airborne Division, 7th Armoured Division, 11th Armoured Division, Guards Armoured Division, and 1st (Polish) Armoured Division. The tank was also used by the 1st (Czechoslovak) Independent Armoured Brigade Group as part of the First Canadian Army in Dunkirk.

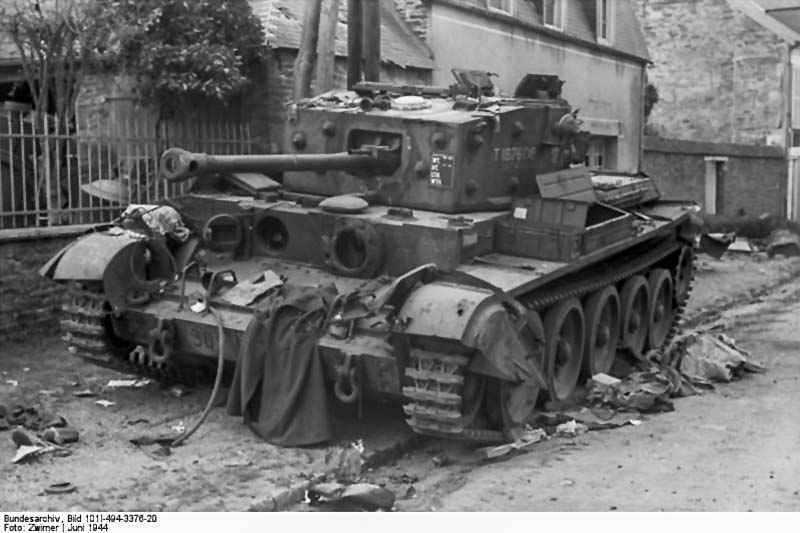
Damaged Cromwell tank

Cromwells were used as the main tank in the armoured brigades of the 7th Armoured Division, while being used in the armoured reconnaissance regiments of the other British armoured divisions, Guards Armoured Division and 11th Armoured Division, in north-west Europe. It excelled at this task because of its speed and low profile. The tank was praised for its speed and reliability, while its low profile made it harder to spot.

The standard 75 mm gun could tackle the majority of German armoured vehicles, and the HE shell was effective, but could not penetrate the front of heavier German tanks such as the Tiger or Panther. Although a rare occurrence on the battlefield, during the Battle of Normandy it was in the British sector where the majority of these German machines were encountered. The issue with the 75 mm gun was perhaps most pronounced during the Battle of Villers-Bocage in which the Cromwells were unable to engage German Tiger tanks frontally with any reasonable chance of success. Several Tigers were knocked out by British forces in the battle nonetheless.

The 75 mm HV had been intended to rectify this, but prior to entering service it was found to be too large to fit in the Cromwell's turret. Instead, Cromwells fought alongside the 17-pounder-armed Sherman Fireflys or Challengers, both of which could destroy Panthers and Tigers at standard combat distances. Cromwells (and 75 mm-armed Shermans) were supplemented by these vehicles at varying ratios per troop of 1/2 to 1/3. Though this provided a good solution to the issue of heavy German tanks, it added an additional level of complexity for battlefield commanders in having to place the 17-pounder tanks tactically within a formation. However this complication was not unique to the British Army; the US employed similar methods and faced the same issue with their 75 mm Sherman tanks.

This situation persisted until the development of the A34 Comet, mounting the new 77 mm HV gun, removed the need for mixed units.

In contrast, the Centaur was chiefly used for training; only those in specialist roles saw action. The Centaur IV close support version, equipped with a 95 mm howitzer, saw service in small numbers as part of the Royal Marine Armoured Support Group on D-Day. Originally intended to be used from landing craft and serve as static pillboxes, these examples retained the engines, allowing the marines to drive the tanks inland. A number of Centaurs were also re-purposed as combat engineering vehicles, such as armoured bulldozers.

The Sherman remained the most common tank in British and other Commonwealth armoured units in Europe. The Cromwell, in turn, was succeeded by small numbers of the Comet tank. This was based on the Cromwell and shared many components but had been designed from the outset to mount a superior gun, the 77 mm tank gun (a version of the 17-pounder with different ammunition). Only the 11th Armoured Division was fully re-equipped with the Comet before the war ended.

=== Units equipped ===
- 2nd Battalion Welsh Guards
- 8th King's Royal Irish Hussars
- 1st Royal Tank Regiment
- 5th Royal Tank Regiment
- 4th County of London Yeomanry (Sharpshooters) (to July 1944)
- 5th Royal Inniskilling Dragoon Guards
- 2nd Northamptonshire Yeomanry (to August 1944)
- 15th/19th King's Royal Hussars (from August 1944)
- 6th Airborne Reconnaissance Regiment, RAC, within 6th Airborne Division
- 16th Independent Armoured Brigade (Polish)
- 10th Mounted Rifle Regiment (Polish)
- Royal Marines Armoured Support Group (Centaur IV)

=== Post-war ===
Israel obtained two Cromwell tanks in 1948 after British sympathizers Mike Flanagan and Harry McDonald stole them from departing British forces in Haifa and delivered them to the Israelis. The tanks served with the Israel Defense Forces during the 1948 Arab-Israeli War.

During the Korean War, the British had a total of 14 Cromwell tanks: six of the 8th King's Royal Irish Hussars Regiment and eight of the 45th Field Regiment, Royal Artillery. The Royal Artillery Cromwells were artillery observation tanks, lacking the main gun, but with expanded observation and communication equipment.

In December 1950, 14 tanks were organized into "Cooper Force", led by Captain Donald Ashley-Cooper, and were deployed to Jangheung, Yangju to support the 1st Battalion, Royal Ulster Rifles Regiment, whose duty was to defend northwest of Seoul. On the night of 3 January 1951, the 1st Battalion of the Royal Ulster Rifles and Cooper Force retreated under orders from superior command to withdraw. During the process, 157 soldiers were killed and all the tanks were destroyed or abandoned as they escaped along the gorge without protection provided by friendly units.

One of the captured Cromwells operated by the communist forces was destroyed by a British Centurion tank near Hangang Railway Bridge on February 1. Another captured tank, deployed to Wolmido near Incheon by the communists, was recaptured by South Korean marines on February 10. American marines helped South Korean marines to repair the recaptured Cromwell for usage. However, the Marine Cromwell was only operated for a few days until it was handed back to its original owner, the British.

Cromwell tanks were also used by Czechoslovakia.

Fifty-two Centaur I tanks were donated in early 1946 to the Greek Army during the opening stages of the Greek Civil War but they were kept in storage due to the lack of trained personnel. In 1947, the first Greek officers returned from training courses in the United Kingdom and training of tank crews began. In April 1948, the Centaurs were organised in three Centaur tank companies, initially numbered II, IX and XI, but a year later were renumbered 381, 382, and 383 and temporarily attached to reconnaissance regiments 391, 392, and 393. The Centaurs saw limited service in the war because battles were fought mainly in mountainous areas, but proved useful in supporting infantry units and in defence of inhabited areas. After the end of the war, in October 1949, the three Centaur companies were organised into the 391 Tank Regiment. The Centaurs were replaced by US built M47s and in 1962 were sold and scrapped. One Centaur is preserved in the Greek Army Tank Museum.

The British Army, Austria and Jordan used the larger-gunned Charioteer development of the Cromwell post-war. Jordanian vehicles saw action in conflicts in the Middle East.

== Operators ==
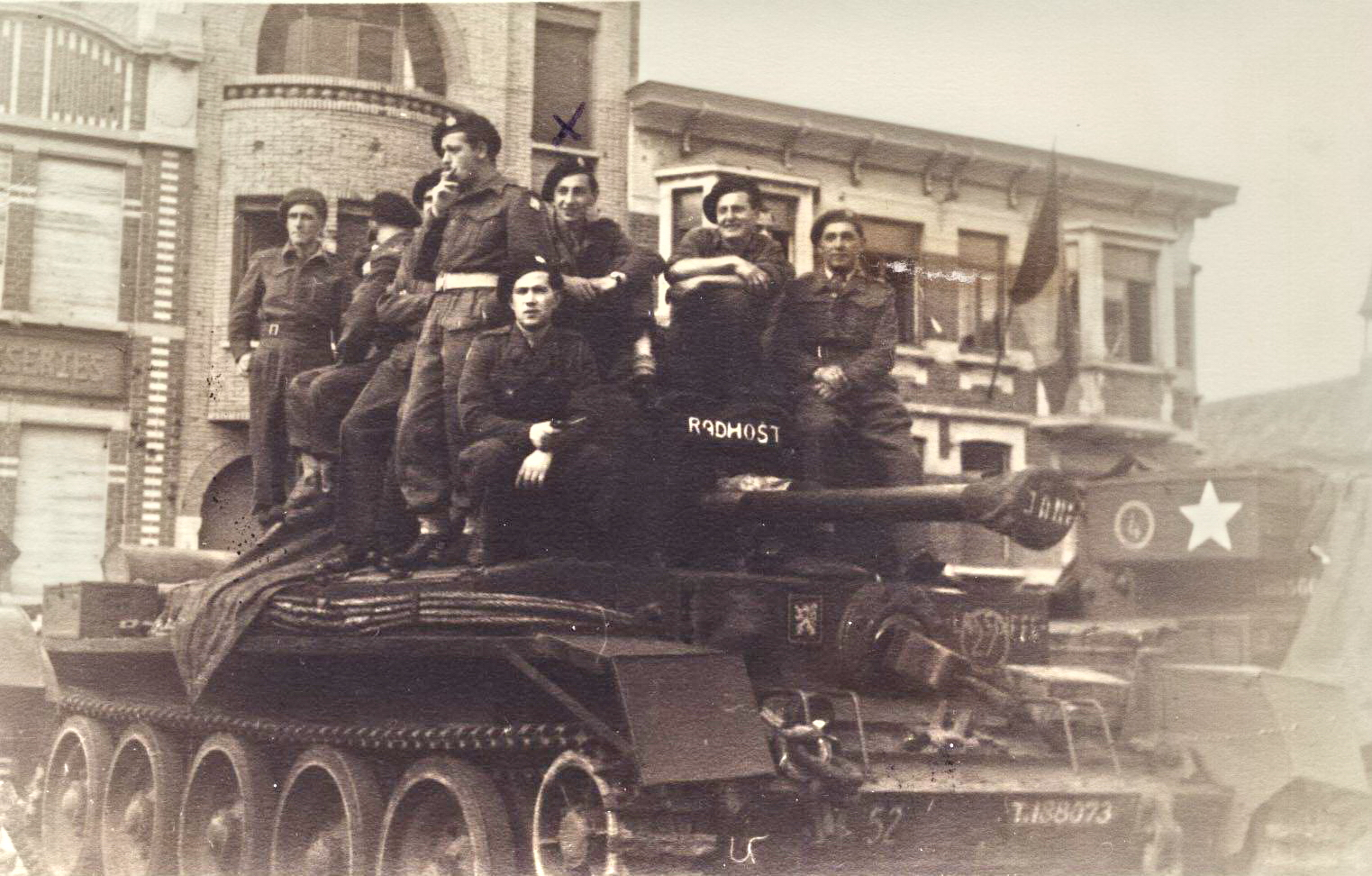
Czechoslovak soldiers on a Cromwell tank near Dunkirk in 1945.

- Czechoslovakia
- Greece
- France: in 1944, up to 150 Cromwell-type tanks were provided to the French army. some sources suggest those were all Centaur I and Cavalier I. The 4th Cuirassiers Regiment received Cromwell VIIs in March 1945. Those were scrapped in 1945 and the turret was used to build fortifications in Indochina.
- Israel
- North Korea: Handful captured from the British Cooper Force during the Korean War.
- South Korea: 1 recaptured from North Korea then returned to the United Kingdom.
- Poland : a regiment of 1st Armoured Division, which served in North West Europe in 1944-45
- Portugal
- United Kingdom

== Variants ==
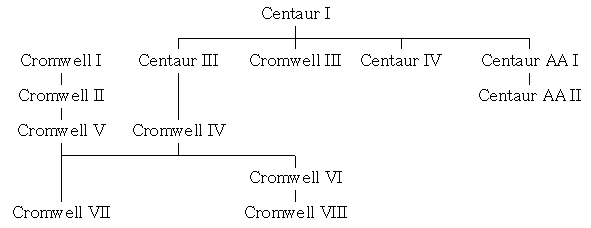

Development of hull types and armaments occurred independently. Hull types applied to all variants. A single mark could cover up to four types, and a type up to six marks making classification complex. Combinations of mark and type were applied by different manufacturers.

=== Cromwell ===
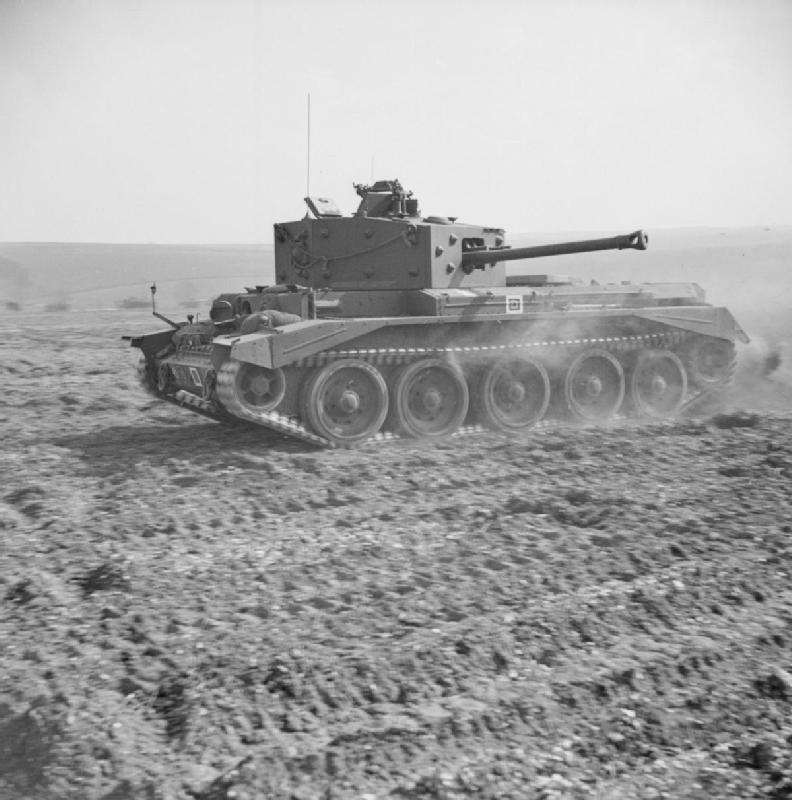
A Cromwell IV of the Welsh Guards displays its speed at Pickering in Yorkshire, 31 March 1944

Cromwell I
Early vehicles armed with the Royal Ordnance QF 6 pounder (57 mm) gun (with 64 rounds of ammunition). Only 357 produced due to the switch from the 6 pounder (57 mm) to the 75 mm gun.

Cromwell II
Pilot vehicle built by Vauxhall with cast turret similar to Churchill VII. This did not enter production.

Cromwell III
Centaur I hull fitted with Meteor V12 engine to A27M standard. Turret houses Royal Ordnance QF 6 pounder. Only ~ 200 produced due to scarcity of Centaur I's.

Cromwell IV
Centaur III hull re-engined with Meteor engine. Turret houses 75 mm ROQF Mk V gun. Later Cromwell IV's saw the introduction of the Final Specification, changing some features (such as track-adjuster) to normal Cromwell standard. The most numerous variant with over 1,935 units produced.

Cromwell V
Cromwell built to Final Specification and armed with the 75 mm gun.

Cromwell VI
Cromwell built to Final Specification and armed with 95 mm howitzer. 341 produced.

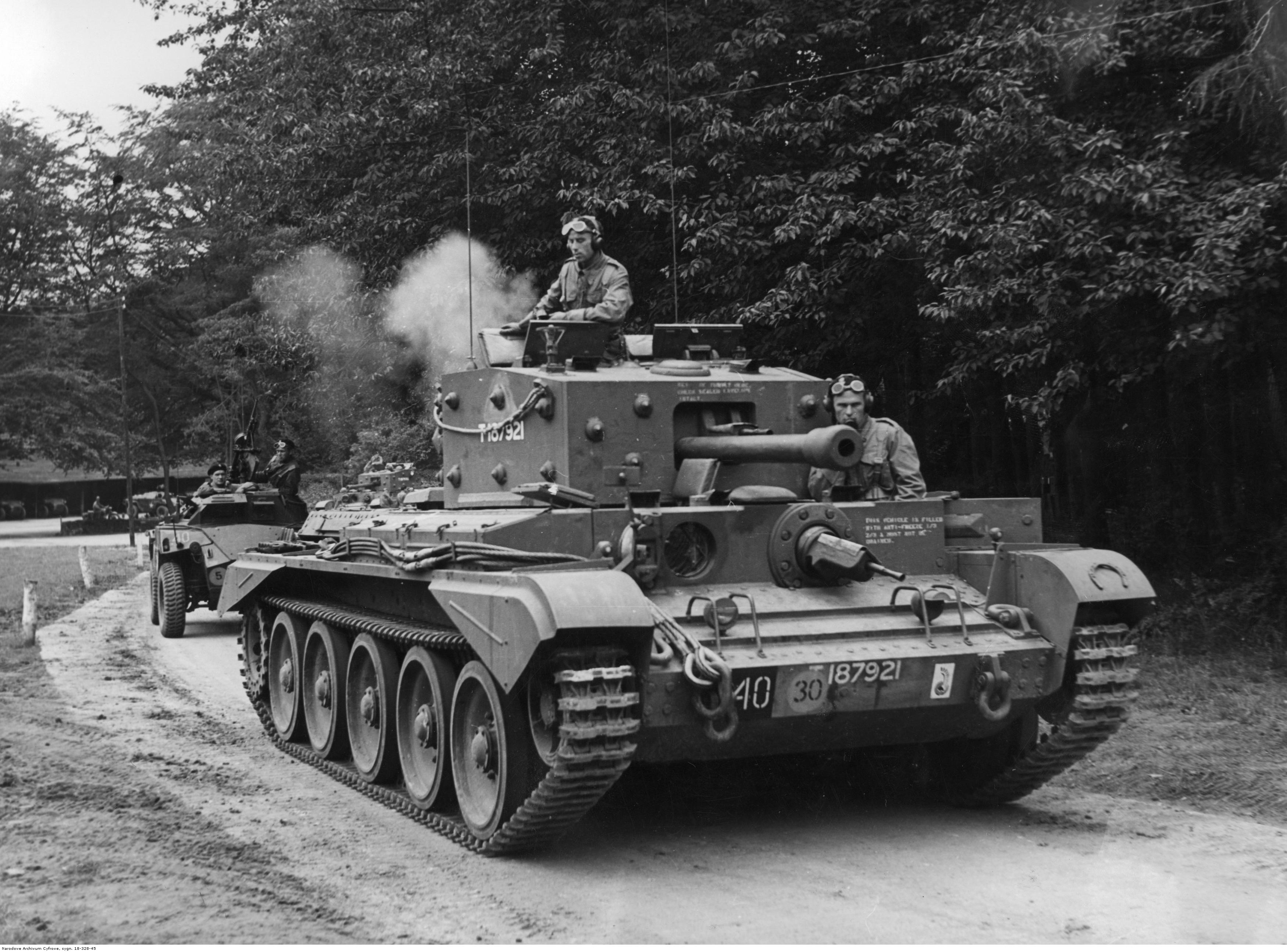
Cromwell VII of the 1st Armoured Division.

Cromwell VII
Upgrade to Cromwell IV, V, and VI armed with the 75 mm gun. Some hulls were upgraded with features from later hull types. Wider (15.5 inch) tracks, and upgraded suspension (where not fitted earlier in the production programme). These were introduced very late in the war and did not see much in the way of combat. ~ 1,500 produced, Some saw combat in the Korean War and many were later converted to FV4101 Tank, Medium Gun, Charioteer.

Cromwell VIII
Cromwell VI reworked with same upgrades as VII but retaining the 95 mm howitzer.

=== Centaur ===
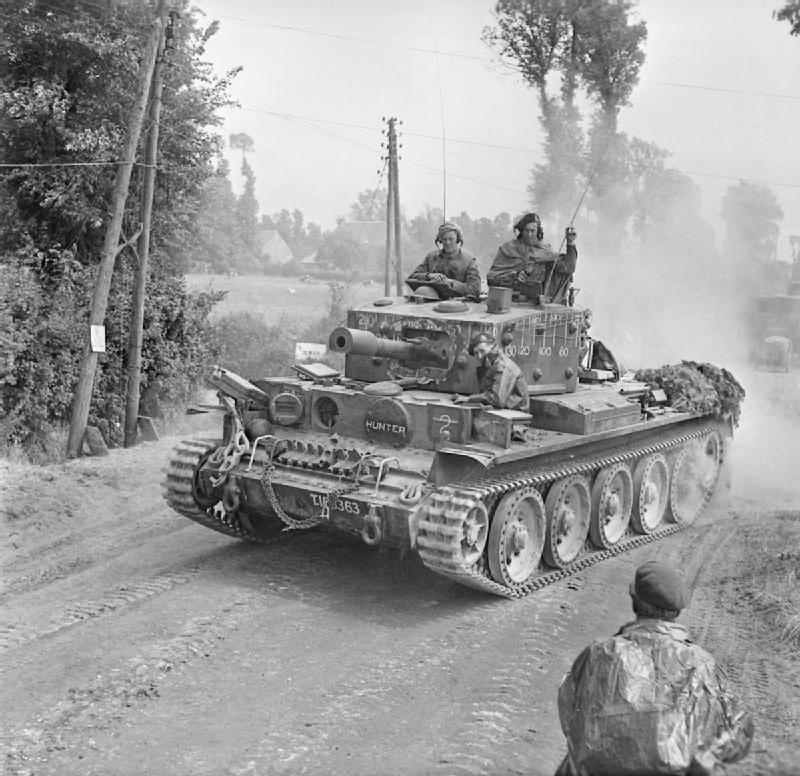
Centaur IV of Royal Marine Armoured Support Group, Normandy 13 June 1944

Centaur I
Armed with the Royal Ordnance QF 6 pounder (57 mm) gun (with 64 rounds of ammunition). It was used only for training. 1,059 produced.

Centaur II
Mark I with wider tracks and no hull machine gun. Experimental only.

Centaur III
Centaur armed with the 75 mm ROQF Mk V gun. In 1943, most Centaur I were converted to IIIs, but a few remained as such. 233 produced.

Centaur IV
Centaur armed with a 95 mm howitzer (with 51 rounds of ammunition). This is the only version of the Centaur known to have seen combat, in service with the Royal Marines Armoured Support Group. The vehicles were fitted with wading gear to get them ashore. Trunking waterproofed the engine inlets and covers were fitted to the guns. 114 produced.

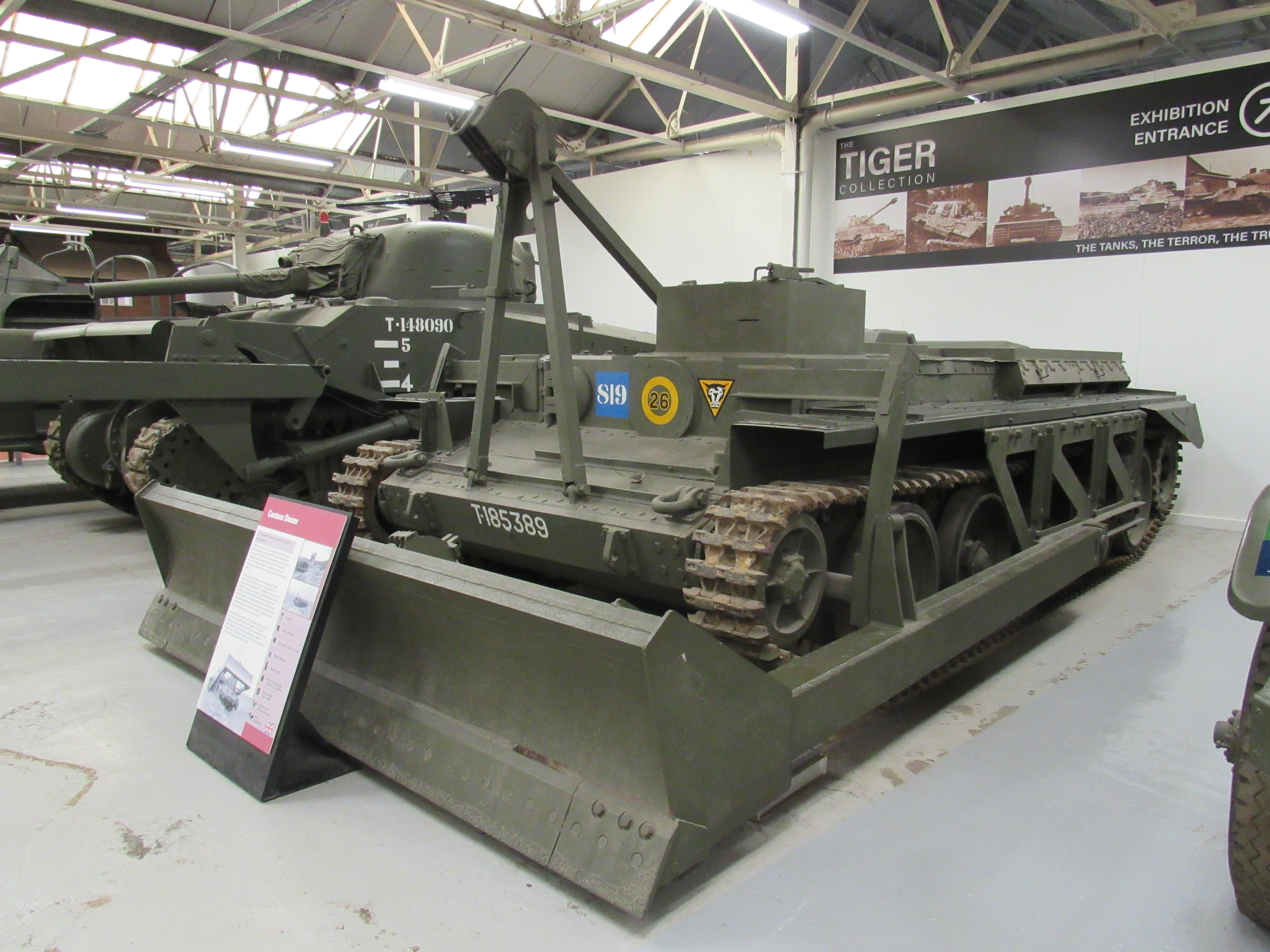
Centaur Bulldozer

Centaur Bulldozer
A Centaur tank with the turret removed and installed a simple winch-operated bulldozer blade. Used as armoured obstacle-clearing vehicle. Issued to the 79th Armoured Division in Belgium during the latter part of 1944.

=== Hull variants ===
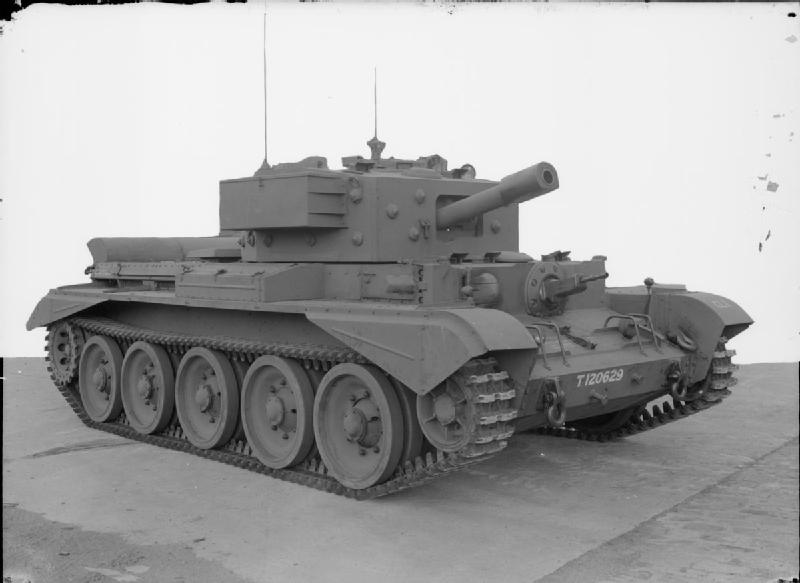
Cromwell VI with type F hull, showing driver's side-opening hatch and turret storage bins

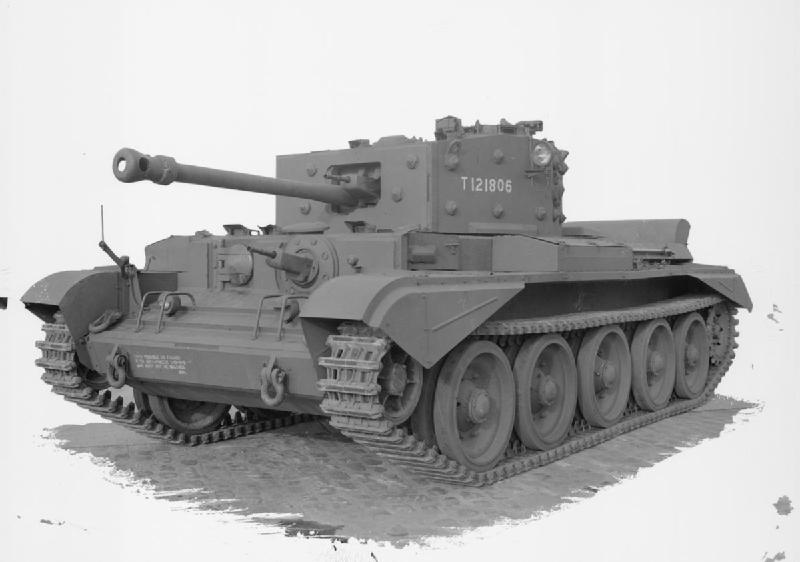
Cromwell VIIw with type Dw or Ew hull, showing welded construction with applique armour

Hull types ranged from type A to type F. Each type applied a different package of changes to the hull design to different marks of tank. Changing the vehicle type allowed the introduction of changes without changing the overall offensive capability.

Cromwell type	Construction	Major features	Cromwell Mark
A	Riveted	First version with: Top opening driver & hull gunner hatch; 4 lockers; Layered 6 mm + 8 mm floor plate	Cromwell I; Cromwell III; Cromwell X; Cavalier I
B	Riveted	As A, but: Side opening hatch for hull gunner; 3 lockers; Hull gunner periscope deleted	Centaur I; Cavalier I
C	Riveted	As B, but: Engine compartment armour reduced to save weight; Later vehicles added: Hull gunner periscope reinstated; Revised trackguards	Cromwell I; Cromwell III; Cromwell IV; Cromwell V; Centaur I; Centaur III; Centaur IV
D	D: Riveted Dw: Welded	As C, but: Engine deck redesigned for ease of access to radiators; Hull gunner periscope; Revised trackguards; On welded vehicles: Single-piece pivot-opening driver hatch; Applique armour	Cromwell IV; Cromwell Vw (welded); Cromwell VI; Centaur III; Centaur IV
E	E: Riveted Ew: Welded	As D, but: 14 mm single skin floorplate to hull; On welded vehicles: Lower ratio final drives	Cromwell IV; Cromwell Vw (welded); Cromwell VI
F	Riveted	As E, but: Driver and hull gunner side opening escape doors; 2 lockers; 2 turret bins replacing the removed lockers; towing rope on front glacis; Later vehicles added: Sprung towbar	Cromwell IV; Cromwell VI

== Vehicles based on chassis ==
=== Conversions ===
A number of further vehicles were based on the Cromwell tank hull, either re-working existing vehicles or built from scratch with the Cromwell as the basis:

Cromwell command
The main gun was removed and it carried one each of the No. 19 (low power) and No. 19 (high power) wireless sets. These were used by brigade and divisional headquarters.
Cromwell observation post
Cromwell IV, Cromwell VI, or Cromwell VIII fitted with extra radio equipment; 2 x No. 19 and 2 x No. 38 (portable) radios. The main gun was retained.
Cromwell control
Two No. 19 low power radios. Main armament kept. Used by regimental headquarters
Centaur, AA Mk I
Used a slightly upgraded turret from the Crusader III, AA Mk III, fitted with twin 20 mm Polsten guns instead of Oerlikons. Were originally deployed in Normandy, but withdrawn as unnecessary due to Allied air superiority. 95 were produced.
Centaur, AA Mk II
Mounted an enlarged turret that included an extra man, a gunner, sitting alongside the tank commander who now tracked the target for him, fitted with twin 20 mm Polsten guns.

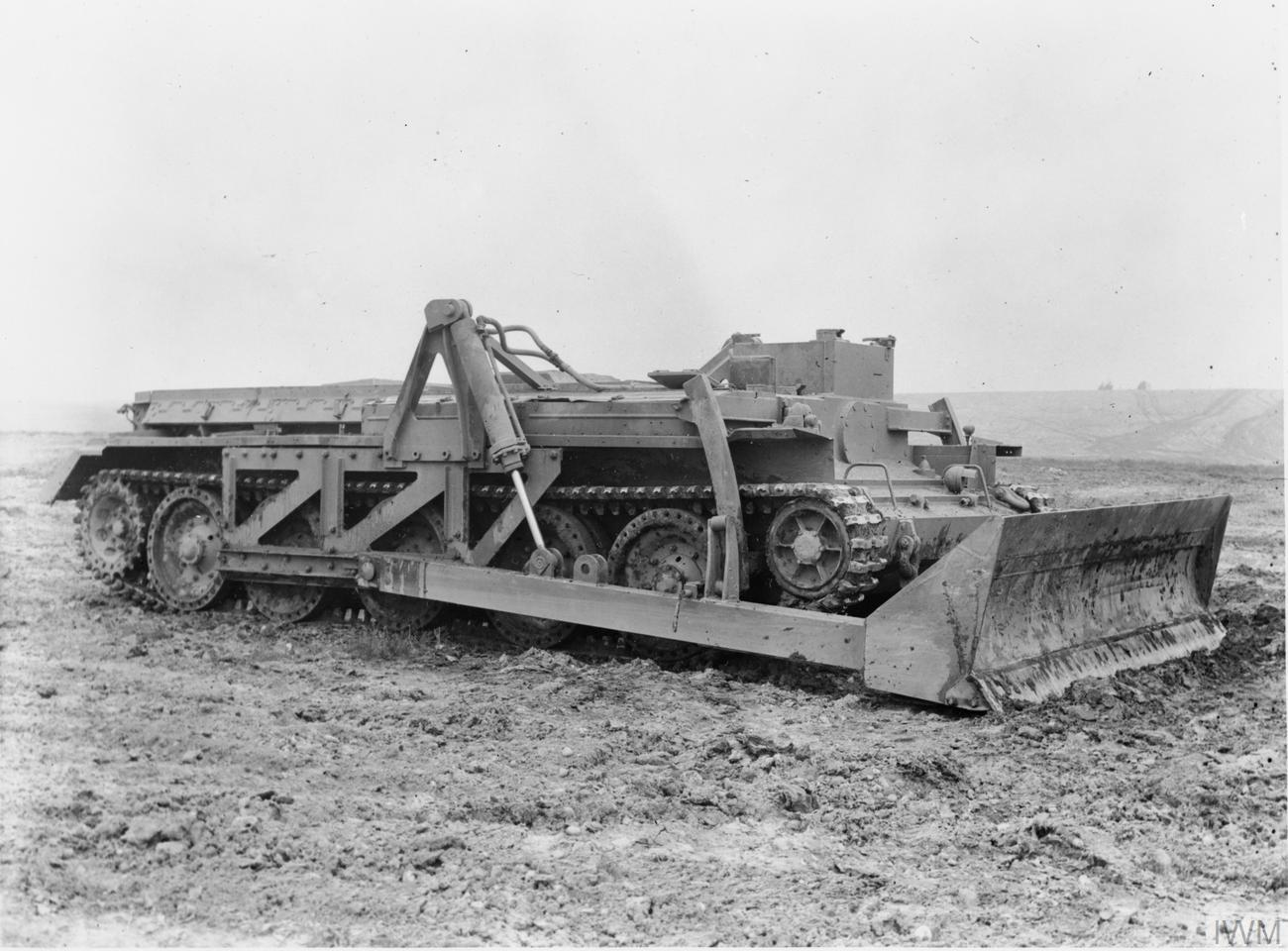
Centaur dozer with hydraulic operated blade

Centaur dozer
A Centaur with the turret removed and given a simple dozer blade operated by a winch. Since the winch passed over the top of the hull it was not possible to retain the turret. Issued one per Cromwell squadron and to RE. One of "Hobart's Funnies". 250 produced.
Centaur observation post (OP)
A Centaur with a dummy main gun, and extra radio communications.
Centaur Kangaroo
A Centaur with turret removed to make space for passengers. (Few produced)
Centaur armoured recovery vehicle (ARV)
A Centaur with turret removed, and replaced with winch fitted instead, and an optional A-frame.

Post-war, a number of Cromwells were upgraded to meet the new Cold War threat:

FV 4101 Charioteer
Cromwell hull with a QF 20-pounder gun in a tall turret, designed in the 1950s to give more fire support. 200 produced.

=== Designs based on the Cromwell ===
The Cromwell tank design was also used as the basis for the design other vehicles:

- Cruiser Mk VIII Challenger (A30): combined a lengthened Cromwell chassis with widened superstructure to mount the 17-pounder gun in a new turret.
- A30 Avenger SP 17pdr, a version of the Challenger using a lighter more open turret as a self-propelled gun role.
- Excelsior (Tank, Heavy Assault, A33), an experimental design with elements of an infantry tank as a possible replacement for the Churchill tank. When the Churchill continued to meet requirements, development was halted.
- Comet (A34), A tank based on lessons learned from the Cromwell development, incorporating a larger turret ring, enabling the use of a more powerful 77 mm HV gun (17-pounder with shorter barrel). This tank reflects much of what was intended for the Cromwell.

The Challenger was ordered into production in limited numbers and saw service alongside the Cromwell, the Comet entered service later in the war.

The A31 and A32 were attempts to convert the Cromwell to an infantry tank that never got beyond the design stage.

The majority of following British tank designs utilised the Meteor engine and Merritt-Brown steering and gearbox combination initially developed for the Cromwell, lasting all the way through the Centurion. This proved to be one of the primary elements in the development of the main battle tank.

== Surviving vehicles ==
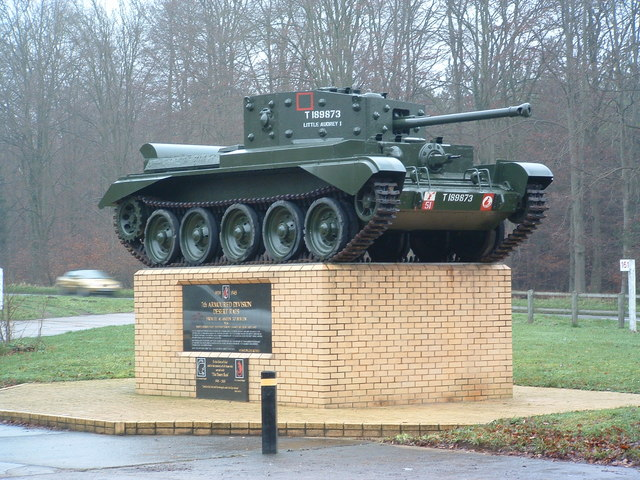
Cromwell IV memorial to the 7th Armoured Division (Desert Rats) Ickburgh in Norfolk

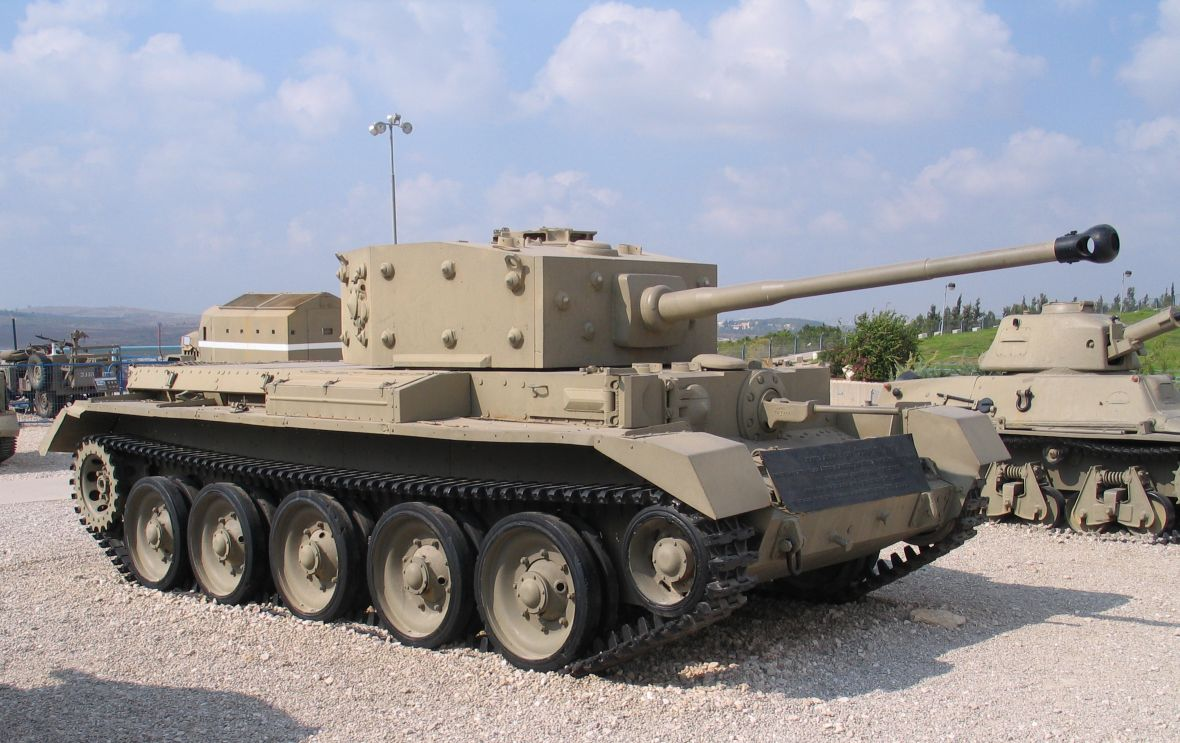
A Cromwell at Yad La-Shiryon, Israel.

Around 56 Centaur and Cromwell tanks survive, ranging from scrapyard wrecks to fully restored museum vehicles.

=== Cromwell tanks ===
Around 26 Cromwell tanks exist in various states.

- Cromwell I. Royal Australian Armoured Corps Memorial and Army Tank Museum, Puckapunyal, Victoria, Australia. Cromwell MkI shipped to Australia to assist with the up gunning of the Australian Cruiser tanks but did not arrive before that programme had been terminated. Repainted with the markings it arrived in Australia with, it is now under cover on display at the museum.
- Cromwell IV. The Tank Museum, Bovington, Dorset, England.
- Cromwell IV Command Tank T187617. Imperial War Museum Duxford, Cambridgeshire, England.
- Cromwell IV on A1065 road Thetford Forest, Norfolk, England, as part of a memorial to 7th Armoured Division ("Desert Rats") whose armoured regiments had trained there prior to embarking for Normandy.
- Cromwell IV Rick Wedlock Collection, UK. In running condition.
- Cromwell IV. National War and Resistance Museum, Overloon, Netherlands. Recovered after the Battle of Overloon in October 1944.
- Cromwell IV. Heintz Barracks, Bastogne, Belgium. In running condition.
- Cromwell IV Wilrijk, Antwerp, Belgium. This was unveiled in September 2014 for the 70th anniversary of the liberation of the city in 1944.
- Cromwell IV. Army Technical Museum, Lesany, Czech Republic. In running condition.
- Cromwell IV "Faust". Private collection, Czech Republic. In running condition.
- Cromwell IV. Kubinka Tank Museum, Russia.
- Cromwell IV. Museum of Zadorozhniy Tec, Russia.
- Cromwell IV and a Cromwell III. Yad la-Shiryon Museum, Latrun, Israel. Were used by the IDF in War of Independence (1948–1949).
- Cromwell IV "Blenheim". American Heritage Museum, Stow, Massachusetts, USA. In running condition.
- Cromwell IV. Private Collection, St. Louis, Missouri, USA.
- Cromwell IV. The Wheatcroft Collection, UK. Unrestored wreck.
- Cromwell IV(A27M). Adrian Barrell Collection, UK. Currently just a restored hull with no turret.
- Cromwell IV. Rex & Rod Cadman Collection, UK. Unrestored wreck.
- Cromwell IV. Heintz Barracks, Bastogne, Belgium. A wreck and not restored.
- Cromwell IV. Army Technical Museum, Lesany, Czech Republic. A wreck with no turret.
- Cromwell IV. Handmet Military, Gostyń, Poland. A wreck with no turret.
- Cromwell IV. Vojenské Museum, Králíky, Czech Republic. A wreck with no turret.
- Cromwell IV. Smržovka private tank museum, Czech Republic. Currently a wreck and not restored.
- Cromwell IV. Smržovka private tank museum, Czech Republic. A wreck with no turret.
- Cromwell IV.The Wheatcroft Collection, UK.
- Cromwell IV. Private collection, Czech Republic. This Cromwell hull was a spare parts donor for the restoration of the Cromwell nicknamed "Faust"

=== Centaur tanks ===
Around 17 Centaurs and 9 Centaur Dozers exist in various states.

- Centaur I. Muzeum Broni Pancernej Centrum Szkolenia Wojsk Lądowych, Poznań, Poland. Being restored to running condition (as of March 2015).
- Centaur I. Hellenic Army Armor Museum, Athens, Greece. The Greek Army received 52 Centaur I tanks from the British in 1946.
- Centaur IV T215477. Cobbaton Combat Collection, Devon, England. In running condition.
- Centaur IV. Musée des Blindés, Saumur, France.
- Centaur IV T185102 Vidette 95mm. Memorial Pegasus Bridge Museum, Ranville, France.
- Centaur IV T185075 . La Brèche d'Hermanville (Sword Beach), France. A Cromwell dozer with Cavalier turret to resemble Centaur support tank.
- Centaur IV. Calcada da Ajuda, Lisboa, Portugal. About 24 tanks were sold to Portugal.
- Centaur IV. Portuguese Army Cavalry School Museum, Santarém, Portugal. Mounted on a plinth in the town
- Centaur IV. Portuguese Army Cavalry School Museum, Santarém, Portugal.
- Centaur IV. Santa Margarida da Coutada, Portugal.
- Centaur IV. Amadora, Portugal. Two at Military Academy.
- Centaur IV. Two found 8 miles offshore in Bracklesham Bay, West Sussex, England. Discovered in a good state of preservation in the Solent, but are unlikely to be recovered.
- Centaur IV. Dennis Roberts Collection, UK. In running condition.
- Centaur VII. Rex & Rod Cadman Collection, Kent, England. Wreck of a Mark VII.
- Centaur VII T217875. Kevin Powles Collection. Vehicle under restoration.
- Centaur VII. Salisbury Plain Training Area, England. Used as live fire target.
- Centaur VII. Oberhoffen-sur-Moder, France. Wreck of Centaur VII stored outside with other tank wrecks.
- Centaur Dozer. Private Collection, UK. Tank restored to working order.
- Centaur Dozer T186642. The Tank Museum, Dorset, England. Restored.
- Centaur Dozer. Isle of Wight Military Museum, Hampshire, England. Restored, 79th Armoured Division insignia painted on hull front.
- Centaur Dozer. formerly of Isle of Wight Military Museum, Hampshire, England. Not restored in bad condition.
- Centaur Dozer T185462. Ian Galliers Collection UK. Unrestored in bad condition.
- Centaur Dozer. Armoured Corps Museum, Ahmednagar, Maharashtra, India.
- Centaur Dozer T185484. Armoured Corps Museum, Ahmednagar, Maharashtra, India.
- Centaur Dozer. Rex & Rod Cadman Collection, UK. Unrestored in bad condition.
- Centaur Dozer. Rex & Rod Cadman Collection, UK. Unrestored in bad condition.

=== Others ===
There are also a few chassis of indeterminate origin which might be either Centaur or Cromwells.

- Two hulls at The Tank Museum, Dorset, England.
- A hull in the Rex & Rod Cadman Collection, UK
- A hull and a dozer hull owned by Staman International Trading, Nijverdal, Netherlands.
- A dozer hull, Defence Services Museum, Myanmar
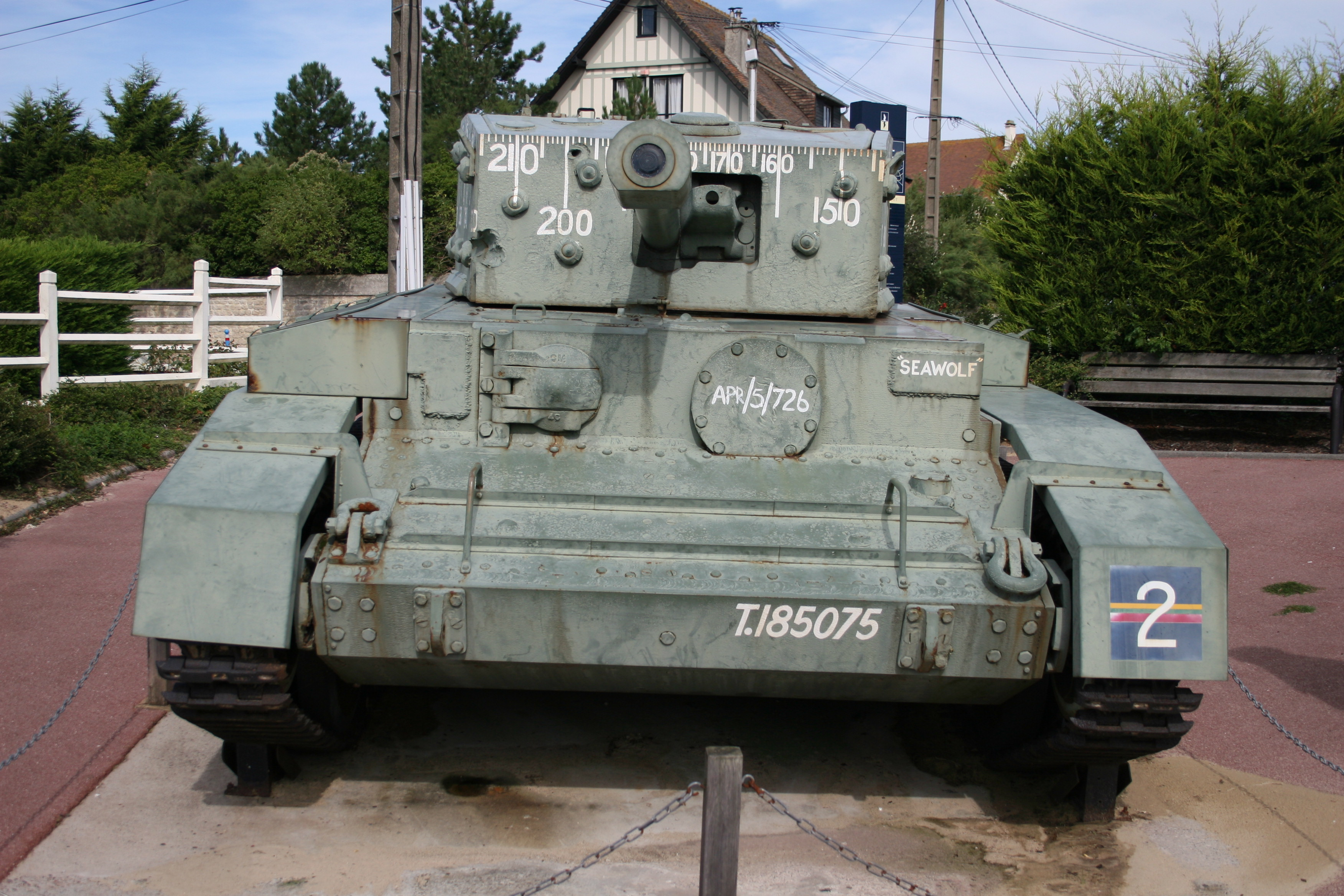
Centaur IV behind Sword Beach, Normandy, France

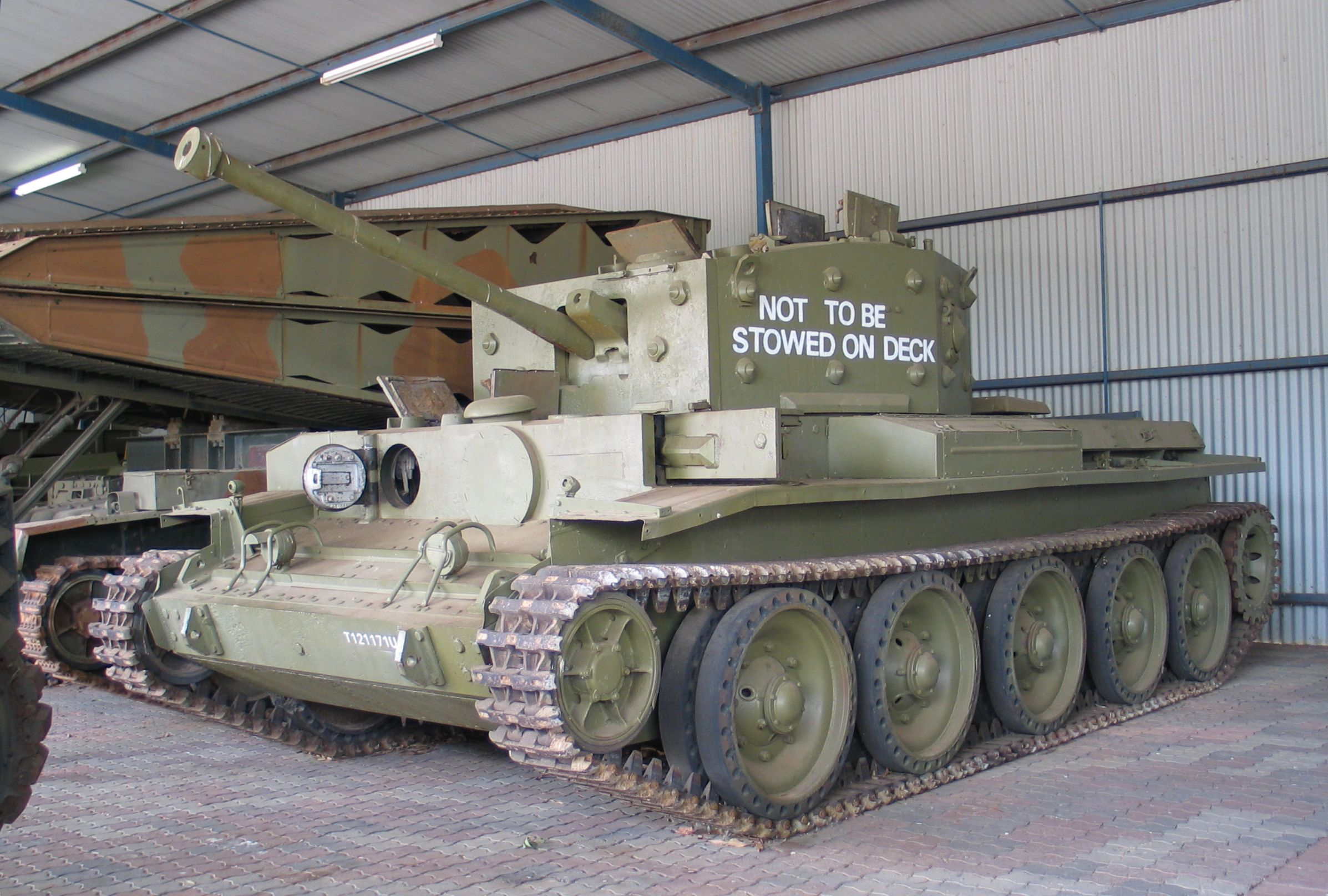
A Cromwell Mk. 1 displayed at the Royal Australian Armoured Corps Tank Museum, Puckapunyal, Australia (2007). The white writing on the turret is to inform cargo handlers that it is not to be transported by sea as deck cargo.

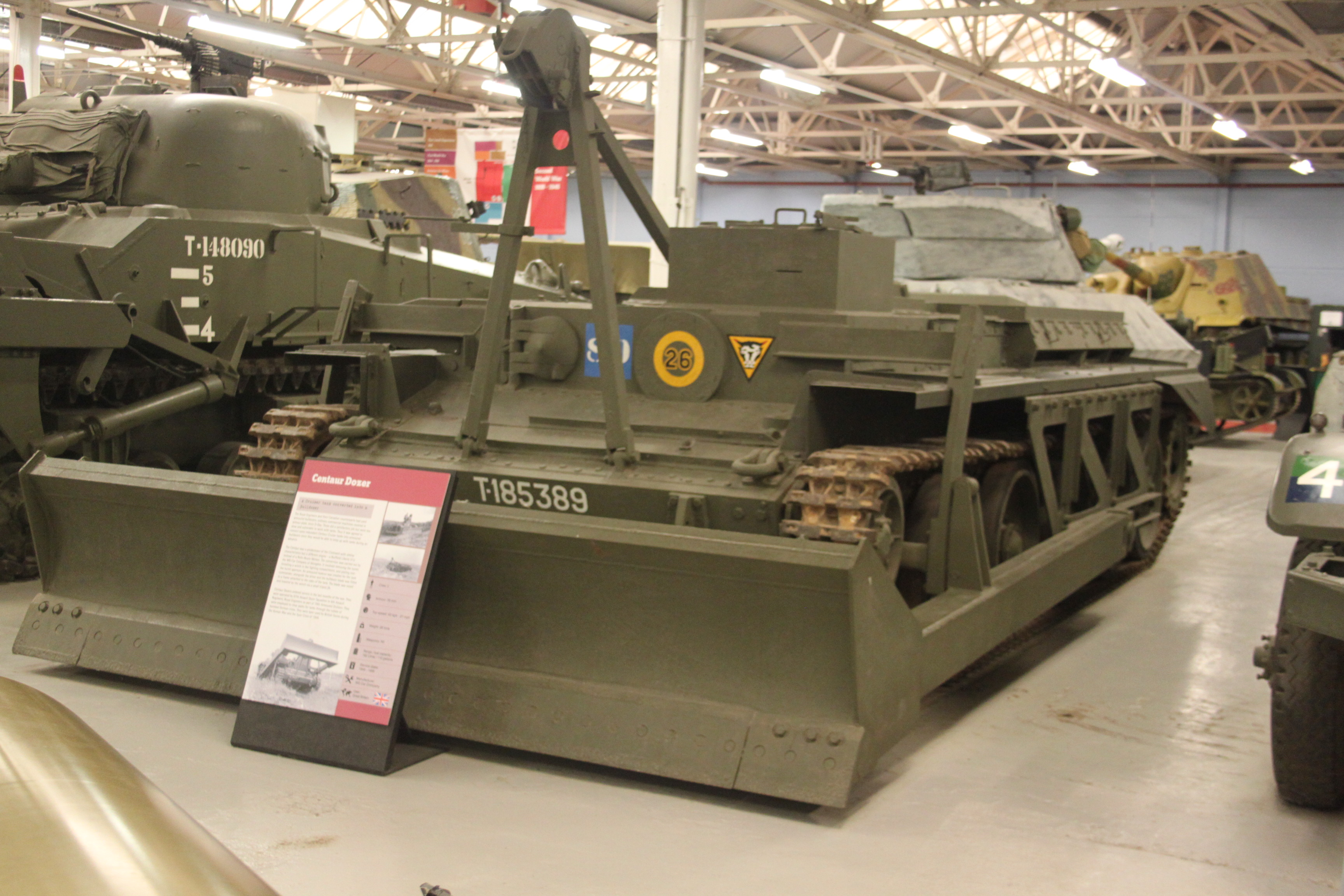
Centaur Dozer at the Tank Museum

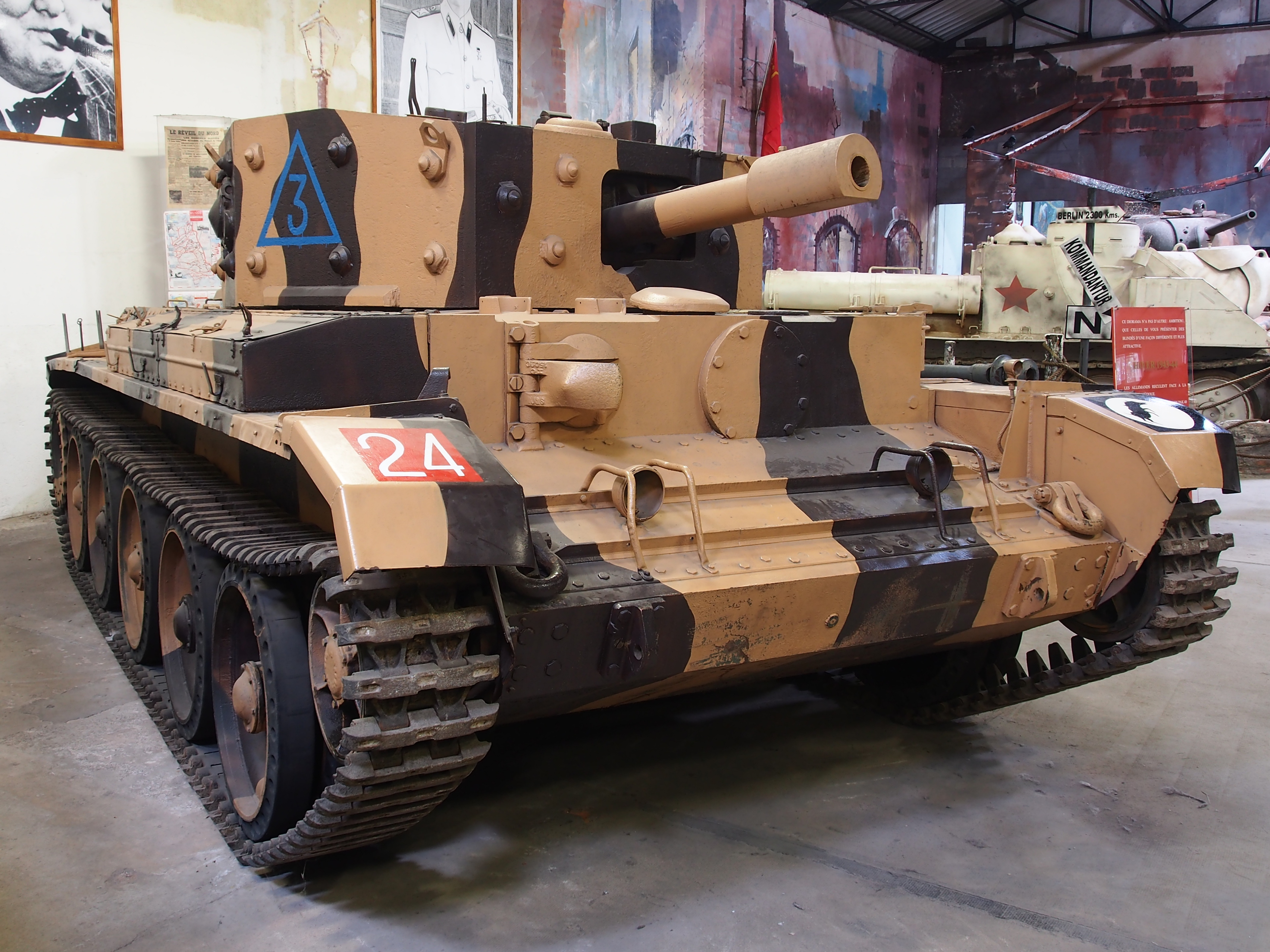
Tank Mark VIII Centaur in the Musée des Blindés, France

== See also ==
- Rhino tank
- Vickers Tank Periscope MK.IV

=== Tanks of comparable role, performance, and era ===
- Australia Thunderbolt
- Canadian Grizzly I
- German Panzer IV
- Hungarian Turán III
- Italian Carro Armato P 40
- Italian P43 (proposal)
- Japanese Type 3 Chi-Nu
- Romanian 1942 medium tank (proposal)
- Soviet T-34
- Swedish Stridsvagn m/42
- United States M4 Sherman
