= 1st Polish Corps (Polish Armed Forces in the West) =

I Corps
- I Korpus Pancerno-Motorowy
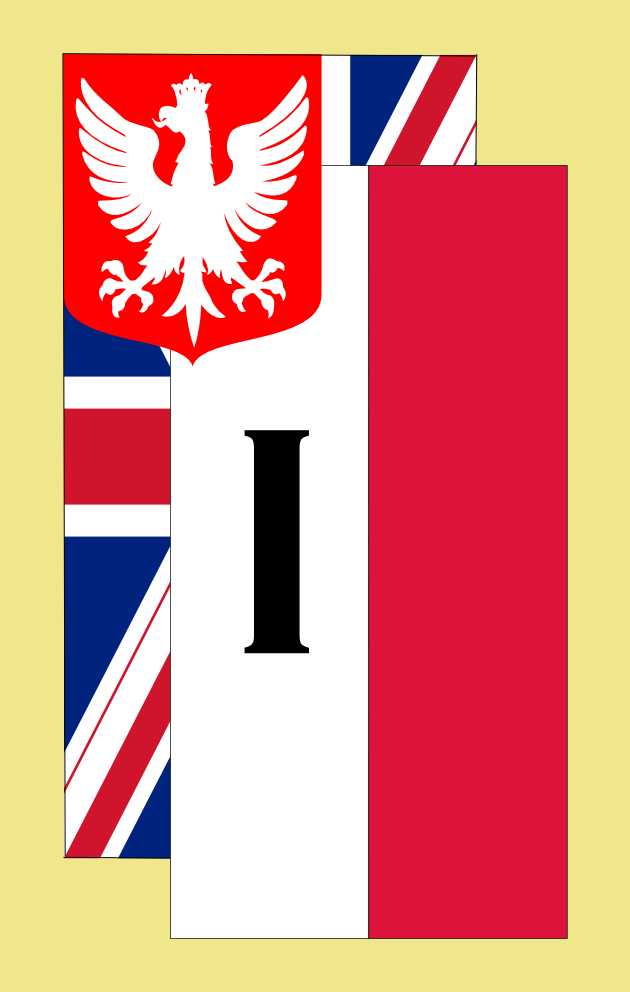
- Active: 28 September 1940–1947
- Country: Poland
- Allegiance: Polish government-in-exile
- Branch: Polish Armed Forces in the West
- Engagements: World War II

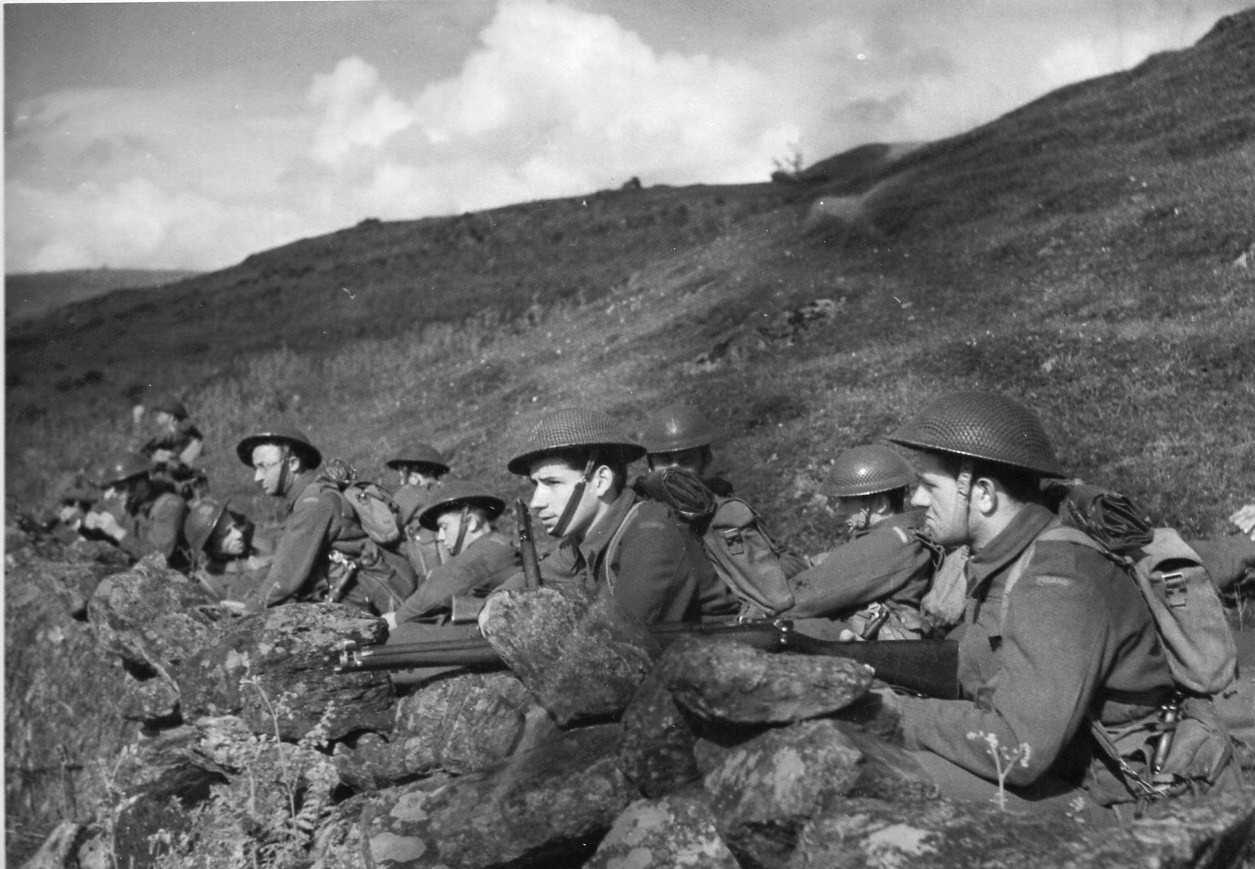
Soldiers of Polish I Corps in Scotland, 1941

The Polish I Corps (Polish: I Korpus Polski; from 1942, Polish I Armored-Mechanized Corps, Polish: I Korpus Pancerno-Motorowy) was a tactical unit of the Polish Armed Forces in the West during World War II.

It was formed in the United Kingdom on 28 September 1940. It was subordinate to the Scottish Command, and the Corps HQ was at Moncreiffe House in Perthshire (near the Bridge of Earn). It numbered 3,498 officers and 10,884 soldiers.

The Corps was initially formed to protect a 200 kilometres (120 mi) stretch of Scottish shore between the Firth of Forth and Montrose against a possible German invasion of Britain. (Note: At the time the defence plan "Julius Caesar" sought to prevent ports from capture by German parachutists and so prevent any seaborne invasion from landing. On 1 May 1940, the 9th (Highland) Infantry Division was assigned to Scottish Command and covered the entire east coast of Scotland.) Later it became the logistical base for Polish Army units fighting as part of the Allies.

== Operations ==
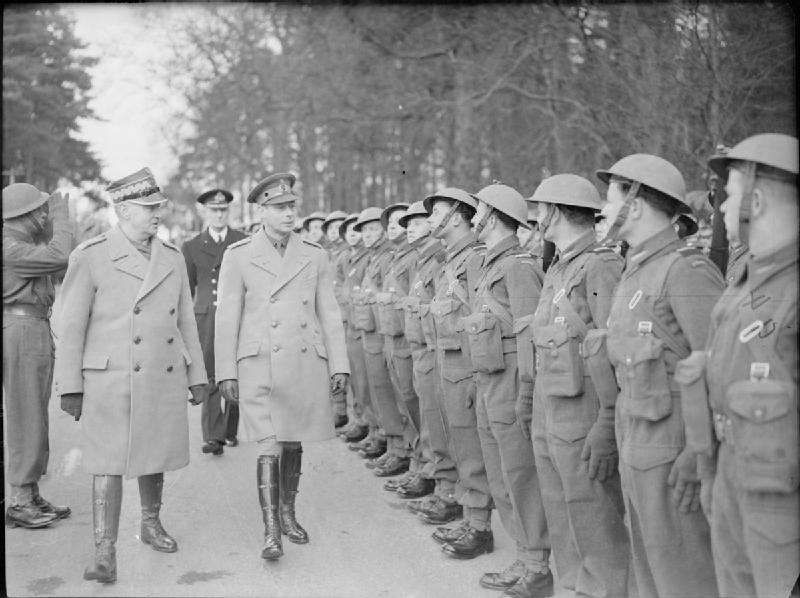
King George VI and General Władysław Sikorski, Prime Minister of the Polish government-in-exile, inspecting a guard of honour of the 1st Polish Corps at Glamis, Scotland, 8 March 1941.

For most of its existence the core of the Corps was composed of a variety of en cadre units. Once these had been formed into full tactical units, they were dispatched to the fronts separately, as parts of other Allied commands. The units created out of First Corps' nominal infantry brigades were 1st Armoured Division, 1st Independent Parachute Brigade, 1st Reconnaissance Regiment, and a variety of other detachments.

The main units of the Corps fought separately, and were grouped together mostly for administrative purposes. After the surrender of Germany in May 1945, the Corps started to act as a single unit. Its two largest components were joined together in northern Germany, near the port of Wilhelmshaven, and the Corps took part in the occupation of Germany.

Like most other units of the Polish Armed Forces in the West, it was disbanded in 1947, with personnel transferred to the Polish Resettlement Corps.

== Commanders ==
It was commanded by generals Marian Kukiel (1940-1942), Mieczysław Boruta-Spiechowicz (1942-1943 & 1943-1945), Józef Zając (March-August 1943), and Stanisław Maczek (1945-1947).

== Subordinate units ==
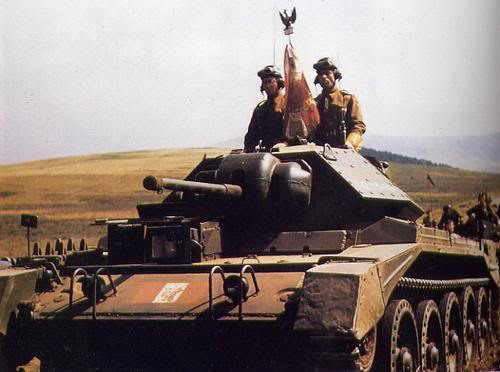
Crusader tank of Polish 1st Armoured Division near Haddington 1943

Initially the Corps included the HQ, two Rifle Brigades (numbered 1 and 2), five en cadre Rifle Brigades (3, 4, 5, 7 and 8, usually battalion-sized), as well as service units. By late 1940 the Corps had over 14,000 men at arms. The 2nd Rifle Brigade was reformed into the 10th Armored Brigade on 3 October 1940. In 1942, this formation was expanded to the 1st Armoured Division. The 4th Brigade became the 1st Independent Parachute Brigade on 9 October 1941. 3rd, 5th and 7th Brigades formed the Training Brigade on 6 December 1941.

The 1st Tank Regiment (1 Pułk Czołgów), was created in October 1940. On 1 September 1941, it was renamed the 16th Independent Armoured Brigade. On 25 February 1942 the brigade was assigned to the 1st Armoured Division. In the short period of September to October 1943, the brigade was merged with the 10th Armoured Brigade to form the 10/16th Armored Brigade. In November 1943 the brigade was recreated as the 16th (cadre) Independent Armoured Brigade. This unit was not committed to combat on the continent. Until February 1945, it was assigned to the 2nd (cadre) Armoured Grenadier Division.

During combat operations on the continent, the 1st Armoured Division and the 1st Parachute Brigade were assigned to other Allied commands. 1st Parachute Brigade was attached to the First Allied Airborne Army while 1st Armoured Division was under the command of the First Canadian Army.

At the end of the war, the Corps comprised the 1st Armoured Division, the 1st Independent Parachute Brigade, the 4th Infantry Division, and the 16th Independent Armoured Brigade.
