= 16th Independent Armoured Brigade =

16th Independent Armoured Brigade Polish: 16 Brygada Pancerna
- Active: 1941-1947
- Allegiance: Poland
- Branch: Armour
- Part of: I Corps in the West (Poland); 1st Armoured Division (Poland)

Insignia
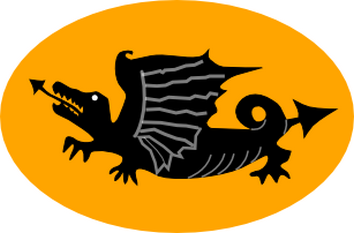
- 16th Independent Armoured Brigade Emblem

16th Armoured Brigade (Polish: 16 Brygada Pancerna) was a unit of the Polish Armed Forces in the West. The Brigade was formed on September 1, 1941, from the 1st Tank Regiment (1 Pułk Czołgów), which was created as a part of the Polish I Corps in October 1940. On February 24, 1942, the Brigade was assigned to the 1st Armoured Division. In the short period of September to October 1943, the Brigade was merged with the 10th Armoured Brigade to form the 10/16th Armored Brigade. In November 1943, the Brigade was recreated as the 16th Independent Armoured Brigade (16 Samodzielna Brygada Pancerna).
