= AEC armoured car =

British heavy armoured car

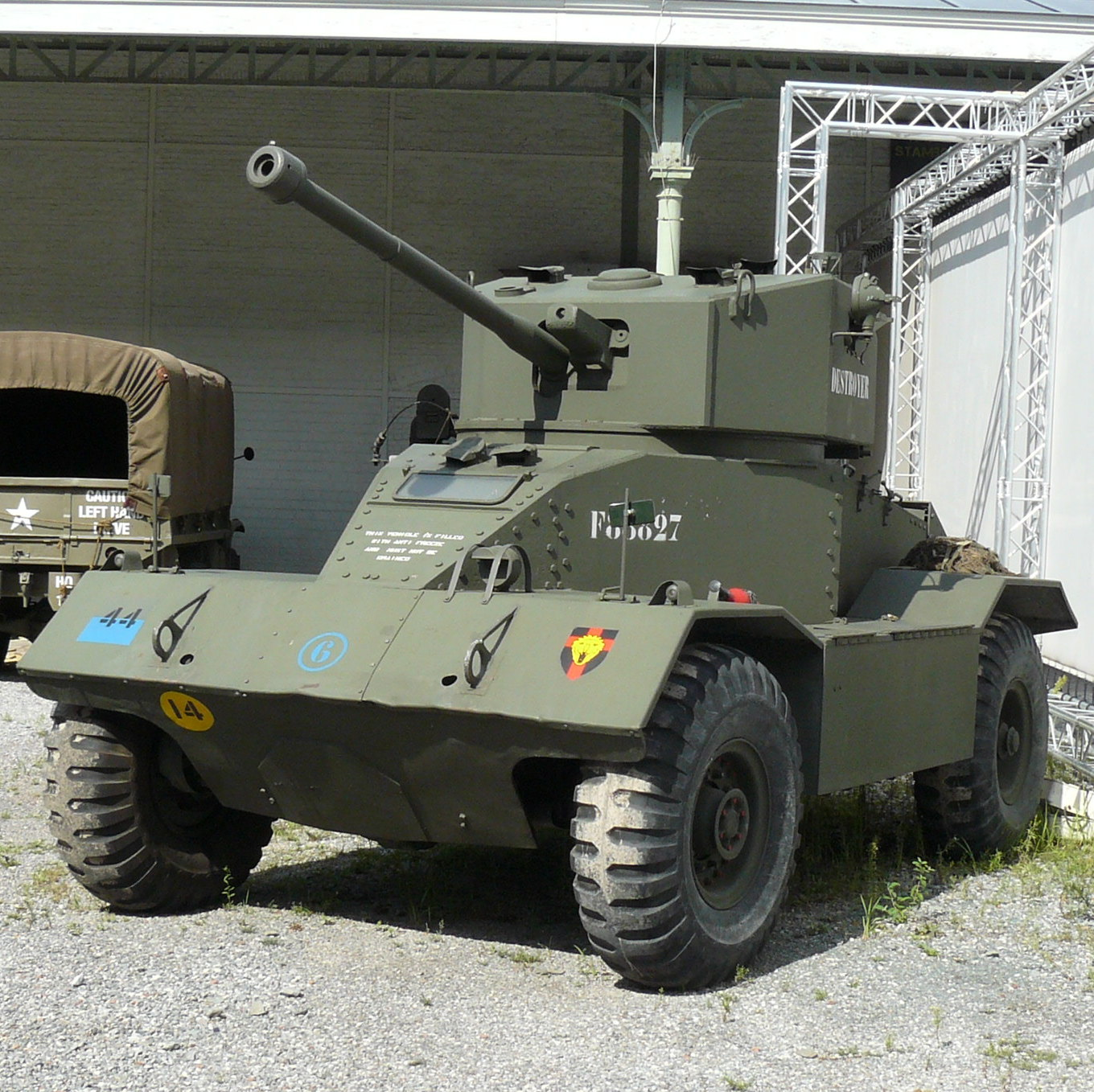
- Place of origin: United Kingdom

Production history
- Produced: 1941 onwards
- No. built: 629

Specifications (Mk I, Mk II & III)
- Mass: Mk I: 11 long tons (12 short tons; 11 t); Mk II, III: 12.7 long tons (14.2 short tons; 12.9 t)
- Length: 17 ft (5.2 m)
- Width: 9 ft (2.7 m)
- Height: 8 ft 4 in (2.54 m)
- Crew: Mk I: 3; Mk II, III: 4
- Armour: 16–65 mm (0.63–2.56 in)
- Main armament: Mk I: QF 2 pounder; Mk II: QF 6 pounder; Mk III: QF 75 mm; AA prototype: twin Oerlikon 20mm cannons
- Secondary armament: 1 × Besa machine gun, 1 × Bren light machine gun.
- Engine: Mk I: AEC 195 diesel; Mk II, III: AEC 197 diesel; 105/158 bhp (78/118 kW)
- Power/weight: Mk I: 9.5 hp/tonne; Mk II, III: 12.4 hp/tonne
- Suspension: wheel 4×4
- Operational range: 250 mi (400 km)
- Maximum speed: 36–41 mph (58–66 km/h)

AEC armoured cars are a series of British heavy armoured cars built by the Associated Equipment Company (AEC) during the Second World War.

The AEC armoured car came about following British experience in the Western Desert against Italian armoured cars. British armoured cars were only armed with light and heavy machine guns and the army was fitting captured Italian and German 20 mm or larger autocannon to have enough firepower when meeting enemy reconnaissance vehicles.

The Daimler armoured car was under development with a 40 mm 2-pounder gun as used on British tanks but no armoured cars were envisaged with the armour as well as the armament of a tank. AEC undertook development privately of a vehicle based on one of the lorry designs (an artillery tractor) that would have armour equivalent to a contemporary cruiser tank.

== Design and development ==
AEC of Southall, England was a manufacturer of truck and bus chassis and its Matador artillery tractor was used for towing medium field and heavy anti-aircraft guns. The armoured car based on the Matador artillery chassis was developed initially as a private venture and a mock-up was shown to officials in 1941 at Horse Guards Parade in London, where it made a favourable impression on Winston Churchill and following an initial contract for 120, 629 vehicles were produced in 1942–1943.

AEC tried to build an armoured car with fire power and protection comparable to those of contemporary British cruiser tanks. The first version used the turret of a Valentine Mk II infantry tank complete with the 2 pounder gun. Subsequent versions received a 6 pounder or a 75 mm gun in a custom-built turret. The vehicle also carried a single Besa machine gun, a 2-inch (51 mm) bomb thrower (smoke grenade discharger) and a No. 19 radio set. Mark I vehicles had a Bren light machine gun for defence against aircraft, later vehicles received a "PLM" mounting one or two Vickers K machine guns. The turret was electrically driven with a manual traverse option.

The driver was provided with two periscopes for vision when closed up; otherwise he could raise his seat to see over the glacis.

The engine was mounted at a downwards angle reducing the angle on the transfer shafts and height over the rear hull deck. In normal on road use only the front wheels were driven.

== Service history ==
The Mk I was first used in combat in the North African Campaign late in 1942, where a few vehicles were reportedly fitted with a Crusader tank turret mounting a 6-pounder gun. The Mk II and Mk III took part in the fighting in Europe with British and British Indian Army units, often together with the American-supplied Staghound armoured car. The AEC armoured car with 75 mm gun replaced US half-track 75 mm self-propelled guns in the four fighting squadrons of some armoured car regiments. The vehicle remained in service after the end of the war until replaced by the Alvis Saladin. The Lebanese Army used the car at least until 1976. From 1956 some AEC turrets were added to Lebanese Staghound armoured cars.

== Variants ==
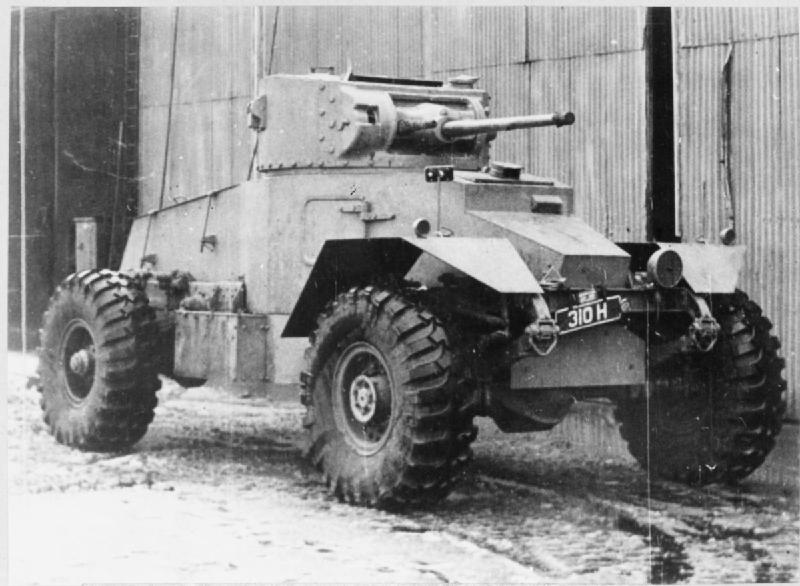
AEC Mk I Armoured Car.

Mk I
original version with turret from a Valentine tank, 129 built. Some in Middle East had 6-pounder gun fitted
Mk II
larger turret for three man crew with a 6 pounder gun, redesigned front hull, 158 hp (118 kW) diesel engine.
Mk III
"Close Support Armoured Car", a Mk II with 6 pounder replaced by the QF 75 mm gun which had the same mountings.
AA prototype
Turret similar to Crusader AA tank turret with twin Oerlikon 20 mm cannon capable of high elevation to engage enemy aircraft. Prototype built in 1944 but did not enter production due to Allied air superiority in Northern Europe.

AEC Armoured Car at Bastogne Barracks.

== Operators ==
=== Former operators ===
- Iraq
- Lebanon
- United Kingdom
  - British Raj

== Sources ==
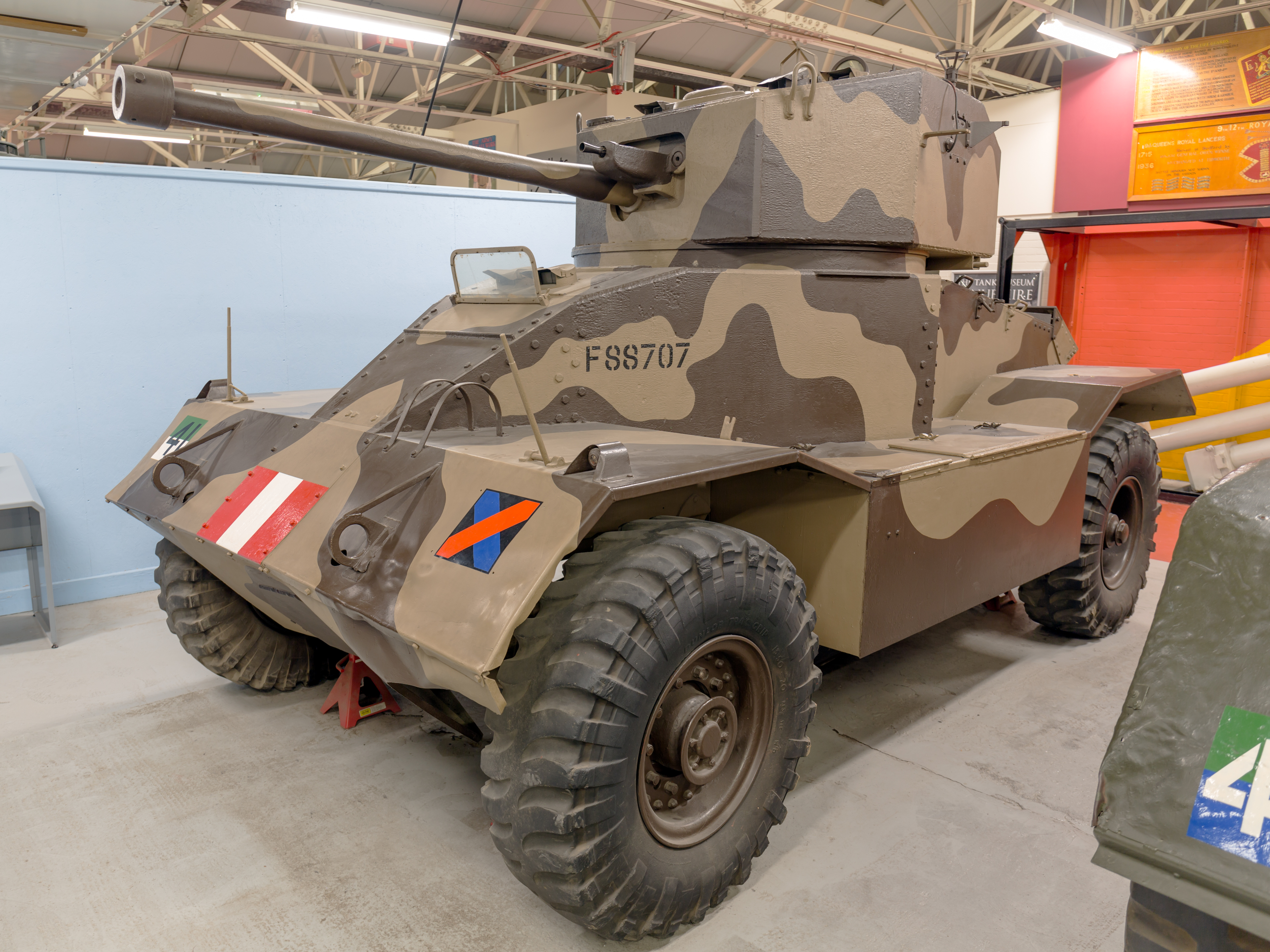
AEC Armoured Car Mark II

- George Forty - World War Two Armoured Fighting Vehicles and Self-Propelled Artillery, Osprey Publishing 1996, ISBN 1-85532-582-9.
- I. Moschanskiy - Armored vehicles of the Great Britain 1939-1945 part 2, Modelist-Konstruktor, Bronekollektsiya 1999-02 (И. Мощанский - Бронетанковая техника Великобритании 1939-1945 часть 2, Моделист-Конструктор, Бронеколлекция 1999-02).
- B.T. White Armoured Cars (AFV Weapons Profile No. 21) Profile Publishing.
