= Coventry armoured car =

British four-wheel drive armoured car

Coventry Armoured Car
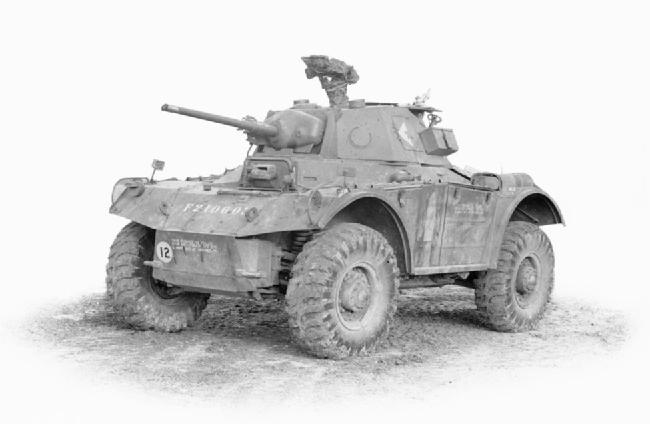
- Type: Armoured car

Production history
- Manufacturer: Rootes Group
- No. built: 220

Specifications
- Mass: 11.5 long tons (11.7 t)
- Length: 15 ft 7 in (4.75 m)
- Width: 8 ft 9 in (2.67 m)
- Height: 7 ft 9 in (2.36 m)
- Crew: Mk I: 4, Mk II: 3
- Armour: up to 14 mm (0.55 in)
- Main armament: Mk I: QF 2-pounder Mk II: QF 75 mm
- Secondary armament: 7.92mm Besa machine gun (coaxial)
- Engine: Hercules RXLD 6-cylinder petrol engine 175 hp (130 kW)
- Power/weight: 16.9 hp/tonne
- Suspension: Wheeled 4 × 4
- Operational range: 250 mi (400 km)
- Maximum speed: 41 mph (66 km/h)

The Coventry armoured car (AFV W.19) was a British four wheel drive (4 × 4) armoured fighting vehicle developed at the end of the Second World War as a potential replacement for the Humber and Daimler armoured cars. The Coventry was intended as a common design to be built by the companies manufacturing the two armoured cars.

== Development ==
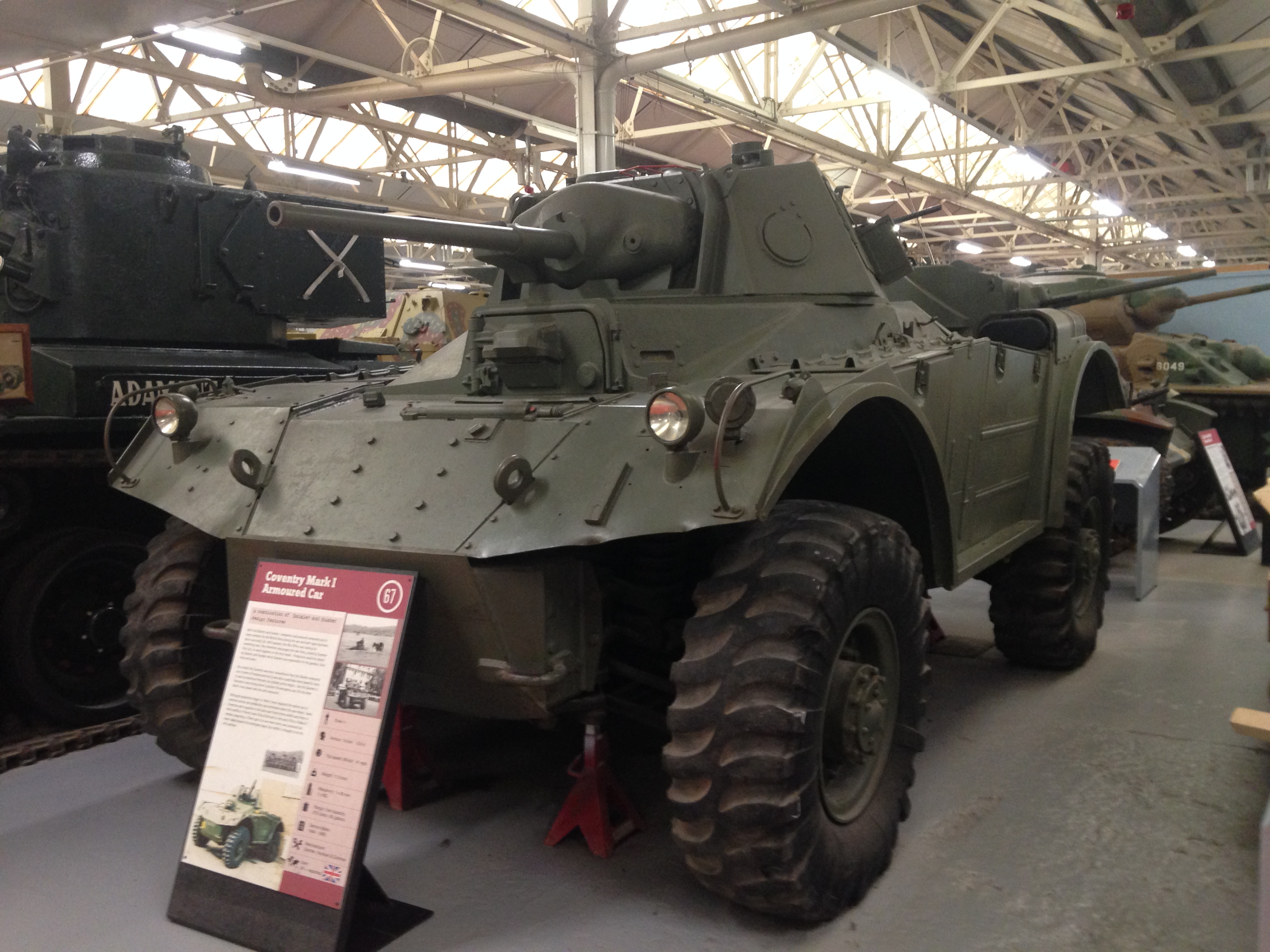
A Coventry in The Tank Museum, Bovington

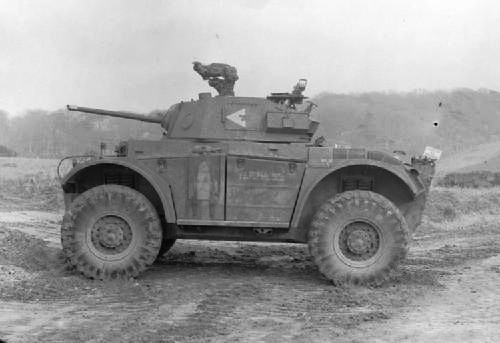
A Coventry in action.

The Coventry was a combined effort between Daimler Company and the Rootes Group to produce a standard armoured car design which could be produced by both companies. Rootes had larger production capacity than Daimler but the Humber armoured car was a more complex design than the Daimler. The overall design work of AFV W.19 as it was initially known was by Humber at Coventry with Daimler (also in Coventry) providing suspension and steering, and Commer (one of the Rootes companies) the axles and transmission.

The Coventry was an advanced design and featured a similar layout to the more compact Daimler, but with a more conventional suspension and drive system. It included a second set of driving controls at the rear, inherited from the Daimler, to allow rapid disengagement in combat. The engine was American Hercules connected to a central transfer box with transmission to the front and rear differentials on the axles.

There were two production versions. The Mark 1 employed a three-man turret with a 40mm QF 2-pounder gun and a 7.92 mm coaxial Besa machine gun.

The prototypes - two each- from Daimler and Humber were produced with a 2-pounder gun and tested in 1944. In 1943, orders were placed for 1,700 vehicles (1,150 from Rootes and 550 from Daimler) that were to be able to carry the 57mm QF 6-pounder gun. A version - AFV W90 - with a larger turret with a 75 mm gun but one fewer crewman was planned and 900 of these ordered.

Deliveries of the Coventry Mk 1, from the Humber assembly line, began in June 1944 and 63 vehicles had been produced by the end of the year. It was decided, in 1943, that production of the Daimler would be continued instead of the Coventry armoured car replacing it. As a result, the order for the 2-pounder Coventry was reduced to 300 that would be sent to India. The 75 mm armed Mark II did not enter production.

Output concluded with a further 220 vehicles in 1945. The Coventry was deployed by the British Army, but they arrived too late for wartime service. Some of these units were sold to France and later saw action against the Viet Minh during the Indochina War.

== Sources ==
- Fletcher, David (1989). Universal Tank: British Armour in the Second World War - Part 2. HMSO. ISBN 0-11-290534-X.
- Leland Ness (2002) Jane's World War II Tanks and Fighting Vehicles: The Complete Guide, HarperCollins, London and New York, ISBN 0-00-711228-9
- White, B.T. (1970). Armoured Cars: Guy, Daimler, Humber, AEC. AFV Weapons Profile No. 21. Profile Publications.
