= Guy armoured car =

Guy armoured car Armoured Car, Guy Guy Light Tank (Wheeled)
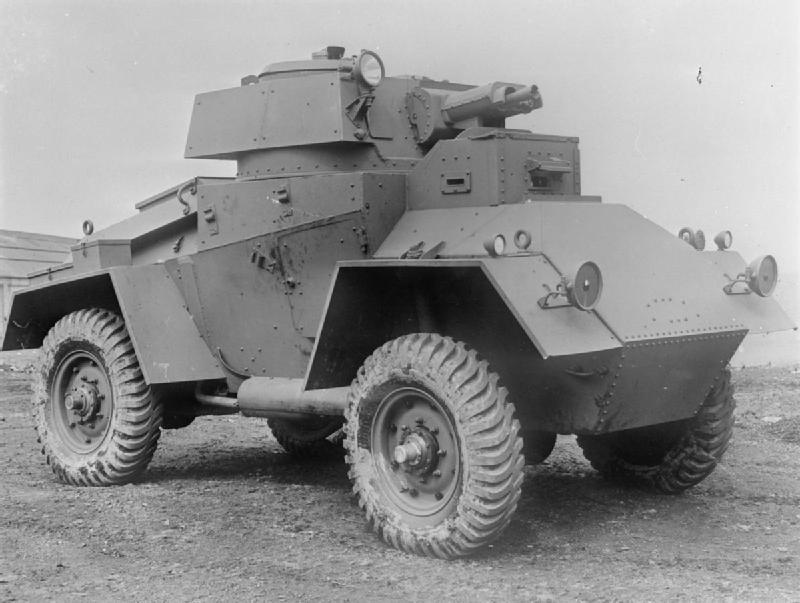
- Guy Mk I
- Place of origin: UK

Service history
- Wars: Second World War

Production history
- Designed: 1938
- Manufacturer: Guy Motors
- Produced: 1939–1940
- No. built: 101 (50 Mk.1, 51 Mk.1A)

Specifications (Mark I)
- Mass: 5.2 long tons (5.3 t)
- Length: 13 ft 6 in (4.11 m)
- Width: 6 ft 9 in (2.06 m)
- Height: 7 ft 6 in (2.29 m)
- Crew: 3
- Armour: up to 15 mm (0.59 in)
- Main armament: Vickers .50 machine gun
- Secondary armament: .303 inch Vickers machine gun
- Engine: Meadows 4ELA 4-cyl petrol engine 55 hp (41 kW)
- Power/weight: 10.6 hp/tonne
- Transmission: 4 forward, 1 reverse gear
- Suspension: 4 × 4 wheel
- Operational range: 210 mi (340 km)
- Maximum speed: 40 mph (64 km/h)

The Guy Armoured Car (Note: British classified armoured cars making a distinction between "Armoured Car", known as "Light Tank (Wheeled)" until 1941 and, from 1939, "Scout Car" which were small turretless vehicles for liaison between units and unarmed scouting. There were also Light Reconnaissance Cars for medium range reconnaissance with Reconnaissance Regiments of infantry divisions.) was a British armoured car produced in limited numbers during Second World War. The car saw limited action during the Battle of France.

The manufacturer had insufficient capacity for production of the armoured car alongside their artillery tractors, so the design and construction techniques were passed to Rootes and used as a basis for the Humber Armoured Car.

== Development ==
In 1938, Guy Motors built five Guy Quad armoured car prototypes to a design by the Woolwich Arsenal based on the Quad Ant artillery tractor chassis. In early 1938, a number of different 4×4 chassis from British and foreign manufacturers had been tested to see which was the best for development of a new line of armoured cars to replace the older designs in use. By September, three armoured cars had been built by Guy. While chassis with more advanced features were seen as having better potential, however, in order to get production under way the Guy chassis was preferred.

The vehicles successfully completed troop trials and from 1939–1940 a further 101 of the armoured cars – initially designated "Tank, Light, (Wheeled) Mark I" – were produced. While the contract specification had been for riveted construction, they were actually welded following Guy's suggestion that this would be more suitable and effective. To that end, they developed the necessary techniques including rotating jigs, which meant the bodies and turrets could be produced quicker and cheaper. The Royal Commission for Awards to Inventors recognised this after the war.

The vehicle had a welded hull (making it the first British armoured car with an all-welded construction) with a sloped glacis plate. Above the centre of the hull was mounted a turret. Armament for the first model consisted of a Vickers .50 inch (12.7 mm) machine gun in the turret and a co-axial .303 inch (7.7 mm) Vickers machine gun. The Ia model replaced the Vickers with a 15 mm Besa machine gun and 7.92 mm Besa was used as the secondary weapon. The engine was located at the rear. The vehicle carried a No. 19 radio set.

The body of the Guy vehicle formed the basis of the later Humber Armoured Car, which employed a new chassis.

== Service history ==
Six cars were sent to France with the British Expeditionary Force (BEF), but were lost when France fell to the Germans. Four cars, two each with the 12th Lancers and 2nd Northamptonshire Yeomanry, had their guns removed and additional seats fitted in 1940 for use in the Coats Mission to evacuate King George VI, Queen Elizabeth, Princess Elizabeth and Princess Margaret in the event of German invasion. The rest served with different British Army, Belgian Army, Danish and Dutch units stationed in Britain. By 1943, they were replaced by more modern vehicles.

== Variants ==
- Mk I – original version. 50 units built.
- Mk IA – was armed with Besa 15 mm and 7.92 mm Besa air-cooled machine guns instead of the Vickers. 51 units built.

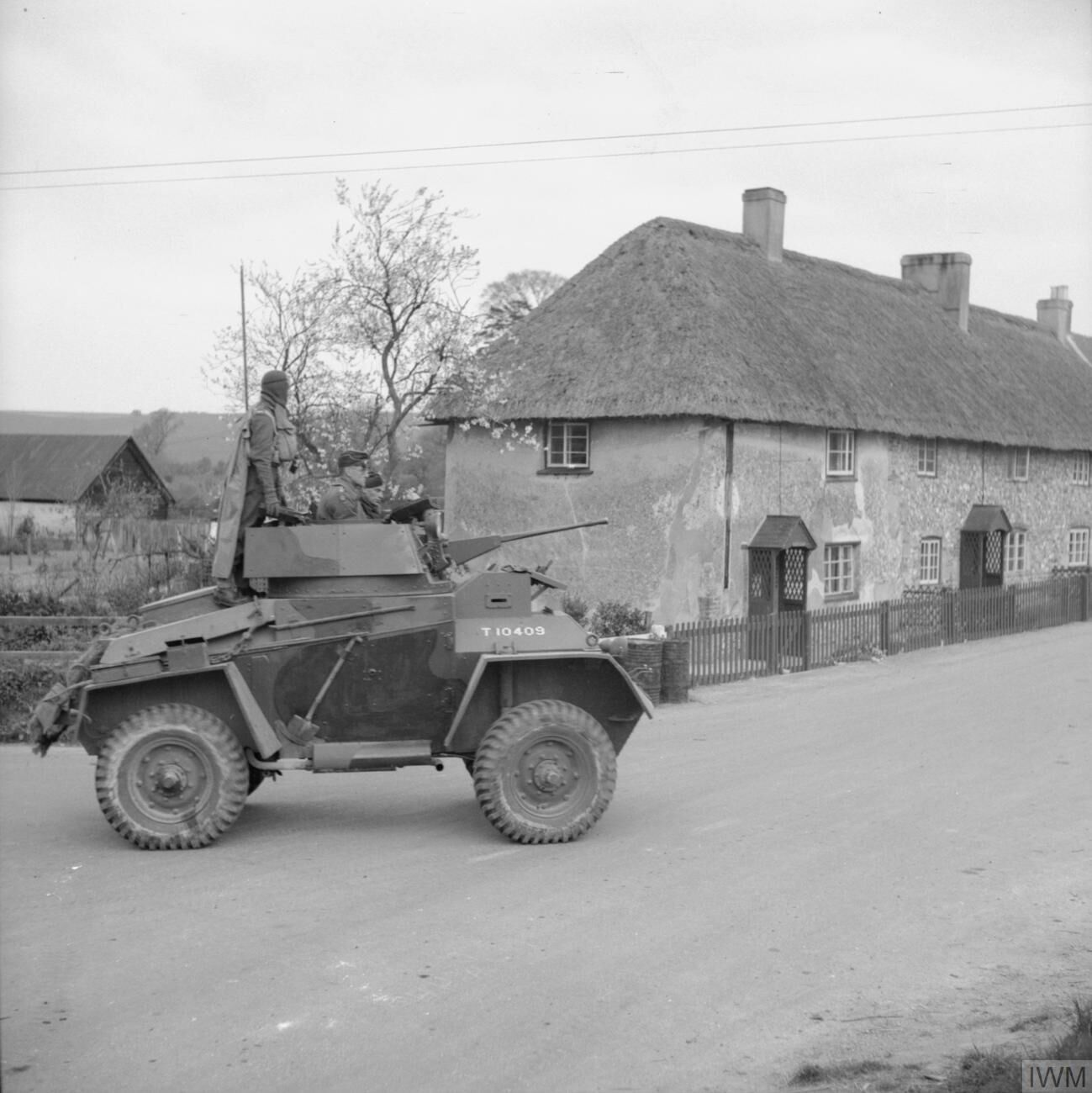
Guy Mk IA during anti-invasion exercises in Southern Command, 7 May 1941. Note the longer barrel of the 15 mm Besa MG.

== Sources ==
- White, B T Armoured Cars - Daimler, Guy, Daimler, Humber, AEC AFV Profile No 21, Profile Publishing, Windsor
- George Forty - World War Two Armoured Fighting Vehicles and Self-Propelled Artillery, Osprey Publishing 1996, ISBN 1-85532-582-9.
- I. Moschanskiy - Armored vehicles of the Great Britain 1939-1945 part 2, Modelist-Konstruktor, Bronekollektsiya 1999-02 (И. Мощанский - Бронетанковая техника Великобритании 1939-1945 часть 2, Моделист-Конструктор, Бронеколлекция 1999-02).
- Armoured Car, Guy Mark 1 (E1965.44) - Accession record at Tank Museum
