= Coats Mission =

Former British army unit for evacuating the Royal Family

The Coats Mission was a special British army unit established in England in 1940 for the purpose of evacuating King George VI, Queen Elizabeth, and their immediate family, in the event of a German invasion of Britain during the Second World War. It was led by Major James Coats, MC, Coldstream Guards, later Lieutenant-Colonel Sir James Coats, Bt.

The force consisted of:

- A special company of the Coldstream Guards. There were five officers and 124 Guardsmen based at Bushey Hall Golf Club. Every officer and Guardsman was personally interviewed by Major Coats before being assigned to the company.
- A troop of the 12th Lancers based at Wellington Barracks commanded by Lieutenant W.A. Morris, known as the Morris Detachment. They were equipped with two Daimler armoured cars and four Guy armoured cars. Their role was to evacuate the King and Queen. In addition, the four Rolls-Royce armoured cars based at the Royal Mews would be attached to the troop in the event of an evacuation.
- A troop of the 2nd Northamptonshire Yeomanry based at Windsor Castle commanded by Lieutenant Michael Tomkin. They were equipped with four Guy armoured cars. Their role was to evacuate Princess Elizabeth and Princess Margaret.
- A Royal Army Service Corps section of 12 men with four Leyland Tiger buses based at Bushey Hall Golf Club. Their role was to transport the Coldstream Guards company.
- Military Police from the Provost Company of the 1st London Division for escort and traffic control, commanded by Captain Sir Malcolm Campbell, MBE. At Campbell's suggestion they were equipped with fast Norton International Model 30 racing motorcycles rather than the standard military Norton WD16H of the era.

Initially, two of the Guy armoured cars in each troop had their guns removed and additional seats installed to carry members of the Royal Family. These were replaced by four specially built Daimler armoured limousines.

Several country houses in remote locations, reportedly including Newby Hall, North Yorkshire; Pitchford Hall, Shropshire; Madresfield Court (Earl Beauchamp's home in Worcestershire); and a fourth, unnamed house (possibly Bevere Manor, Worcestershire) were designated as refuges. Madresfield Court reportedly replaced Croome Court, Worcester (the home of the Earl of Coventry), in 1940. It was also a safe house for King George III in the late eighteenth century, in the event of an invasion by Napoleon.

Should invading German forces have reached the Midlands, the Royal Family would have been taken to Liverpool and evacuated by sea to Canada. Hatley Castle on Vancouver Island was purchased in 1940 as part of this contingency. If that last resort option had been required, the family were to travel to Holyhead for transport to Canada by the Royal Navy.

The mission was disbanded in 1942 and the task of evacuating the Royal Family in an emergency was transferred to a detachment from the Household Cavalry Composite Regiment.

== See also ==
- Operation Candid, a Cold War plan to evacuate the Royal Family in the event of nuclear war
