= Daimler armoured car =

British armoured car

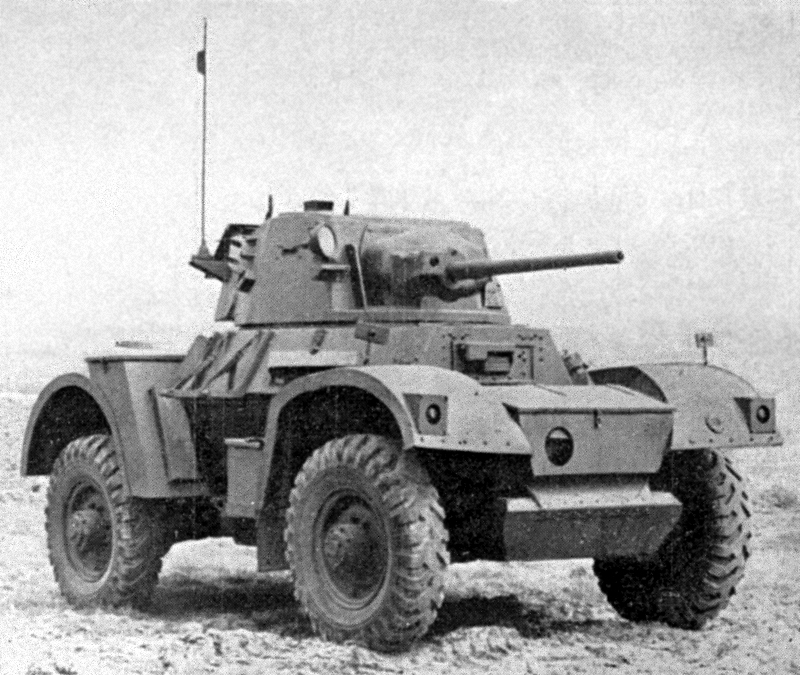
- Daimler armoured car Mk II
- Type: Armoured car
- Place of origin: United Kingdom

Production history
- Manufacturer: Daimler
- No. built: 2,694

Specifications
- Mass: 7.85 t (battle order)
- Length: 13 feet 1 inch (4 m)
- Width: 8 feet 1 inch (2.46 m)
- Height: 7 feet 5 inches (2.26 m)
- Crew: 3
- Armour: 7–16 mm
- Main armament: Ordnance QF 2 pounder; 52 rounds
- Secondary armament: 1 × coaxial 7.92 mm Besa machine gun; 2,700 rounds; 1 × 0.303 (7.7 mm) Bren light machine gun AA
- Engine: Daimler 27 4.1 litre 6-cylinder petrol 102 hp (76 kW)
- Power/weight: 12.99 hp/tonne
- Transmission: 5 speed (both directions) with fluid flywheel
- Suspension: 4 × 4 wheel, independent coil spring
- Operational range: 200 miles (320 km)
- Maximum speed: 50.0 miles per hour (80.4 km/h)

The Daimler armoured car was a successful British armoured car design of the Second World War that continued in service into the 1950s. It was designed for armed reconnaissance and liaison purposes. During the postwar era, it doubled as an internal security vehicle in a number of countries.

Former British Daimler armoured cars were exported to various Commonwealth of Nations member states throughout the 1950s and 1960s. In 2012, some were still being operated by the Qatari Army.

== Design and development ==
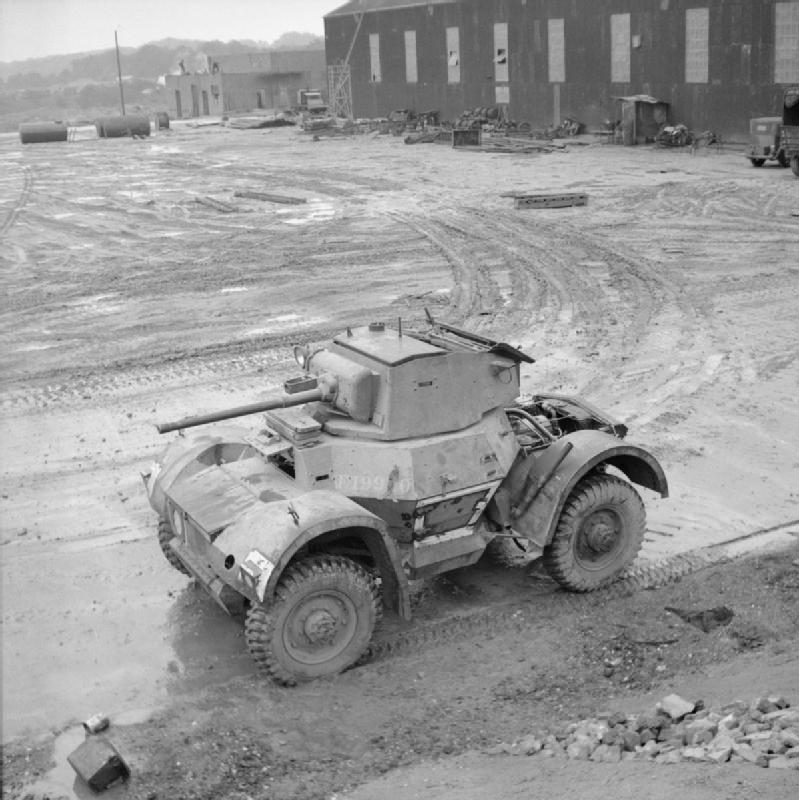
1939 air recognition overhead view

The Daimler armoured car was a parallel development to the Daimler Dingo scout car, a small armoured vehicle for scouting and liaison roles. It was another Birmingham Small Arms Company design. A larger version designed on the same layout as the Dingo fitted with the turret similar to that of the Mark VII 'Tetrarch' Light Tank and a more powerful engine.

Like the scout car, it incorporated some of the most advanced design concepts of the time and is considered one of the best British armoured fighting vehicles of the Second World War. The 95 hp (71 kW) engine was at the rear linked through a fluid flywheel to a Wilson preselector gearbox and then a H-drive arrangement with prop-shafts to each wheel. Four wheel steering similar to early models of the scout car was considered but not implemented following experience with the Dingo.

The prototypes had been produced in 1939, but problems with the transmission caused by the weight of the vehicle delayed service entry until mid-1941. The Daimler Company built 2,694 armoured cars. The Daimler had full independent suspension and four wheel drive. Epicyclic gearing in the wheel hubs enabled a very low ratio in bottom gear – it was credited with managing 1:2 inclines. The rugged nature combined with reliability made it ideal for reconnaissance and escort work. The variant of the turret and the 2-pounder gun were also used on the Light Tank Mk VII Tetrarch.

== Service history ==
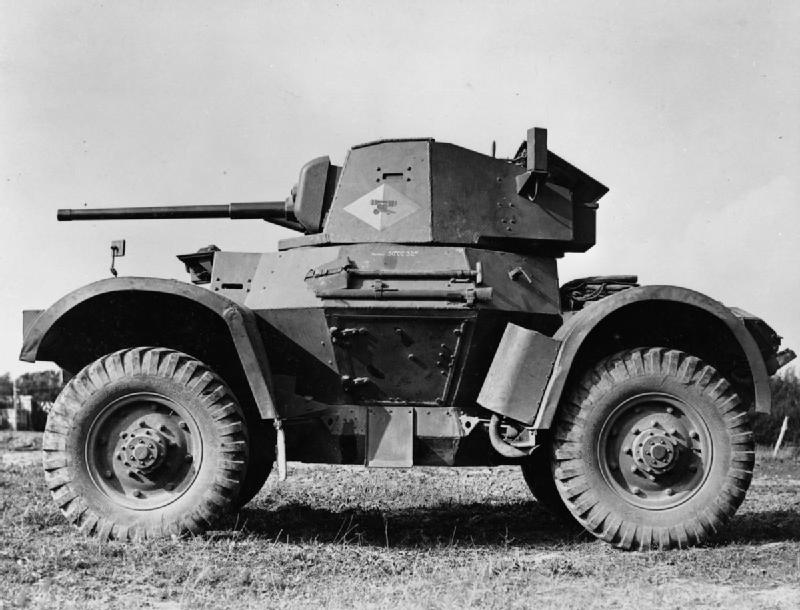
Daimler Mk I armoured car

The Daimler saw action in North Africa with the 11th Hussars and the Derbyshire Yeomanry. It was also used in Europe and a few vehicles reached the South-East Asia theatre. A typical late war reconnaissance troop in north-west Europe would have two Daimler armoured cars and two Daimler Dingo scout cars.

A British Indian Army armoured car regiment, the 16th Light Cavalry, which formed part of Fourteenth Army troops was partly equipped with Daimlers and served in the reconquest of Burma.

To improve the gun performance, some Daimlers in the European theatre had their 2-pounders fitted with the Littlejohn adaptor, which worked on the squeeze bore principle. This increased the gun's theoretical armour penetration and would allow it to penetrate the side or rear armour of some German tanks.

Daimlers were used by the territorial units of the British Army until the 1960s, outlasting their planned replacement, the Coventry armoured car. It was still being used, along with Daimler Dingoes, by B Squadron, 11th Hussars in Northern Ireland as late as January 1960.

An Indian Army regiment, 63 Cavalry, was raised with Humber armoured cars in one of its squadrons. This squadron was later hived off as an independent reconnaissance squadron and the integral squadron re-raised with Daimlers. In the early sixties, Humbers and Daimlers of the Indian Army formed the mounts of the President's Bodyguard and were deployed in the defence of Chushul during the 1962 Sino-Indian War.

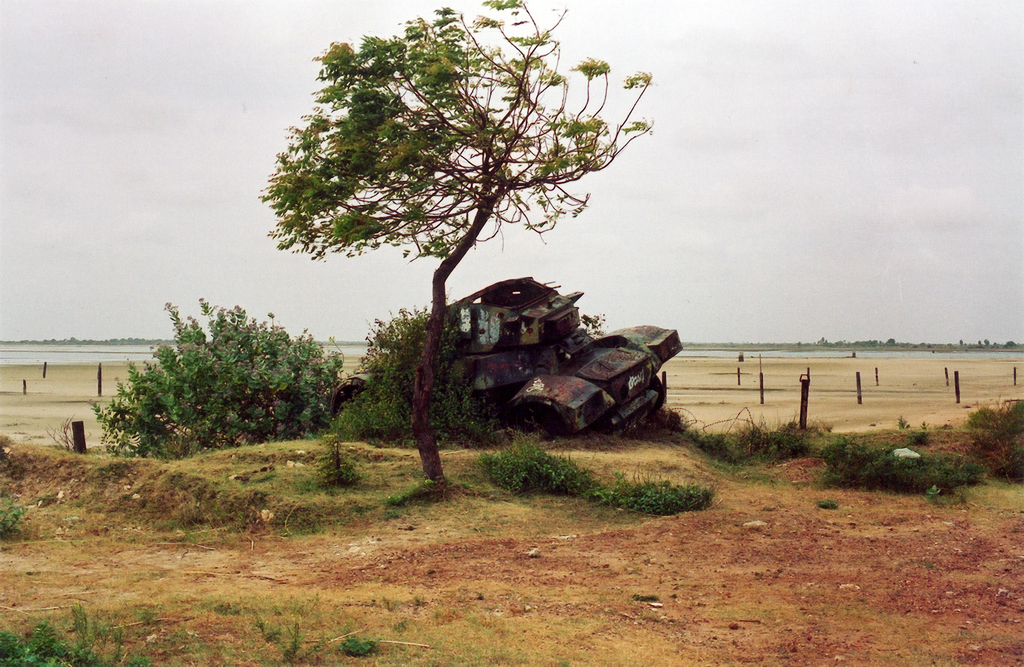
A knocked out Daimler armoured car of the Sri Lankan Army at Elephant Pass

The Ceylon Army received twelve Daimlers in 1959 with the establishment of its 1st Reconnaissance Regiment. The Daimlers served with the Sri Lanka Armoured Corps till the late 1990s having served with the 1st Reconnaissance Regiment in the 1971 JVP insurrection and early part of the Sri Lankan civil war most notably during the First Battle of Elephant Pass in which at least one Daimler was knocked out.

=== Conflicts ===
- Second World War
- Korean War
- Vietnam War
- 1948 Arab–Israeli War
- Indo-Pakistani War
- 1971 JVP Insurrection
- Sri Lankan civil war
- Portuguese Colonial War

== Variants ==
- Mark I
- Mark I CS – close support version with 76 mm gun.
- Mark II – improved turret, modified gun mount, improved radiator, driver escape hatch incorporated into roof, WP grenade container fitted in turret and smoke generator container modified.
- A turretless regimental command version, known as SOD ("Sawn-Off Daimler").

== Operators ==
=== Current ===
- Qatar

=== Former ===
- Australia
- Belgium
- Canada
- India
- Israel
- Malaysia
- Myanmar
- New Zealand
- Pakistan
- Poland
- Sri Lanka
- United Kingdom
- Kuwait
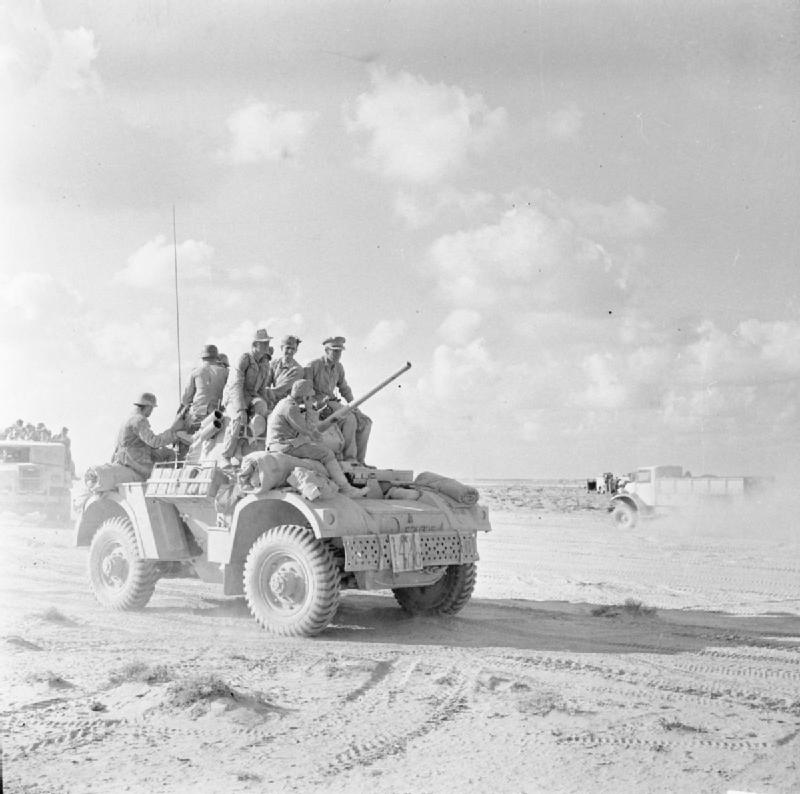

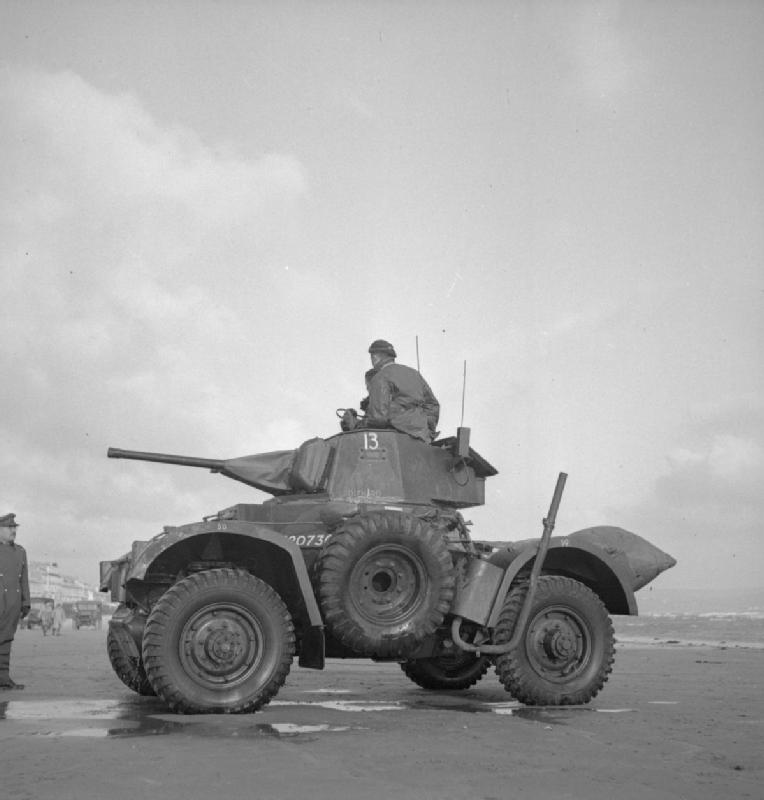

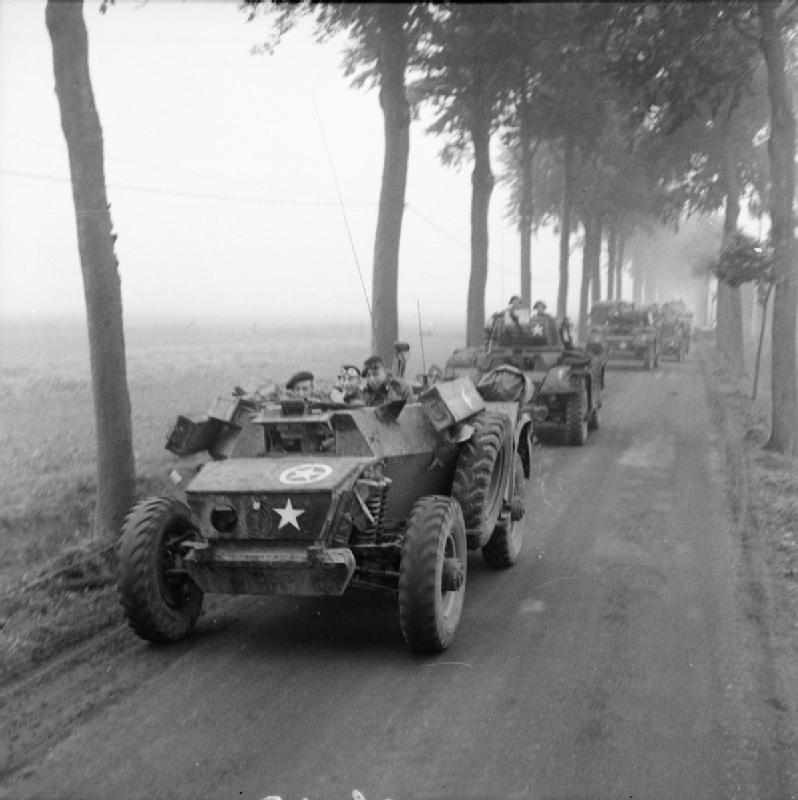

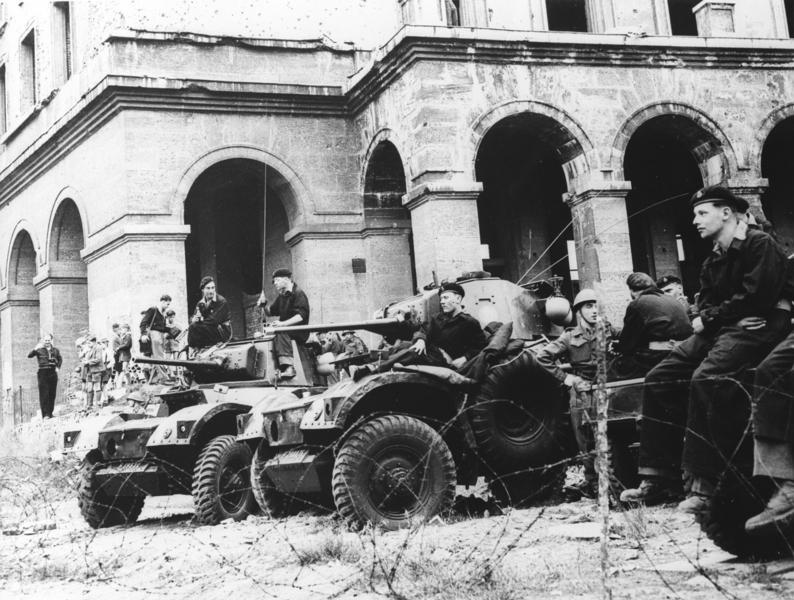

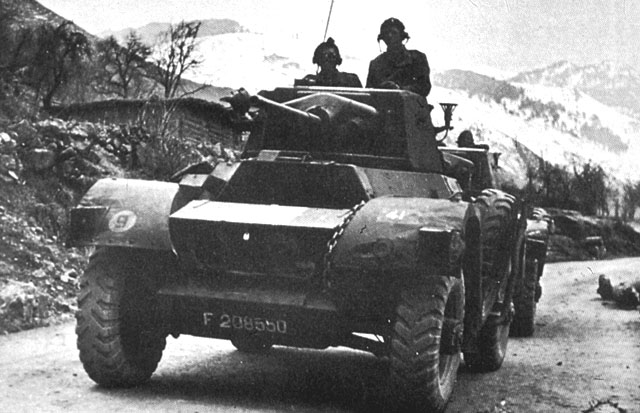
