= Humber armoured car =

British armoured car

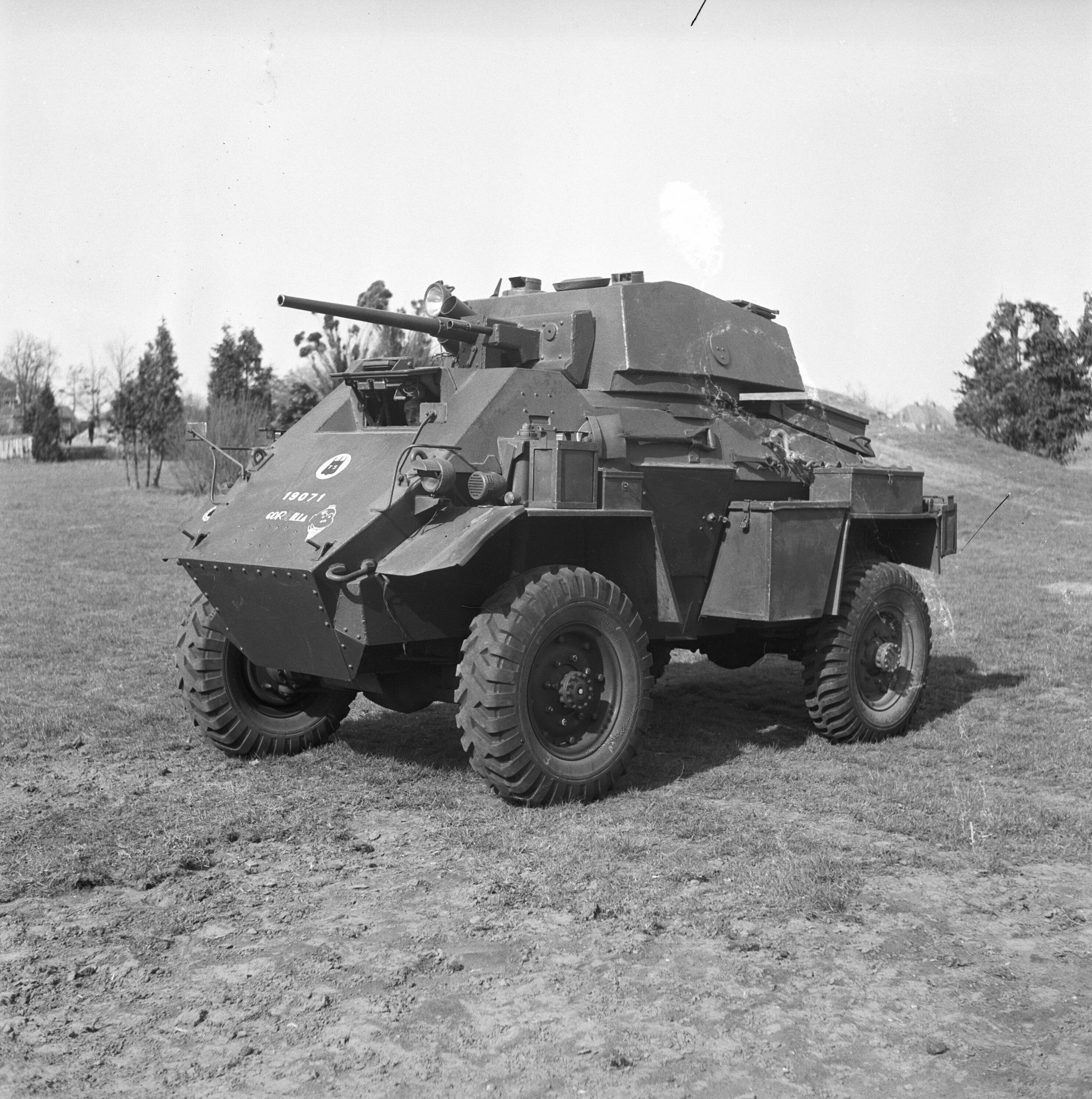
- The Mk IV armed with a 37 mm gun was the most produced variant of the Humber armoured car.
- Place of origin: United Kingdom

Service history
- Used by: See former operators
- Wars: Second World War; 1948 Arab-Israeli War; Operation Polo; Portuguese-Indian War; Portuguese Colonial War; Sino-Indian War

Production history
- Manufacturer: Rootes Group (Karrier)
- Produced: 1940–1945
- No. built: 5,400

Specifications
- Mass: 6.3 tonnes (6.2 long tons; 6.9 short tons)
- Length: 15 ft 1.5 in (4.610 m)
- Width: 7 ft 3 in (2.21 m)
- Height: 7 ft 10 in (2.39 m)
- Crew: Mk I, II, IV: 3 Mk III: 4
- Armour: 21 mm (0.83 in)
- Main armament: Mk I-III: 15 mm Besa machine gun Mk IV: M5 or M6 37 mm gun
- Secondary armament: 7.92 mm Besa machine gun
- Engine: Rootes 6 cylinder petrol engine 90 hp (67 kW)
- Power/weight: 12.9 hp/tonne
- Suspension: Wheel 4x4, rigid front and rear axles, rear-wheel drive with selectable four-wheel drive
- Operational range: 200 miles (320 km)
- Maximum speed: 50 mph (80 km/h)

The Humber armoured car was one of the most widely produced British armoured cars of the Second World War. It supplemented the Humber Light Reconnaissance Car and remained in service until the end of the war.

== Development ==
The Guy company did not have sufficient production capacity to produce sufficient Guy armoured cars as well as other vehicles, so shortly after war broke out the Rootes Group were approached to produce an armoured car – at the time the terminology "Tank, Light (Wheeled)" was used by the Army. Working from the Guy design, Karrier designed a vehicle using as a basis their KT 4 artillery tractor chassis (already in production for the Indian Army) and the armoured body of the Guy armoured car. Karrier moved the KT4 engine to the rear and fitted welded bodies and turrets provided by Guy. As it had been based on proven elements, trials of prototypes passed without serious issues and an order for 500 was placed in 1940 and the first deliveries made in 1941.

The Karrier name was dropped to avoid confusion with the British Universal Carrier tracked vehicle and the vehicles were designated "Armoured Car, Humber Mk 1" using the name of Humber Limited (another member of the Rootes Group) though production was by Karrier at the Luton works of Commer (another Rootes company).

The first Humbers were more or less identical to the Guy down to the faults in the armour, but this was later rectified.

The Mark III improved upon the Mark II by providing a three-man turret. Mark III production ended in 1942 after 1,650 had been built.

The Humber was a relatively complicated build compared to the Daimler Armoured Car but the Rootes Group had larger production capacity so both companies worked on a common design for production. While design of this possible replacement, the 2-pounder (40mm) armed Coventry armoured car, was underway, the Mark IV was designed. This put the US 37 mm gun in the turret but at the cost of one crewman. The Coventry was not ordered as a replacement and so production of Mark IV continued, for a total of 2,000.

== Design ==
The Humber was a rectangular chassis frame with a rear mounted engine. The gearbox was mounted to the front of the engine; it fed a centrally mounted transfer box which distributed power to front and rear differentials. The rigid axles were mounted on leaf springs front and rear with hydraulic dampers. The welded armoured hull was mounted at four points – front, rear and sides – to give some flexibility but with precautions against excessive movement of the hull on the chassis.

For forward vision the driver had a flap in the front of the "cab" (which became part of the glacis from the Mark II onwards). When shut the view he was protected by a Triplex bullet proof glass block. These could be readily replaced if damaged. There were other flaps to the sides. In order to see to the rear there was a combination of a flap in the rear bulkhead between the fighting compartment and engine bay and a mechanism that raised the engine cover.

The turret, armed with one 15mm and one 7.92mm Besa machine guns, was hand traversed. The vehicle commander acted as the wireless operator.

== Service history ==
The vehicle was used in the North African Campaign from late 1941 by the 11th Hussars and other units. Mark IIIs followed in October 1942.

By the invasion of Sicily, an armoured car regiment - the reconnaissance element of an armoured division - had 12 Humber Armoured Cars and four Humber AA in the Regimental HQ. (The majority of the armoured cars in the regiment were Daimler and Staghounds). Reconnaissance Regiments which worked with infantry divisions had, in 1944, one section of two Humber Mk IVs in each of the three scout troops in each reconnaissance squadron; there were three of these squadrons in each battalion of the regiment.

As the German campaign went on, the Afrika Korps made a wide use of whatever equipment they could capture from the British, including the Humber: these vehicles received German markings for identification. It was also widely used in the European theatre by reconnaissance regiments of British and Canadian infantry divisions. A few vehicles were used for patrol duty along the Iran supply route. A British Indian Army armoured car regiment, partly equipped with Humbers, served in the reconquest of Burma. Portugal received a number of Humber vehicles in 1943, most of them going to the Army, but with 20 going to the National Republican Guard. After the Second World War, the Humber was employed by Egypt in 1948–49 as well as by Burma, Ceylon, Cyprus, Denmark, India, Mexico and the Netherlands.

The Humber armoured car was used in Burma Campaign by the 16th Light Cavalry, an Indian armoured car regiment, which formed part of Fourteenth Army troops.

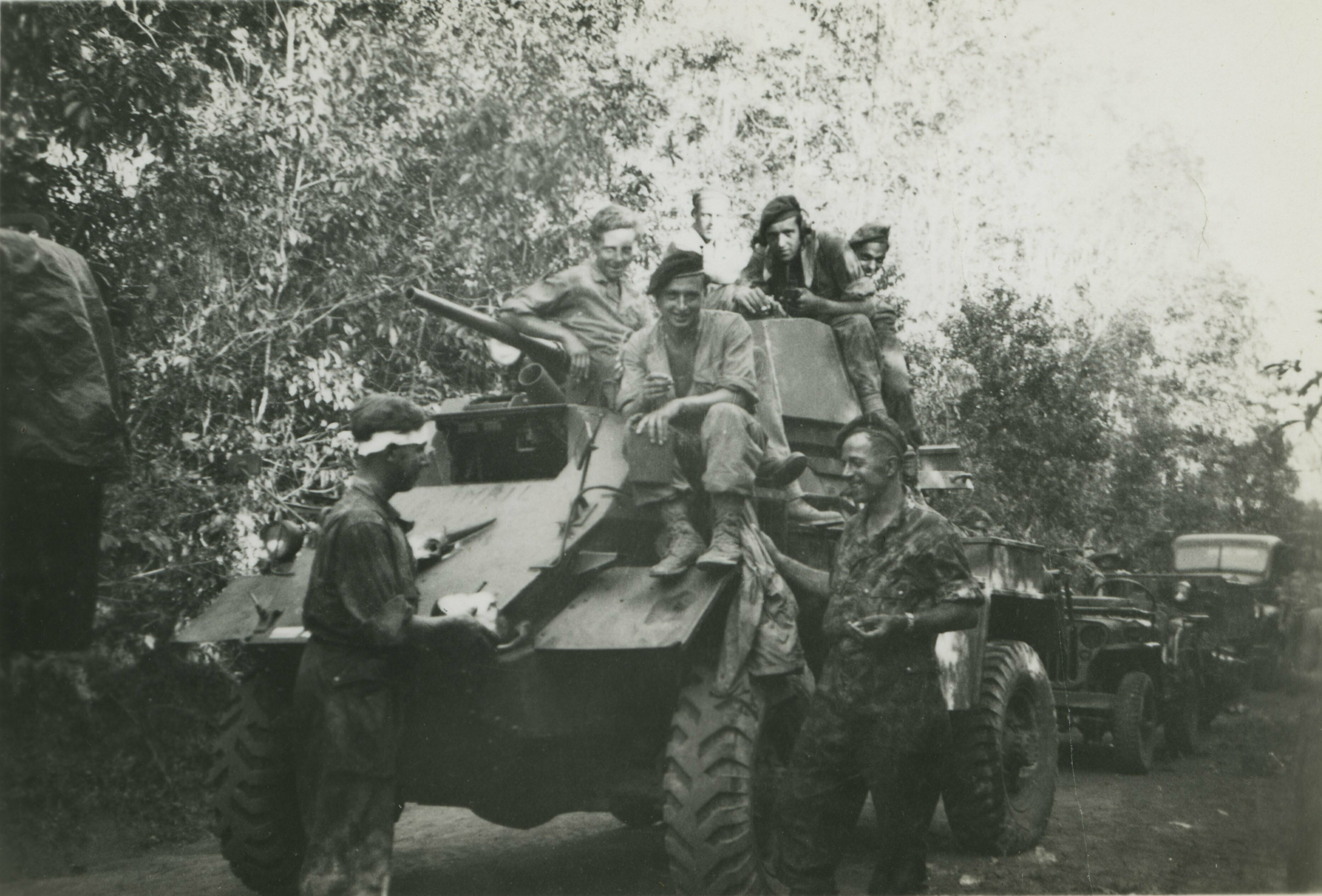
Dutch Humber Mk IV providing security in the Dutch East Indies, 1946

After Independence, an Indian Army regiment, 63rd Cavalry, was raised with Humber Mk IV armoured cars as one of its squadrons which was later hived off as an independent reconnaissance squadron and the integral squadron re-raised, the second time with Daimlers. During the partition of India, some were given to Pakistan Army because of the division of assets and were grouped with Stuart Tanks in the Light Armoured Regiments of the Pakistan Armoured Corps. The Humbers and Daimlers of the Indian Army formed the mounts of the President's Bodyguard and were deployed in the defence of Chushul at heights above 14,000 ft during the 1962 Indo-China War. The Humber was used against the Indian Army in 1948 by the 2nd and 4th Hyderabad Lancers, armoured car cavalry units of the Hyderabad State Forces, during Operation Polo.

Humber armoured cars were employed during the Indian invasion of Goa in December 1961. These vehicles equipped the four reconnaissance squadrons of the Portuguese garrison in Goa. The Portuguese Humbers engaged the invading Indian forces in the brief fights that occurred in the border villages of Doromagogo, Malinguém and Polem, and in the break through the Indian troops surrounding the Portuguese forces in Mapusa.

== Survivors ==
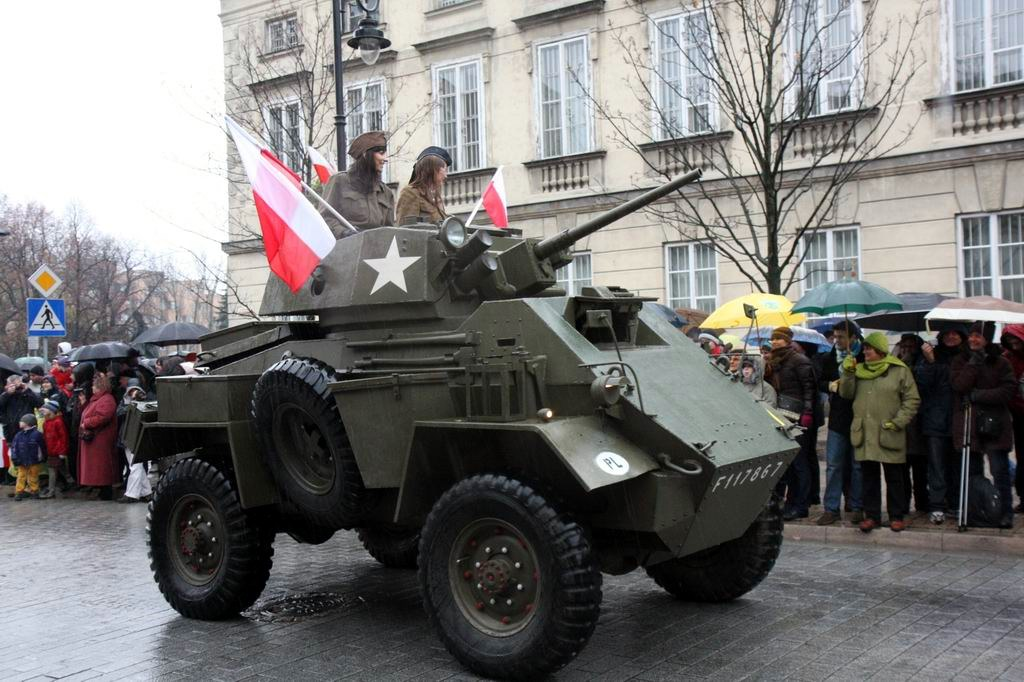
Humber armoured car during National Independence Day (Poland) 2009

Several static and operational cars are distributed through North America and Europe. The Tank Museum, Bovington, England has an original and sole survivor Guy Wheeled Tank on display and a Humber Mk II not currently on display. A Mk IV is on display at the Australian Armour and Artillery Museum in Cairns, Australia. Two Portuguese cars are on display, one at the Museu do Combatente in Lisbon and the other at the Military Museum of Elvas.

A fully restored original Humber Mk IV is in the USA. It is being used for living history displays and reenactments. It saw service in the British and Portuguese militaries. Seeing service in the Carnation Revolution.

== Variants ==
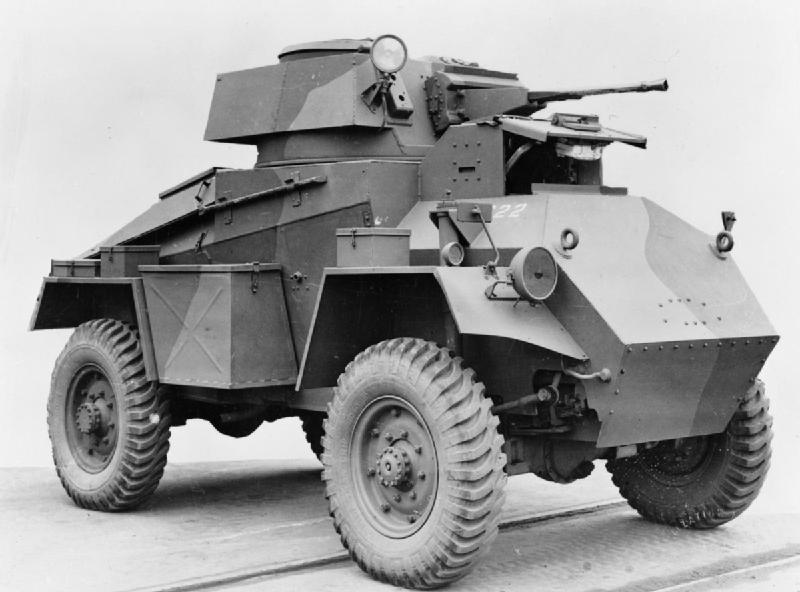
Mk I showing its similarity to the Guy Mk IA armoured car

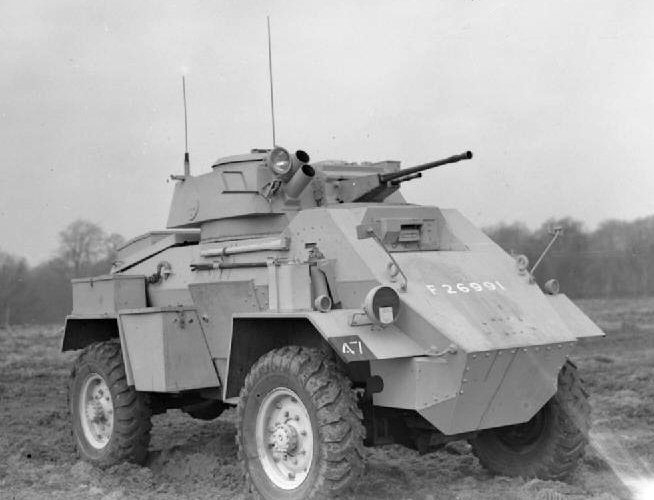
Mk II with redesigned glacis armour

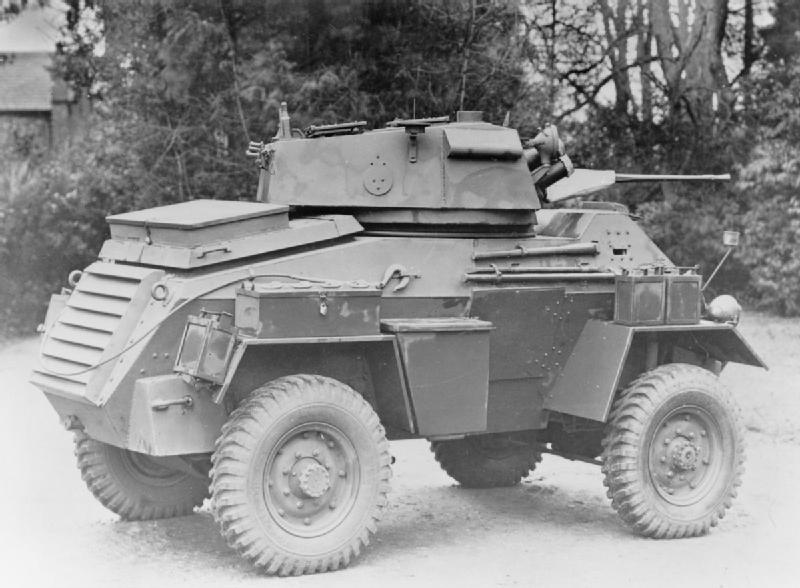
Mk III with visible turret overhang

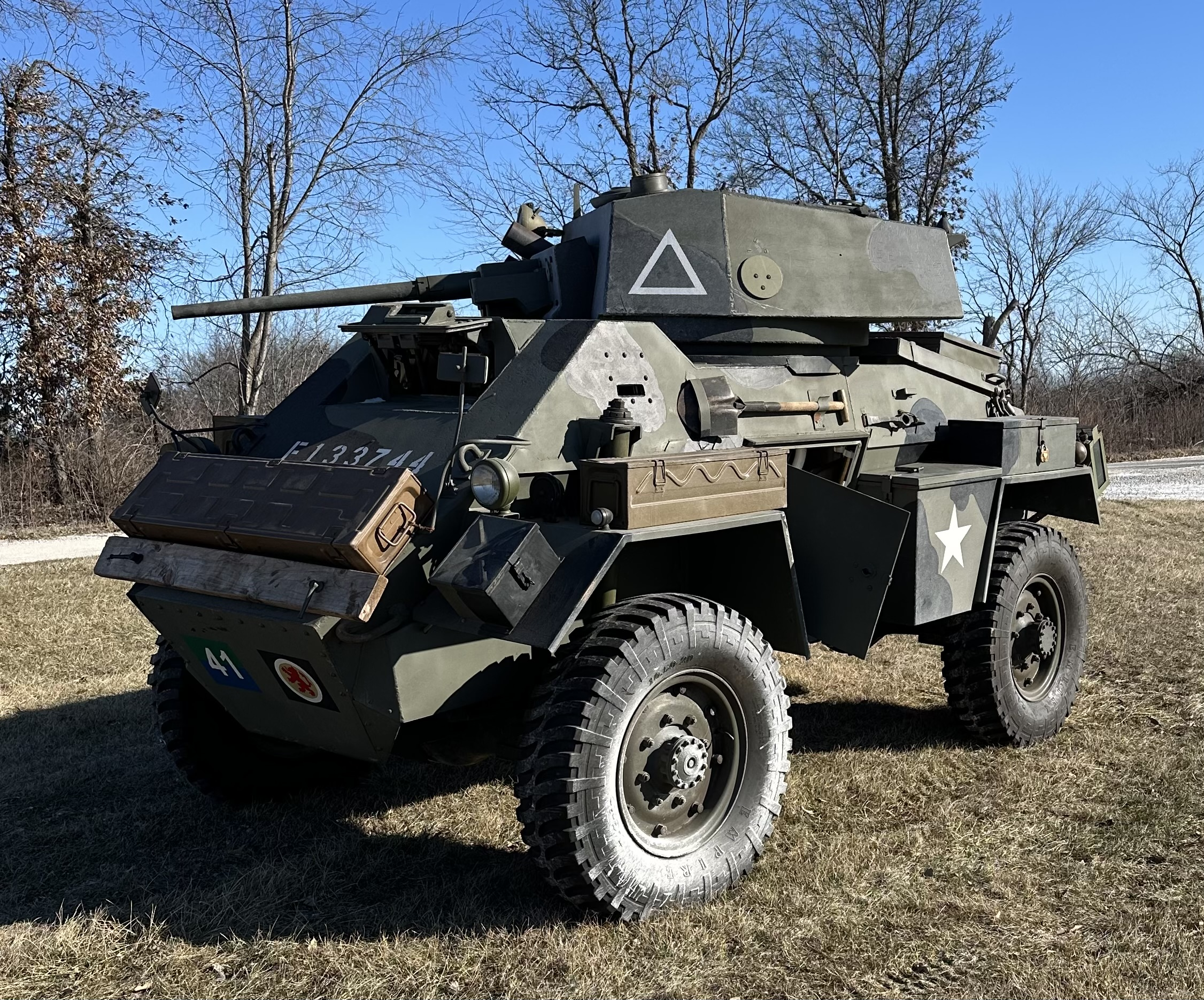
Humber Mk IV

Mark I
Original version, hull as the Guy armoured car Mark 1A. Armed with one 15 mm and one 7.92 mm calibre Besa machine guns. Three-man crew: driver, gunner, commander. About 300 units built.e (Note: White gives 500 Mark I produced.)
Mark II
Changes to the turret, hull revised with driver's cab incorporated into the glacis plate, armour grille added to radiator. 440 units built.
Mark II OP
Observation post vehicle fitted for communication with field artillery batteries, armed with two 7.92 mm Besa machine guns
Mark III
Larger three-man turret - increased headroom - with provisions for a wireless operator freeing up the wireless operation tasks of the commander.
Mark III "Rear Link"

Main gun replaced with dummy to allow installation of a Wireless Set No. 19 High Power, ie amplified, and its generator. Turret locked in place. Issued two per regiment for communication between Brigade and Divisional headquarters.

Mark IV
Equipped with the US M5 or M6 37 mm high velocity gun in place of the 15 mm Besa. The larger gun required the removal of the third crewman in the turret (the wireless operator). Turret hatches were rearranged with the new gun and crew layout. About 2,000 units built. As with the Mark II, an OP version "Armoured Car, Humber Mk IV O.P." was produced.
AA Mark I
The Mark I fitted with a different turret (by Stothert & Pitt) mounting four 7.92 mm Besa machine guns able to elevate to near vertical and an AA sight. Introduced in 1943, the vehicle was intended to provide anti-aircraft support for armoured car units (at a rate of one troop of four cars per regiment), but the Allied air superiority meant they were needed less and less as the war progressed and the troops were disbanded in 1944. A twin 15mm Besa version was also made.

== Former operators ==
=== Second World War ===
- British Empire
- British India
- Canada
- Nazi Germany − Captured, used by the Afrika Korps
- Italy − Captured during the North African campaign
- Portugal

=== Post-War ===
- Burma
- Ceylon
- Cyprus
- Denmark
- Egypt
- Hyderabad
- India
- Indonesia
- Iraq
- Mexico
- Netherlands
- Pakistan − Retired in 1972

== See also ==
- Fox armoured car – a Canadian vehicle based on the Humber Mk III

== Sources ==
- Chamberlain, Peter; Ellis, Chris (1971). Afrika Korps: German military operations in the Western Desert, 1941−42. Edgware: Almark Publishing Co. Ltd. ISBN 978-0-85524-018-9.
- Forty, George (1996). World War Two Armoured Fighting Vehicles and Self-Propelled Artillery. Osprey Publishing. ISBN 1-85532-582-9.
- Moschanskiy, I. (1999). "Бронетанковая техника Великобритании 1939–1945 часть 2" [Armoured Vehicles of Great Britain 1939–1945, Part 2]. Bronekollektsiya (in Russian). No. 2. Modelist-Konstruktor. Archived from the original on 11 December 2008.
- "Humber Mark IV/Fox Mark II Armoured Car". Warwheels.net.
- Fletcher, David (1989a). The Great Tank Scandal: British Armour in the Second World War - Part 1. HMSO. ISBN 978-0-11-290460-1.
- White, B.T. (1970). Armoured Cars: Guy, Daimler, Humber, AEC. AFV/Weapons Profile. Vol. 21. Profile Publications.
- Armoured Car Humber Mark IV. Publication No. 1305. War Office. 1944.
- Orde, Roden (1953). The Household Cavalry At War. The Story Of The Second Household Cavalry Regiment. Gale & Polden. ISBN 1399073354.
