= Ordnance QF 75 mm =

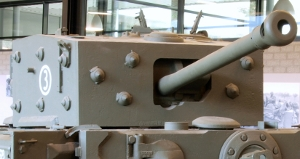
- Gun on Cromwell tank at Overloon War Museum, Netherlands
- Type: Tank gun
- Place of origin: United Kingdom

Service history
- Used by: British Empire
- Wars: Second World War

Production history
- Manufacturer: Royal Ordnance

Specifications
- Mass: 692 lb (314 kg)
- Length: 117.4 in (2.98 m)
- Barrel length: 118.1 in (3.00 m)
- Shell: 75×350R
- Calibre: 75 mm (2.953 in)
- Muzzle velocity: 2,030 ft/s (620 m/s)

The Ordnance QF 75 mm (OQF 75 mm) was a British tank gun of the Second World War. It was obtained by fitting a new barrel and a modified breech to the mounting of the Ordnance QF 6-pounder ("6 pdr") 57 mm anti-tank gun, to give better performance against infantry targets similarly to the 75 mm M3 gun fitted to the American Sherman tank. The QF came from "quick-firing", referring to the use of ammunition where the shell has a fixed cartridge. The gun was also sometimes known as ROQF from Royal Ordnance (the manufacturer) Quick-Firing.

== Development ==
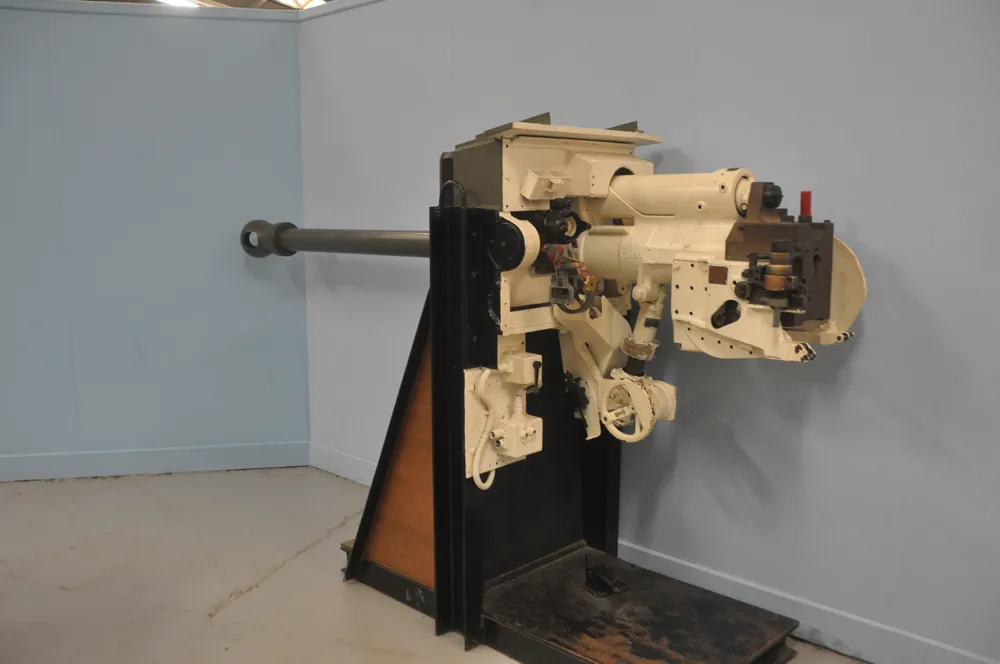
Ordnance QF 75mm

Prior to the introduction of the ROQF 75 mm, British tanks had been equipped with first the QF 2-pounder (40 mm) and then the larger 6-pounder (57 mm). These guns were designed to fire armour-piercing shot, small high-velocity solid rounds that were effective against tanks but did little damage to groups of infantry or soft targets like trucks. Some tanks operating as infantry support were given howitzers firing HE shells, such as early models of the Churchill and CS (Close Support) versions of the Matilda II. The decision to equip British tanks with a gun capable of firing HE shells at soft targets was taken by the War Office.

A HE shell for the 6-pounder was in production by the start of the Tunisia Campaign and available in large numbers in the Italian Campaign. The round lacked sufficient explosive power, but the power of the US 75 mm HE round used in the 75 mm M3 was found to be markedly superior and a number of Churchills used in Italy had guns scavenged from Sherman tanks and fitted to their turrets to give the Churchill NA75 (NA coming from "North Africa" where the conversions were carried out). Approximately 200 were converted in this way.

Vickers was working on a high velocity 75 mm gun to be fitted to British tanks. This took the cartridge case of the 3 inch 20 cwt anti-aircraft gun mated to the US 75 mm AP and HE shell. With a barrel length of 50 calibres, it would have had about twice the muzzle energy of the US 75 mm gun. The design turned out to be too big to fit into the tank that it had been expected to fit.

It was noticed that the US 75 mm cartridge was almost the same diameter as the British 6-pounder case. Instead of having to take the American gun to be fitted en masse into modified British tanks, the Royal Ordnance factory modified the 6-pounder design by fitting a new barrel and adapting the breech to fire the US round. By preserving the barrel and breach mounting points the resulting gun could then be fitted without redesigned tank mountings and dramatically simplified supply since both British-made and American-made 75 mm guns could use the same ammunition. It gained British tanks a good HE shell but came with an inferior anti-tank round, proving troublesome against heavily armoured German tanks.

Though the 75 mm had a good HE shell, it was still thought that a more powerful close support weapon was needed and the QF 95 mm howitzer was agreed for a limited number of tanks.

== Ammunition ==
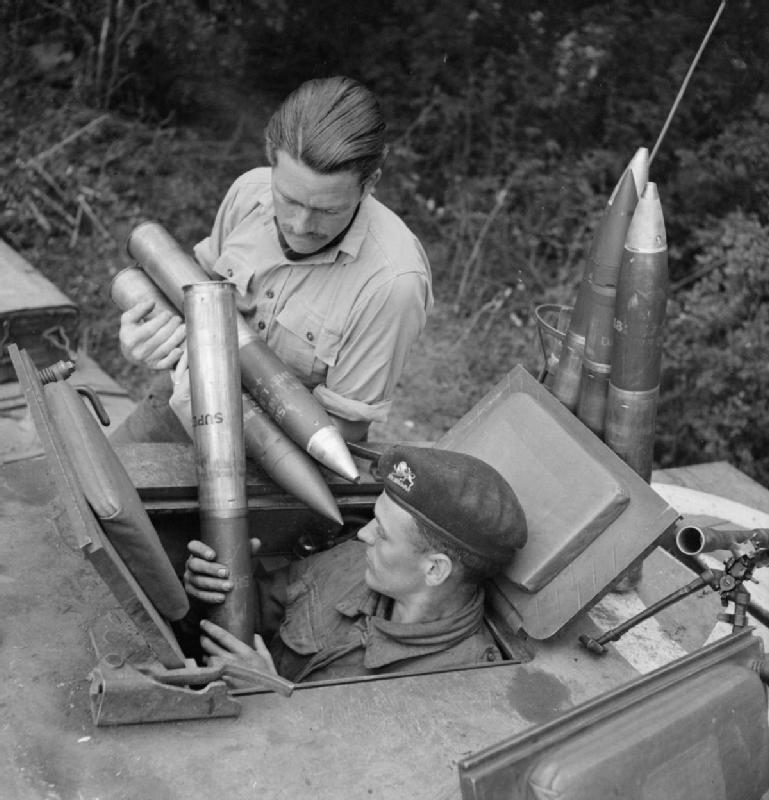
Loading ammunition into a Churchill tank, Normandy July 1944

The QF 75 mm used US ammunition. The shells were "fixed" ammunition, the shell cartridge and projectile being joined together as a complete round.

- Shell HE M48 (Note: full name for the round was "Shell, fixed, HE M48, normal charge" followed by the fuze specification) with either M48A2, M54, M51A4, or M21A4 fuze.

Bursting charge was 1.49 lb (0.68 kg) TNT or 1.36 lb (0.62 kg) 50/50 Amatol or 1.52 lb (0.69 kg) trimonite. (Note: 80% ammonium nitrate, 10% TNT, 10% aluminium) The M48 fuze could be set for impact detonation ("Superquick") or delayed detonation; when in "Superquick" setting the delay would set the shell off if the impact did not set off the fuze. The M54 round had variable delay; the fuze starting to burn at the instant of firing the round.

- Shot APC M61, with tracer in the base

An armour-piercing capped projectile with a thin ballistic cap ("windshield") for better aerodynamics, used with or without bursting charge and fuze M66A1.

- Shot AP M72, with tracer in the base

An entirely solid armour-piercing projectile.

== Service ==
The ROQF 75 mm was chiefly used on the Churchill and Cromwell tanks. The weapon was used in Italy and in the Normandy invasion (and possibly in Burma against the Japanese) until the end of the war. While the 75 mm was a conversion from the 6-pounder, some units retained a number of 6-pounder-gunned tanks, due to its superior anti-tank firepower over the 75 mm, especially as the 6-pounder could use more effective APCR and APDS rounds.

Externally, the gun was nearly identical to the 6-pounder gun. The 14.9 lb (6.76 kg) HE shell fired at 2,050 ft/s (625 m/s) was found to be the best available and superior to that of the 6-pounder, M7 3 in and 17-pounder, all chiefly anti-tank guns. Against armour, its AP shell was the worst, penetrating only 68 mm of RHA at 500 yards (460 m) and a 30-degree angle of attack, whereas the AP shells of the others penetrated between 57 mm and 76 mm in Normandy during 1944. The AP shell for the 75 mm gun was a 15 lb (6.8 kg) projectile with a couple of ounces (60 g) of HE filling propelled by a 2 lb (900 g) charge to 2,000 feet per second (610 m/s). In British service, the AP shell was used without its explosive filling and as such was referred to as "AP Shot M61".

British tank guns of the Second World War
Gun	Caliber	Shell weight	Muzzle velocity	Muzzle energy kJ
2 pdr	40×304mm L/50	(AP/T shot) 2.7 lb (1.2 kg)	2,650 ft/s (810 m/s)	295
6 pdr	57×441mm L50	(AP shot) 6.3 lb (2.9 kg)	3,000 ft/s (910 m/s)	1,100
75 mm	75×350mm L/40	14.9 lb (6.8 kg)	2,050 ft/s (620 m/s)	1,300
17 pdr	76.2×583mm L/55	17 lb (7.7 kg)	2,950 ft/s (900 m/s)	3,100

== See also ==
=== Weapons of comparable role, performance and era ===
- 7.5 cm KwK 40 – Contemporary German tank gun
- 76.2 mm F-34 – Contemporary Soviet tank gun
- M3 75 mm /40 – Contemporary US tank gun
