= Ordnance QF 2-pounder =

Tank gun and anti-tank gun

Ordnance QF 2 pounder
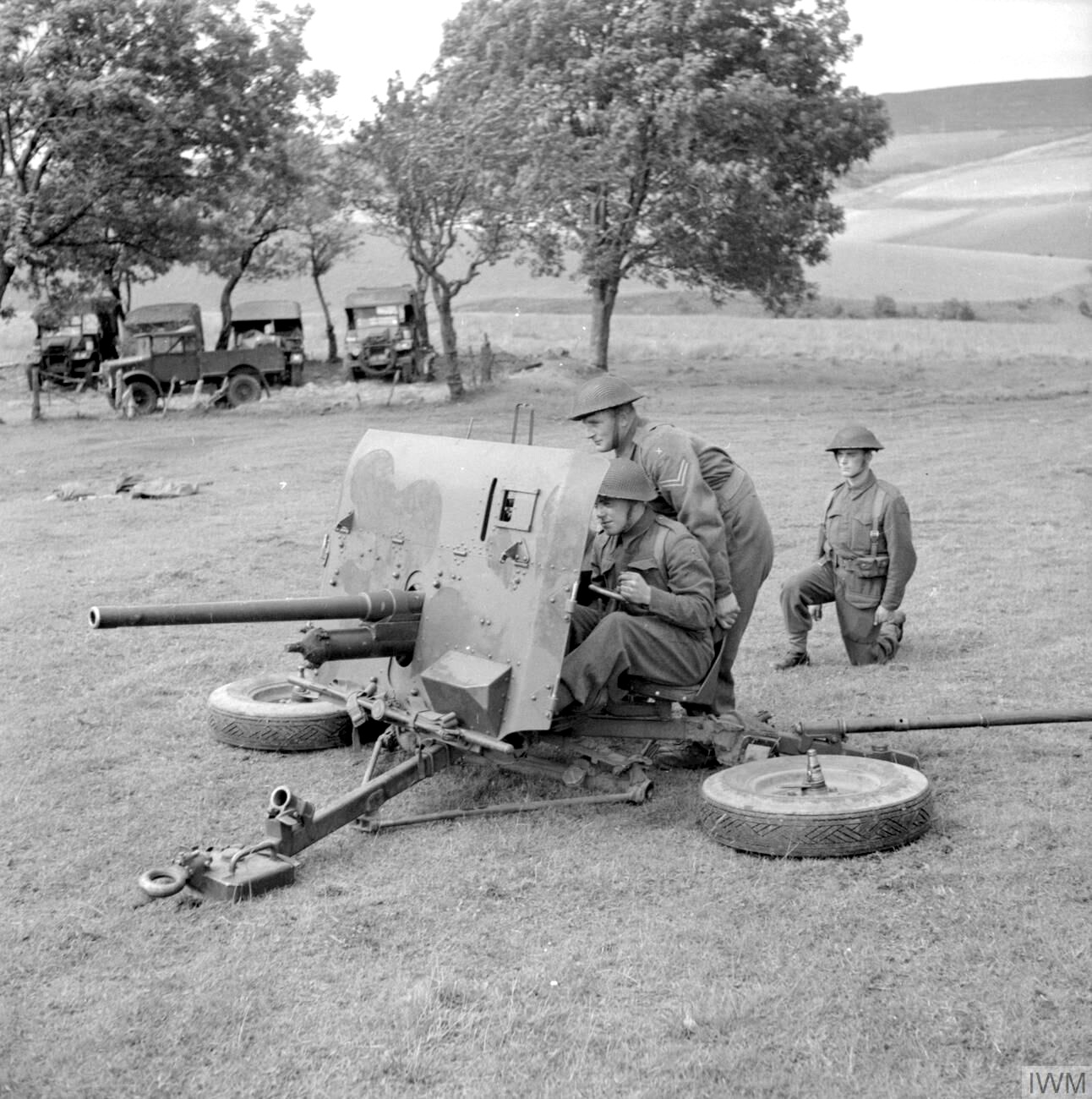
- QF 2 pounder set up for firing; the gun commander stands behind the gun and the third crewmember would fetch ammunition.
- Type: Tank gun Anti-tank gun
- Place of origin: United Kingdom

Service history
- In service: 1936–1945
- Used by: United Kingdom; Canada; Australia; Ireland; Nazi Germany (captured); Egypt; Malaysia
- Wars: Spanish Civil War; World War II; 1948 Arab–Israeli War

Production history
- Designed: 1936
- Manufacturer: Vickers-Armstrongs
- Produced: 1936–1944
- No. built: 12,000

Specifications (on Carriage Mk II)
- Mass: 800 kilograms (1,760 lb) (field gun total); 130 kilograms (290 lb) (gun with breech)
- Barrel length: overall: 6 ft 10 in (2.08 m) L/52 (Note: rifling was 5 ft 6 in (1.68 m))
- Width: 59.25 in (1.505 m)
- Height: 55.15 in (1.401 m)
- Crew: 3–5
- Shell: 40×304mmR
- Calibre: 40 mm (1.575 in)
- Breech: Semi-automatic vertical sliding-block
- Recoil: Hydro-spring
- Carriage: three-leg platform
- Elevation: -13° to +15°
- Traverse: 360°
- Rate of fire: 22 rounds per minute
- Muzzle velocity: 2,600 ft/s (792 m/s) with AP shot
- Effective firing range: 1,500 yd (1,400 m)
- Maximum firing range: 1,800 yd (1,600 m)
- Feed system: Breech-loaded
- Sights: No.24b

The Ordnance QF 2-pounder (QF denoting "quick firing"), or simply "2 pounder gun", was a 40 mm (1.575 in) British anti-tank gun and vehicle-mounted gun employed in the Second World War.

It was the main anti-tank weapon of the artillery units in the Battle of France and, due to the need to rearm quickly after the Dunkirk evacuation, remained in service during the North African campaign. In its vehicle-mounted variant, the 2-pounder was a common main gun on British tanks early in World War II, as well as being a typical main armament of armoured cars, such as the Daimler, throughout the war. As the armour protection of Axis tanks improved, the 2-pounder lost effectiveness and it was gradually replaced by the 57 mm QF 6-pounder starting in 1942. It equipped infantry battalion anti-tank platoons, replacing their anti-tank rifles until being replaced in turn by 6-pounders, but remained in service until the end of the war.

This QF 2-pounder was distinctly different from the QF 2 pounder "pom-pom" gun, which was a 40 mm autocannon used by the Royal Navy as an anti-aircraft gun.

== History ==
The gun was developed as both a tank weapon and an anti-tank gun. For reasons of economy and standardization, it was accepted – as the 2-pdr Mark IX – for both purposes in October 1935. Carriages for the gun were designed by Vickers and the Design Department at the Woolwich Arsenal.

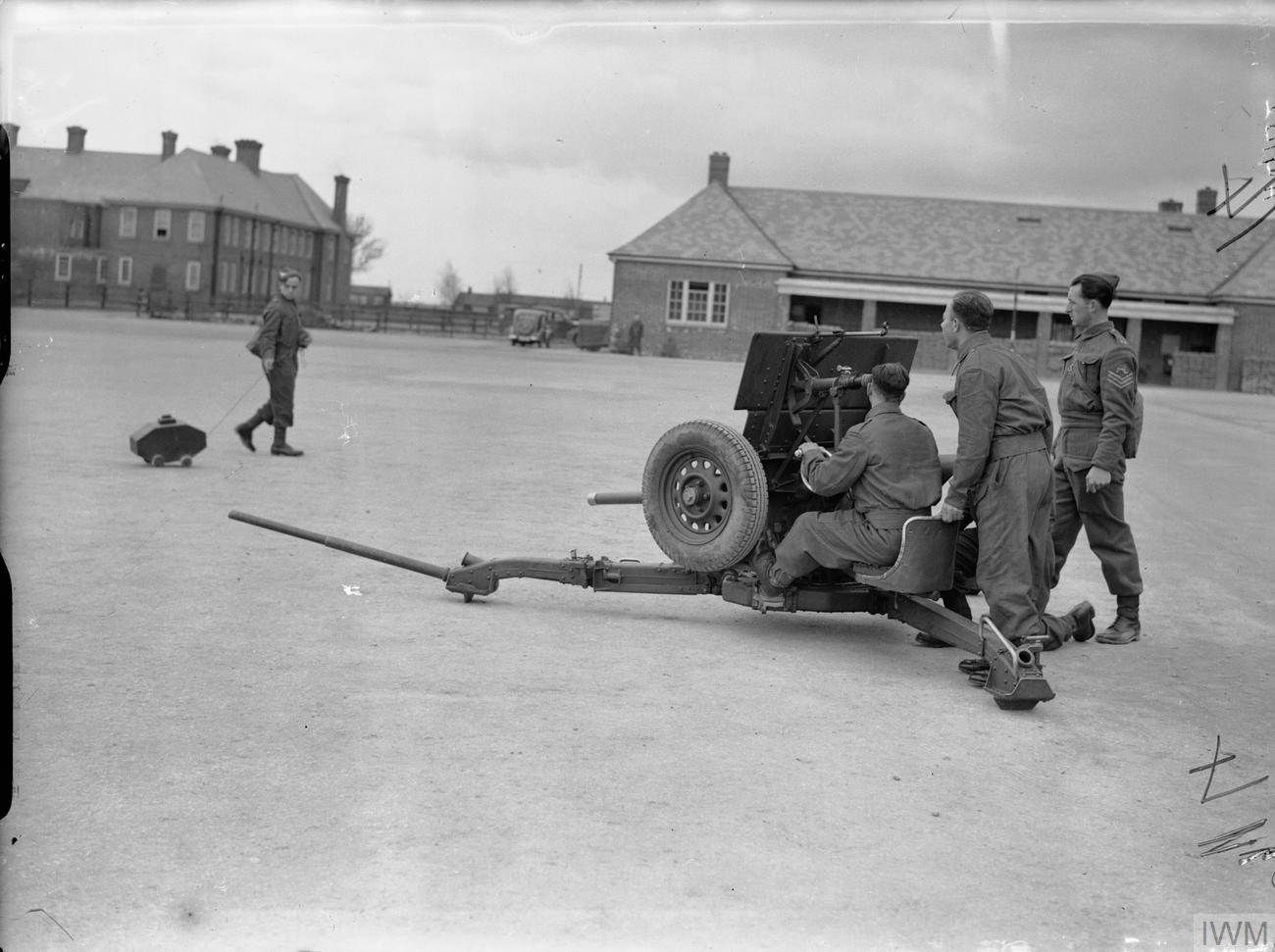
Mark I carriage, April 1941

Vickers was the first to submit a design, which was accepted as the 'Ordnance QF 2-pounder Mark IX on Carriage Mark I'. A limited number of pieces were built in 1936. The carriage had an innovative three-legged construction. In the travelling position, one of the legs was used as a towing trail, and the other two were folded. When the gun was positioned for combat, the legs were emplaced on the ground and the wheels were lifted up. Woolwich Arsenal had continued to develop their carriage and when re-examined was seen to be superior to Vickers design, and with this carriage the gun was adopted as 'Ordnance QF 2-pounder Mark IX on Carriage Mark II'. It was conceptually similar, although the wheels had to be removed when the gun was emplaced for combat. This carriage was also manufactured by Vickers.

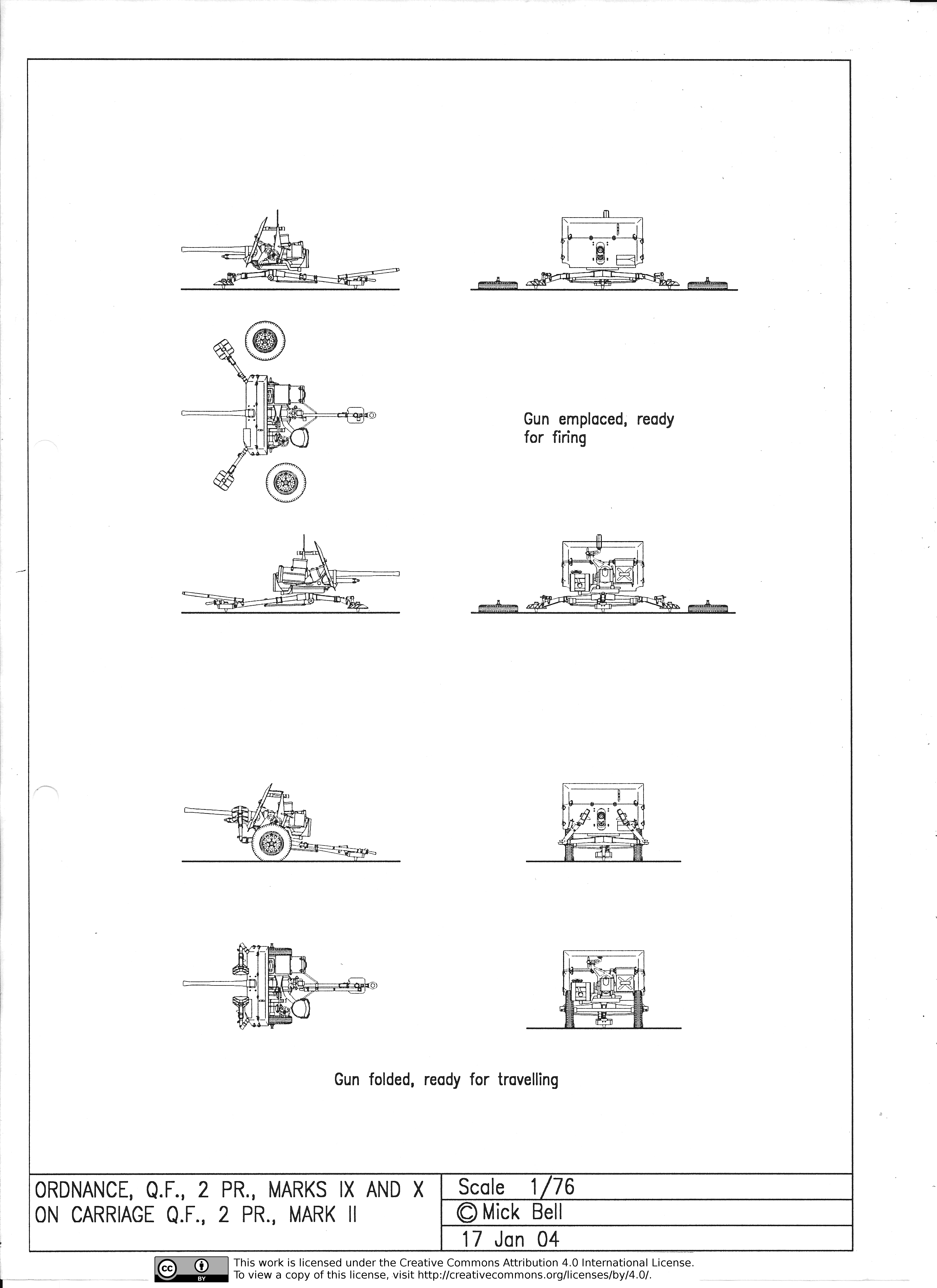
Mark II carriage, firing and travelling views

The unusual construction gave the gun good stability and a traverse of 360 degrees, allowing it to quickly engage moving vehicles from any approach. The gunner had handwheels for traverse and elevation. Additionally, he could disengage the traverse mechanism and the gun commander could rotate the gun by pushing against the gunners shoulders. The commander was aided by a simple ring and bead sight on the top of the shield. The gunner had a 1.9x magnification telescopic sight with a 21 degree field of view, graduated from 600 yd (550 m) to 1,800 yd (1,600 m) at 300 yd intervals. The gunner also had a notch and bead sight above the telescopic

With the Vickers carriage, the gun could also be fired from its wheels, at the expense of limited traverse. The shield was 5/16 inch armour plate. Typically, it was towed by a 15-cwt (3/4-ton) truck (Note: 15 hundredweight was the nominal carrying capacity of the vehicle. The Morris CS8 and Fordson WOT2 were typical of the type.) with 68 rounds on the truck and a further 14 on the carriage itself. It could also be carried "portee" on a 30-cwt truck.

The 40 mm 2-pounder could outperform a typical 37 mm piece, such as the German 3.7 cm PaK 36 or the Bofors 37 mm, and significantly outclassed 25mm and 20mm weapons of that era. A drawback of the 2-pounder was that it was nearly twice as heavy as the PaK 36 and had a higher profile.

The gun was first put into use on armoured fighting vehicles as the main armament of the new lines of cruiser and infantry tanks – the Cruiser Mk I and the Matilda II, which entered production in 1937. The Light Tank Mk VII, which was designed in 1937, also had the gun, as did the Daimler armoured car developed in the following years.

To improve performance, a squeeze bore system was developed. The Littlejohn adaptor, which screwed onto the end of the gun's barrel, was used with Armour-piercing, composite non-rigid (APCNR) ammunition. The round fired a light alloy carrier surrounding a heavy tungsten shot; as it passed through the tapered barrel of the adaptor, the carrier was squeezed from 40 mm to 30 mm diameter. The reduction in cross-sectional area increased the driving force and therefore the velocity of the round taking penetration from 52 mm to 88 mm.

A late-war project was the Canadian David High Velocity to allow 2-pdr ammunition to be fired from the larger-calibre 6-pdr. This was intended to improve the muzzle velocity of the shot. Initial trials carried out in Canada and the U.K. were promising; however, the system was still being developed when the war ended, and the program was subsequently ended along with it.

Another development was the 2-pdr HV 'Pipsqueak', a postwar gun using a 40x438R cartridge originally intended as the main armament for the Alvis Saladin armoured car that was to replace the AEC armoured car. This was designed to fire Armour-Piercing Discarding Sabot (APDS) rounds, which would match the penetration of the 'Littlejohn adaptor' shot while still allowing high-explosive (HE) shells to be fired. The claimed performance was better, the 1,295 m/s (4,250 ft/s) shot penetrating 85 mm (3.3 in) of armour at 60 degrees at 900 m (980 yd). Development of this gun was also abandoned when the role of the Saladin shifted towards infantry fire support, and a low-velocity 76 mm gun was selected for it instead.

Initially, one of the most serious shortcomings of the 2-pdr was the lack of a high-explosive shell resulting from the British doctrine. This was especially serious when the 2-pdr was the main gun of a tank being used for infantry support, intentionally leaving it with only its machine gun for anti-personnel use. The doctrine was slow to change even in the light of battlefield experience, and the high-explosive shell was not produced until late 1942.

== Service history ==
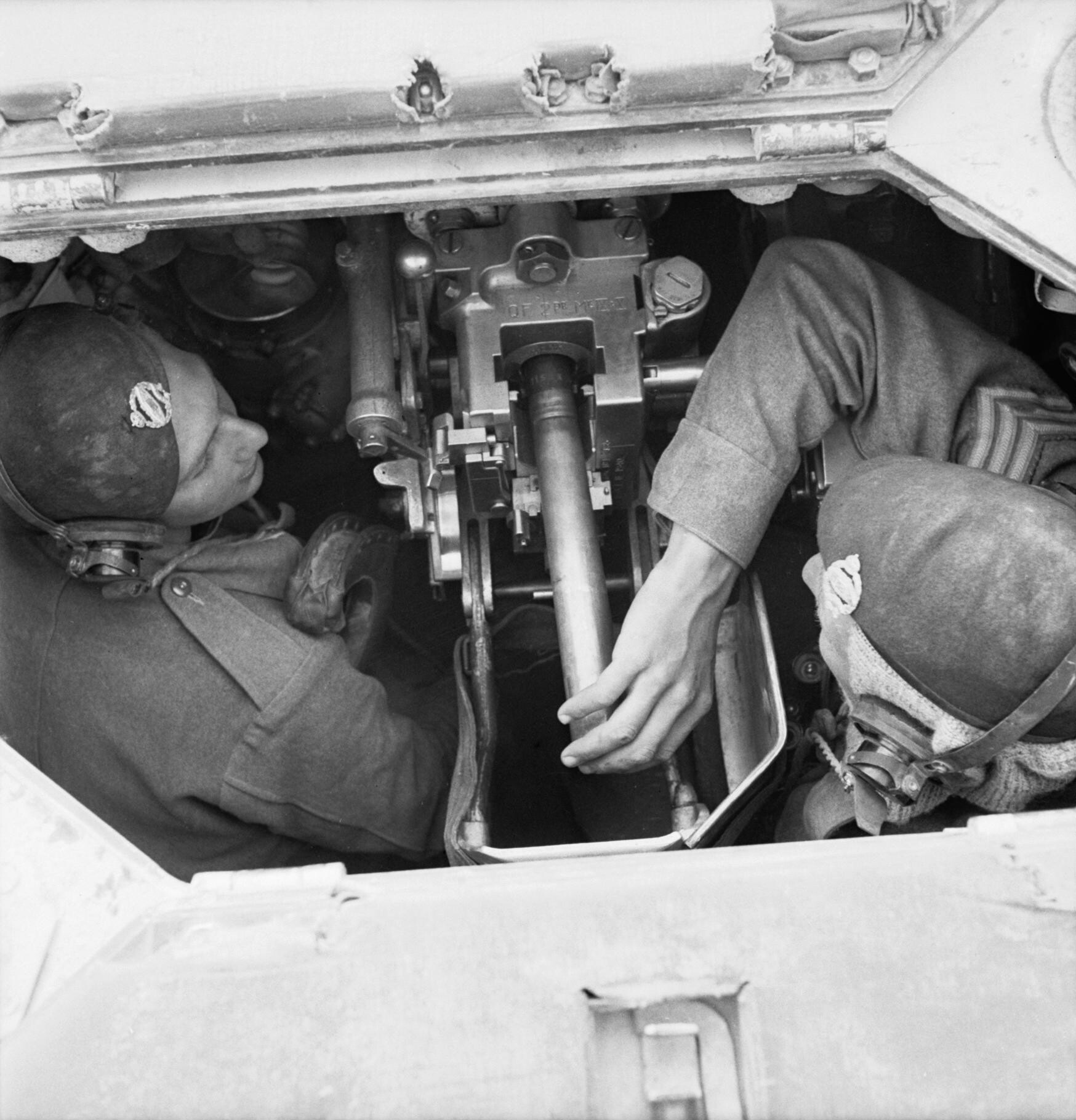
Crew inside a Valentine tank loading the gun

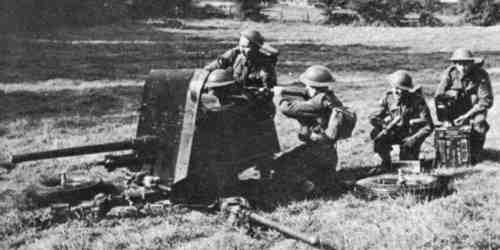
2 pounder in action, legs unfolded, with British troops

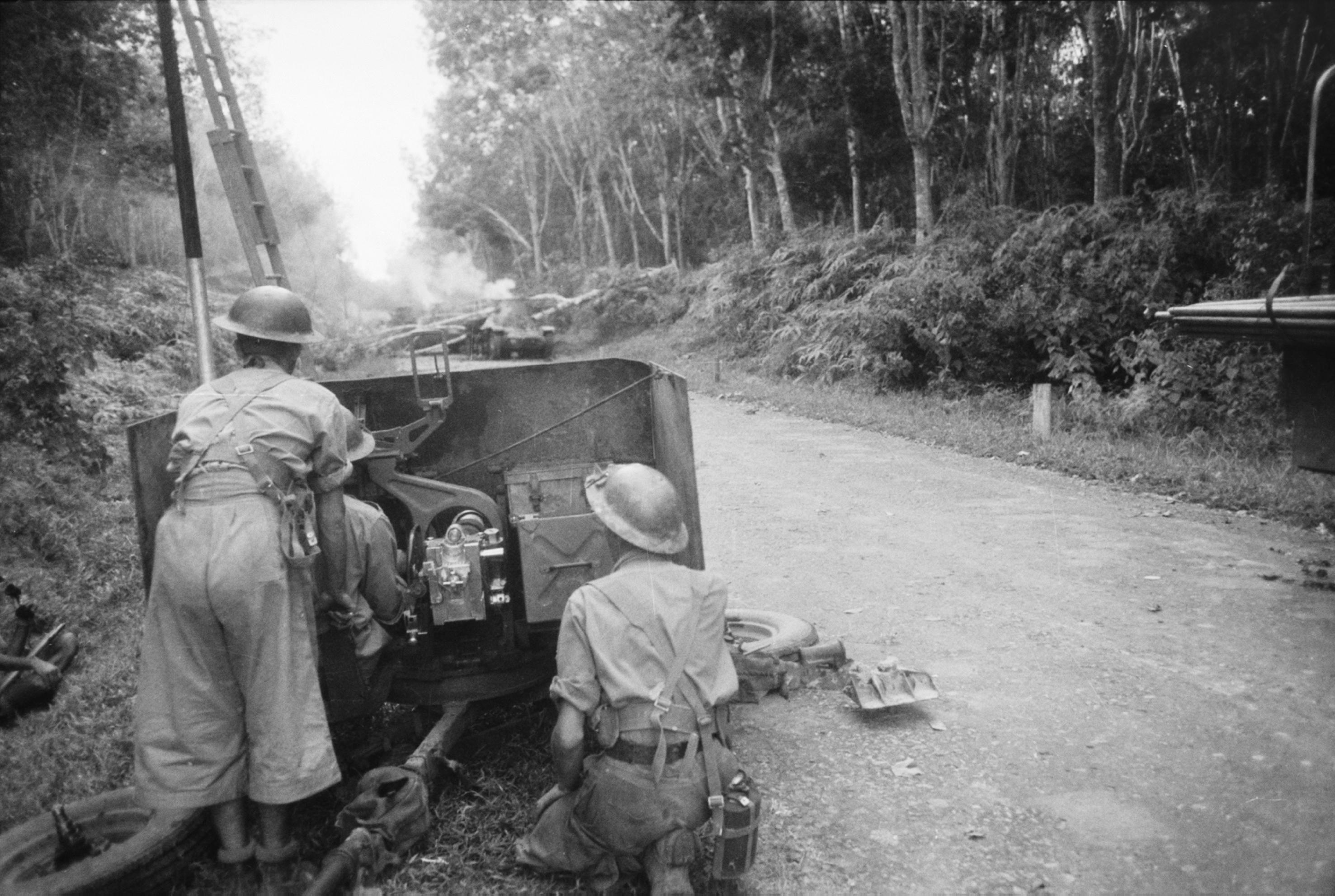
Australian 2 pounder crew firing on Japanese tanks at point-blank range in the Battle of Muar

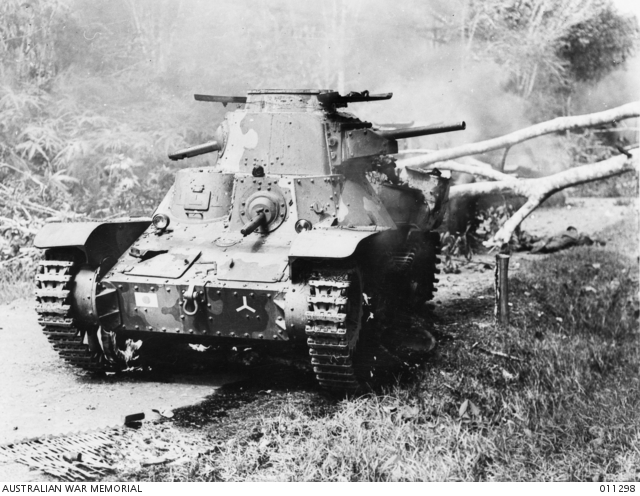
Type 95 Ha-Go tanks, victims of the Australian 2 pounder gun (see above image)

The 2-pdr gun became a part of the Royal Artillery in 1938, when five regular army field brigades were converted to anti-tank regiments. The Territorial Army formed ten anti-tank regiments (numbered 51st to 60th) by converting five field brigades and five infantry battalions. In the early western campaigns, the 2-pdr was employed by two types of Royal Artillery units: anti-tank regiments of infantry divisions (four batteries with 12 pieces each), and light anti-aircraft/anti-tank regiments of armoured divisions (two 12-gun AT batteries). From October 1940, separate 48-gun anti-tank regiments were introduced to armoured divisions too. Infantry brigades initially included an anti-tank company, though it was typically equipped with 25 mm Hotchkiss anti-tank guns; these companies were disbanded later in the war. From 1942, infantry battalions received their own six-gun anti-tank platoons. The organization was different in the Far East theatres. The exact internal structure of AT units was also subject to changes and variations.

The gun first saw combat with the British Expeditionary Force (World War II) during the German invasion of the Low Countries and the subsequent rear-guard actions at Dunkirk. Most of the British Army's 2-pdrs were left behind in France during the retreat, stripping most of the army's infantry anti-tank capability. Those guns captured at Dunkirk entered German service under the designation 4.0 cm Pak 192 (e) or 4.0 cm Pak 154 (b), the "e" and "b" referring to the origin (English or mistakenly attributed to the Belgian Army).

Although Woolwich Arsenal had already designed a successor to the 2-pdr, the 6 pounder gun, it was decided in the face of a possible German invasion to re-equip the army with the 2-pdr, avoiding the period of adaptation to production, and also of re-training and acclimatization with the new weapon. Consequently, 6 pounder production was delayed until November 1941 and frontline availability until spring 1942. Thus, during most of the North African Campaign, the army had to rely on the 2-pdr, augmented by the 25 pounder gun-howitzer functioning as an anti-tank gun—a role for which it was capable (at the expense of diverting it from its main artillery role). As German tank design evolved, anti-armour performance of the 2-pdr gradually became insufficient; however, the gun owes a large part of the bad reputation it gained during the campaign to the open terrain, which made the high-silhouette piece hard to conceal, and to poor tactics.

In North Africa, it was found that the 2-pdr was damaged by being towed long distances across rough, stony deserts. Starting in 1941, the British developed the "en portee" method of mounting the 2-pdr, and later the 6-pounder, on a truck. Though only intended for transport, with the gun carried unloaded, crews tended to fire from their vehicles for more mobility, with consequent casualties. Hence the vehicles tended to reverse into action so that the gunshield of the 2-pdr would provide a measure of protection against enemy fire. An infantry battalion anti-tank platoon would have eight guns on 3-ton lorries On 21 November 1941, during the battle of Sidi Rezegh, Second lieutenant George Ward Gunn of J Battery Royal Horse Artillery earned the Victoria Cross for his action with a 2-pdr. The troop of four portee 2-pdrs under his command engaged a German counter-attack of about 60 tanks. Three of the guns were knocked out, and all bar one gunner killed or fatally wounded. Despite the truck being on fire, Gunn manned the gun himself with a sergeant as his loader, engaging the enemy at 800 yards, he fired 40-50 rounds knocking out two tanks and damaging others before he was killed. The battery commander then took over.

From mid-1942, the 2-pdr was increasingly displaced to infantry anti-tank platoons, to Home Guard units in Great Britain, and to the Far East, where it was still effective against the smaller and more lightly armoured Japanese tanks. It was finally removed from service entirely in December 1945. As a vehicle weapon, it remained in use throughout the war. Although most tanks equipped with it were withdrawn or upgraded to the 6-pdr, it remained in use with armoured cars.

Its performance as an anti-armour weapon was improved later in the war with the development of more sophisticated ammunition and got an additional boost with the introduction of the Littlejohn adaptor, which converted it to a squeeze-bore design firing specially designed shells at much higher velocities. However, the Littlejohn adaptor prevented the use of High Explosive rounds. These improvements, however, were constantly outpaced by improvements in tank design.

As a tank gun, used stationary, the effective range was out to 1,500 yds.

== Ammunition ==
Available ammunition
Type	Model	Shot/shell	Round weight	Projectile weight	Filler	Muzzle velocity
Armour-piercing, tracer	Shell AP/T Mk IT	Shell		2.375 lb (1.077 kg)	11 drachms (19 g) Lyddite	807 m/s (2,650 ft/s)
Armour-piercing, tracer	AP/T Mk I	Shot	2.04 kg (4.5 lb)	1.08 kg (2.4 lb)		792 m/s (2,600 ft/s)
Armour-piercing, tracer, increased charge	APHV/T	Shot	2.04 kg (4.5 lb)	1.08 kg (2.4 lb)	-	853 m/s (2,800 ft/s)
Armour-piercing, capped, ballistic cap, tracer	APCBC/T Mk I	Shot	2.22 kg (4.9 lb)	1.22 kg (2.7 lb)	-	792 m/s (2,600 ft/s)
Armour-piercing, composite non-rigid (used with the Littlejohn adaptor)	AP/CNR (APSV (Note: "armour piercing super velocity")) Mk I	Shot	?	1.037 lb (0.470 kg)	-	1,280 m/s (4,200 ft/s)
Armour-piercing, composite non-rigid (used with the Littlejohn adaptor)	AP/CNR (APSV) Mk II	Shot	?	1.234 lb (0.560 kg)	-	1,189 m/s (3,900 ft/s)
Practice, tracer	Shot, Practice, Mk IT	Flathead Shot		2.375 lb (1.077 kg)	-	610 m/s (2,000 ft/s)
High-explosive, tracer	HE/T Mk II	Shell	1.86 kg (4.1 lb)	0.86 kg (1.9 lb)	3 oz (85 g) TNT or RDX	792 m/s (2,600 ft/s)

Estimated armour penetration (mm) (Note: Different methods of armour penetration measurement were used in different countries / periods. Therefore, direct comparison is often impossible)
Distance	100 yd (91 m)	500 yd (460 m)	1,000 yd (910 m)	1,500 yd (1,400 m)
AP (meet angle 30°)	53	47	40	34
APHV (meet angle 30°)	105	90	74	60
APCBC (meet angle 30°)	58	53	49	44

== Variants ==
Gun variants:

- Mk IX – main pre-war production version, with barrel of autofrettage construction
- Mk IX-A – Mk IX simplified for mass production
- Mk X – later production version, with forged barrel
- Mk X-A – Mk X with dimension tolerances reduced
- Mk X-B – main late-war vehicle version, fitted with the Littlejohn adaptor

Carriage variants:

- Mk I – carriage designed by Vickers
- Mk II – carriage designed by the Royal Arsenal

== Self-propelled mounts ==
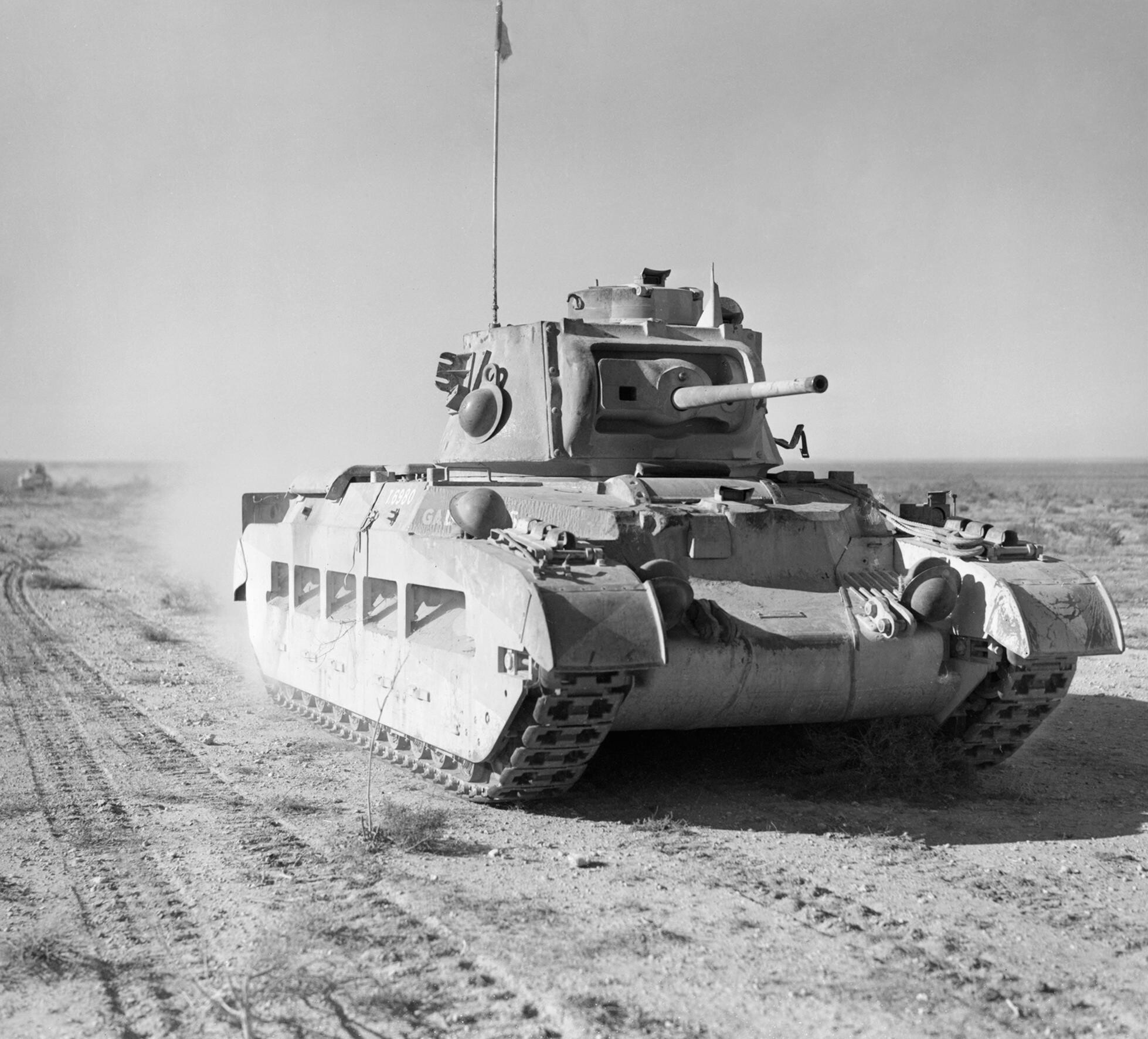
Matilda II

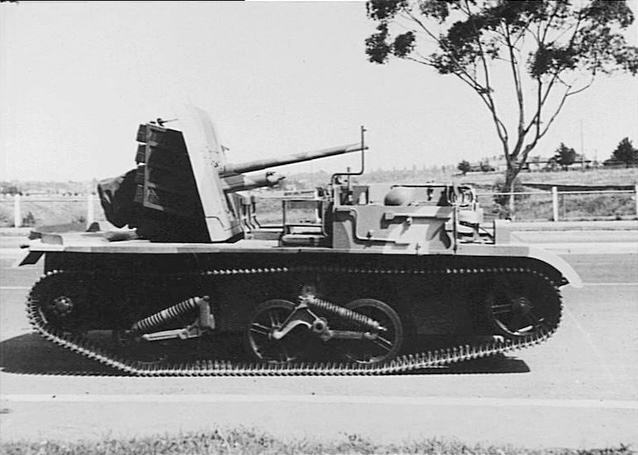
Australian 2 pounder anti-tank gun carrier

Tanks

- Light Tank Mk VII, Tetrarch
- Light Tank Mk VIII, Harry Hopkins
- Cruiser Tank Mk I
- Cruiser Tank Mk II
- Cruiser Tank Mk III
- Cruiser Tank Mk V, Covenanter
- Cruiser Tank Mk VI, Crusader – MkI and Mk II
- Infantry Tank Mk II, Matilda
- Infantry Tank Mk III, Valentine – Marks I to VII
- Infantry Tank Mk IV, Churchill – Mk I and Mk II
- Ram I (Canada)
- AC1 Sentinel (Australia)

Armoured cars

- AEC armoured car – Mk I
- Coventry armoured car
- Daimler armoured car
- Marmon-Herrington armoured car (South Africa) – Mk IV, and Mk VI prototype
- Rhino heavy armoured car (Australia, prototype only)

Other vehicles

- 2 pounder anti-tank gun carrier (Australia, used for training)
- Loyd Carrier (experimental)

== Surviving examples ==
- There is an Irish Army QF 2 pdr in the museum in Collins Barracks in Dublin City.
- Another QF 2 pdr is on display at the Canadian Military Heritage Museum in Brantford Ontario Canada.
- Two guns, one of them on an improvised carriage, are on display in the IDF History Museum (Batey HaOsef) in Tel Aviv, Israel.
- An Australian-made QF 2 pdr is on display at the Australian War Memorial.
- The "Wakenshaw Gun", part of the Durham Light Infantry Museum collection, is on display at "The Story" Museum and archive in Durham.

== See also ==
- QF 2 pounder naval gun "pom-pom" AA gun, of the same bore but with a pre-World War I heritage.
- British standard ordnance weights and measurements
- 37 mm gun M3, contemporary US equivalent
- 45 mm anti-tank gun M1937 (53-K)
- 45 mm anti-tank gun M1932 (19-K)
- 45 mm anti-tank gun M1942 (M-42), contemporary Soviet equivalents
- Type 94 37 mm anti-tank gun
- Type 1 37 mm anti-tank gun
- 25 mm Hotchkiss anti-tank gun
- Bofors 37 mm anti-tank gun
