= Besa machine gun =

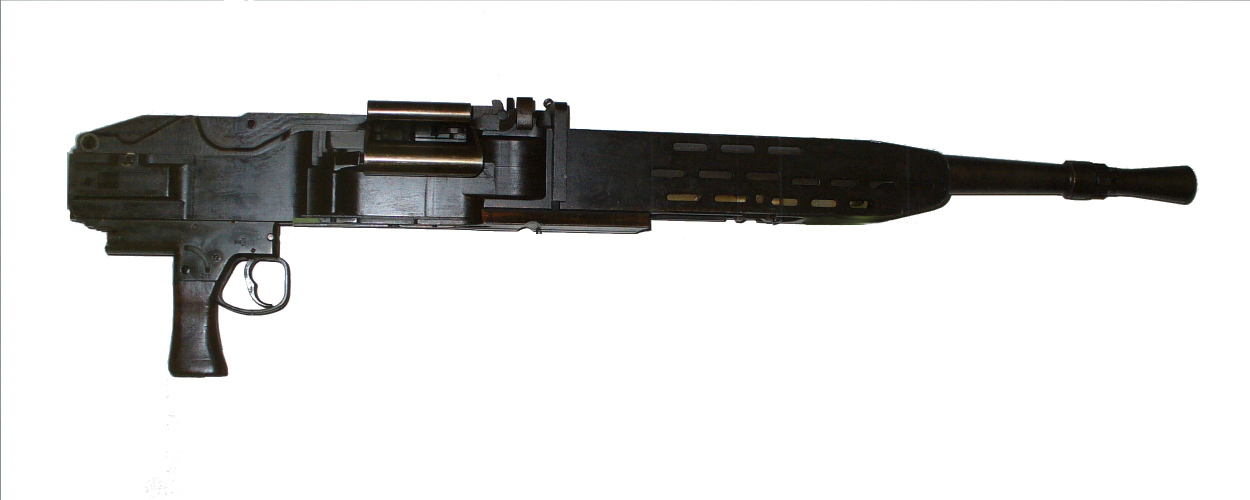
- Besa machine gun
- Type: Tank-mounted medium machine gun
- Place of origin: First Czechoslovak Republic (design); United Kingdom (manufacture)

Service history
- In service: 1939–1960s
- Used by: British Empire; Ireland; Israel
- Wars: World War II; 1948 Palestine war; Korean War; Suez Crisis; Lebanese Civil War

Production history
- Designer: Václav Holek
- Designed: 1936
- Manufacturer: The Birmingham Small Arms Company Limited
- Developed from: ZB-53
- Produced: 1939–1945
- No. built: 39,332 in all variants.
- Variants: Mark I (1939–1940); Mark II (1940–1943); Mark II* (1943); Mark III (1943–1951); Mark III* (1943–1952); Mark III/2 (1952–1966); Mark III/3 (1954–1966)

Specifications (Besa Mk II)
- Mass: 47 lb (21 kg) empty
- Length: 43.5 in (1,100 mm)
- Barrel length: 29 in (740 mm), 4-groove rifling with right-hand twist
- Cartridge: 7.92×57mm Mauser
- Calibre: 7.92mm
- Action: Gas automatic
- Rate of fire: 450–550 round/min (Low); 750–850 rounds/min (High)
- Muzzle velocity: 2,700 ft/s (823 m/s)
- Feed system: 225 metal link belt.

The Besa machine gun was a British version of the Czechoslovak ZB-53 air-cooled, belt-fed machine gun (called the TK vz. 37 in the Czechoslovak army (Note: "TK" from těžký kulomet "heavy machine gun"; "vz" from vzor "Model")).

The name came from the Birmingham Small Arms Company (BSA), who signed an agreement with Československá zbrojovka to manufacture the gun in the UK. The War Office ordered the weapon in 1938 and production began in 1939, after modifications.

It was used extensively by the armed forces of United Kingdom during the Second World War as a mounted machine gun for tanks and other armoured vehicles as a replacement for the heavier, water-cooled Vickers machine gun. Although it required a rather large opening in the tank's armour, it was reliable.

== Development and use ==
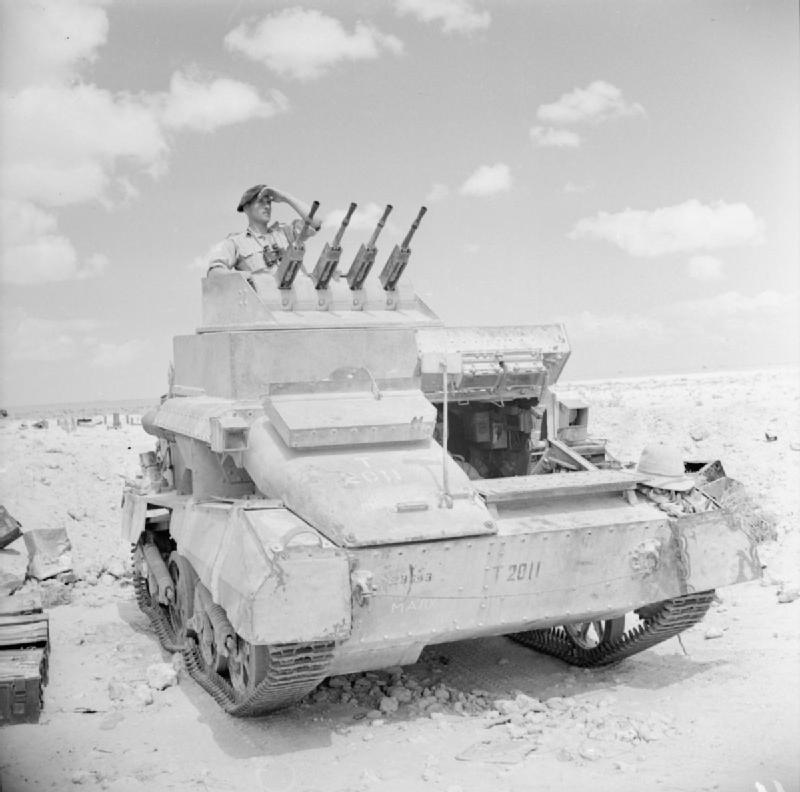
Vickers Light Tank AA Mk I with 4 Besa machine guns

Although British forces used the .303 in rimmed round for rifles and machine guns, the ZB-53 had been designed for the German 7.92×57mm Mauser round; referred to by the British as the 7.92 mm. The British had intended to move from rimmed to rimless ammunition but with war imminent, wholesale change was not possible. It was falsely believed by BSA and the Ministry of Supply that the industrial, technical and supply difficulty of converting the design to the .303 round would be more onerous than retaining the original calibre, especially given that the chain of supply for the Royal Armoured Corps was already separate from the other fighting arms of the British Army and the round was not changed for British production. Since the Besa used the same ammunition as Germany used in its rifles and machine guns, the British could use stocks of captured enemy ammunition, albeit without the ability to use their ammunition belts as packaged.

The .303 version of the ZB-53 was presented to the British officials in early 1937 and passed field trials in November 1937 with flying colours (0.5% of stoppages), however in September 1937 the Small Arms Committee had already decided it wanted the 7.92 mm version for which BSA was already tooling up because of the urgency.

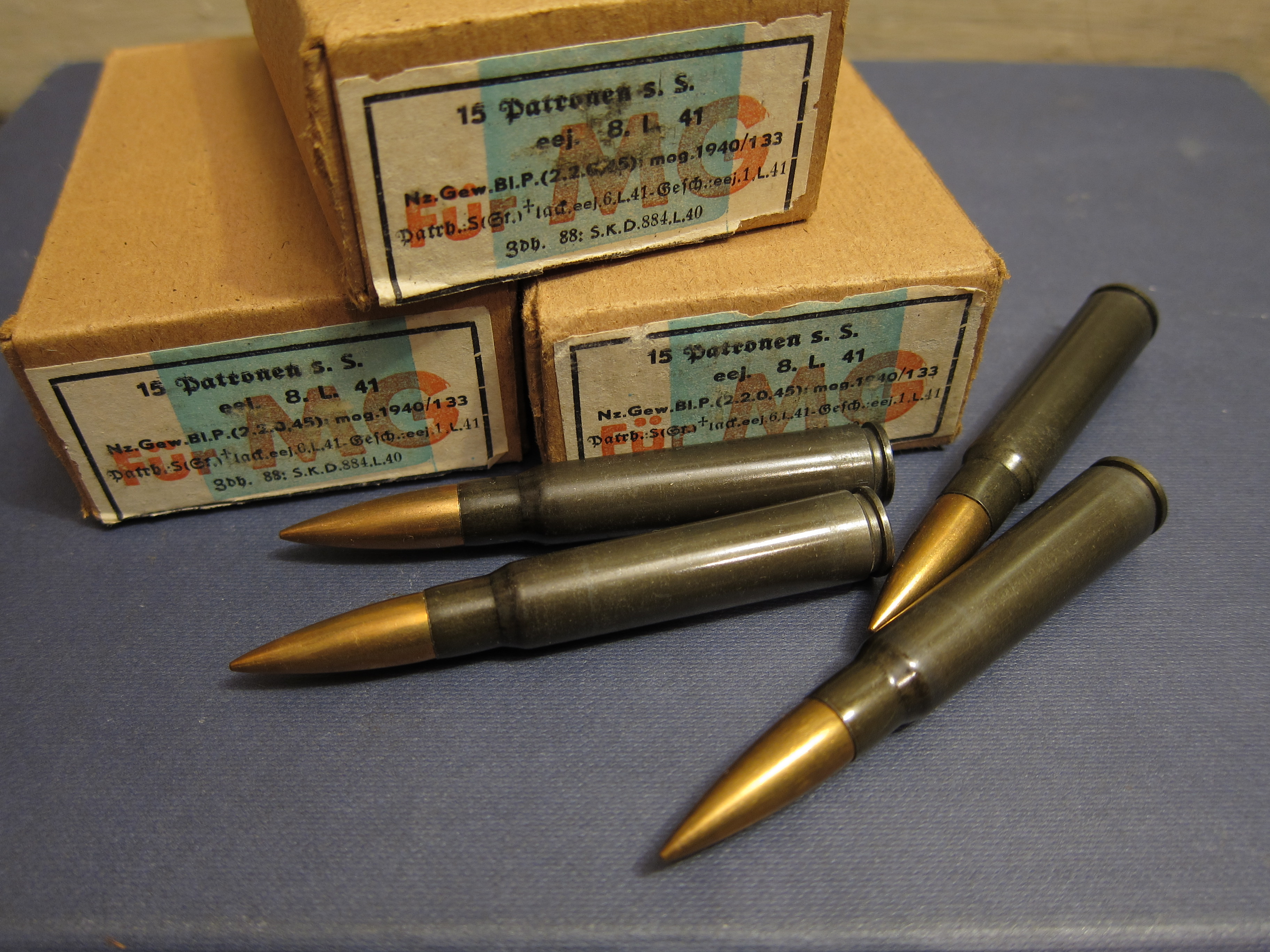
German 7.92×57mm Mauser ball ammunition dating from 1941. This ammunition could be used in the Besa if necessary.

The Mark II version, license-produced by BSA in Birmingham as opposed to ZB's Mk I, entered service in June 1940. The design was modified to be more rapidly and economically produced and three simplified models, the Mark II*, Mark III and Mark III*, entered service in August 1943. The Mark II* was a transitional model designed to use the new simplified parts but was compatible with the Mark II. All those versions had a selector to give a high rate of fire (750–850 rounds per minute) for close combat or focused targets or a low rate of fire (450–550 rounds per minute) for long-range combat or area targets. The Mark III and Mark III* versions did away with this selector and had simplified parts like the Mark II* but were incompatible with the Mark II. The Mark III had a fixed high rate of fire (750–850 rpm) and the Mark III* had a fixed low rate of fire (450–550 rpm) Damaged or malfunctioning Mark IIIs were converted to Mk III* at factories during repair.

The earlier wartime Mark I, Mark II and Mark II* versions of the Besa 7.92 mm were declared obsolete in 1951 and all Mark III versions were converted to Mark III*. The Mark III/2 introduced in 1952 was a conversion of the Mark III* with a new bracket and body cover. The later Mark III/3 introduced in 1954 was a conversion of the Mark III/2 that replaced the barrel and sleeve and made the gas vents larger on the gas cylinder to make it easier to use belts of mixed ammunition. The post-war Mark III/2 and Mark III/3 remained in service until the late 1960s.

7.92x57mm Besa ammunition
Designation	In Service	Markings
Cartridge S.A. Ball 7.92 m/m Mark Iz	May 1939 – November 1941	Purple annulus, Iz on headstamp.
Cartridge S.A. Ball 7.92 m/m Mark IIz	September 1941 – 1966	Purple annulus, IIz on headstamp
Cartridge S.A. Tracer 7.92 m/m G Mark Iz	October 1939 – November 1941	Red annulus, GIZ on headstamp
Cartridge S.A. Tracer 7.92 m/m G Mark IIz	September 1941 – 1945	Red annulus, GIIZ on headstamp
Cartridge S.A. Tracer 7.92 m/m G Mark 3z	April 1945 – 1966	Red annulus, G3Z on headstamp
Cartridge S.A. Armour-Piercing 7.92 m/m W Mark Iz	March 1941 – November 1941	Green annulus, WIZ on headstamp
Cartridge S.A. Armour-Piercing 7.92 m/m W Mark IIz	September 1941 – 1966	Green annulus, WIIZ on Headstamp
Cartridge S.A. Incendiary 7.92 m/m B Mark Iz	1942–1966	Blue annulus, BIZ on headstamp

== 15 mm Besa machine gun ==
15 mm Besa Mk II
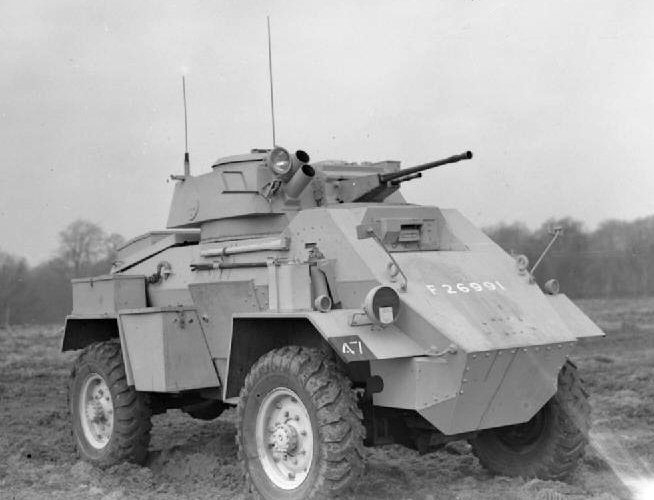
- Humber Armoured Car Mk 2 with 15 mm Besa HMG
- Type: Tank-mounted heavy machine gun
- Place of origin: British Empire

Production history
- Developed from: ZB-60
- No. built: 3,218 total production
- Variants: 15mm Besa Mark I (1939); 15mm Besa Mark II (1939 – 1949)

Specifications
- Mass: Gun: 121 lb (55 kg); Complete barrel: 50.5 lb (22.9 kg)
- Length: 2,050 mm (80.71 in)
- Barrel length: 1,460 mm (57.48 in)
- Cartridge: 15×104mm
- Calibre: 15 mm (0.59 in)
- Action: Gas operated, open bolt
- Rate of fire: 450 rounds/min
- Muzzle velocity: 2,680 ft/s (818.3 m/s)
- Feed system: 25-round link belt

A larger, heavier 15 mm version (also belt-fed) was developed by BSA from the Czechoslovak ZB-60 heavy machine gun as vehicle armament. It could be fired in semi-automatic mode as well as fully automatic. It was introduced in British service in June 1940 and was used on the Light Tank Mk VIC and on armoured cars such as the Humber Armoured Car Marks I–III. Over 3,200 15 mm Besa were manufactured until it was declared obsolete in 1949. It fired a 75 grams (1,160 gr) bullet from a 15×104 mm cartridge with a muzzle velocity of 818.3 m/s (2,685 ft/s) at a rate of 450 rounds per minute. The 15 mm Besa was fed from 25-round metal belts, which limited its practical rate of fire, although the weapon was usually used for single shots as it was difficult to fire accurately in automatic.

The British gave consideration to converting the 15 mm Besa to 20 mm caliber, the 15×104mm cartridge had the same diameter as the 20 mm Hispano cartridge, but these efforts never progressed beyond the design phase of development.

== See also ==
- Bren gun – another ZB design taken up by the UK
