= British military vehicle markings of World War II =

The use of markings on British military vehicles expanded and became more sophisticated following the mass production and mechanization of armies in World War II.

Unit marks were sometimes amended at the front to make them less visible when in view of the enemy. Certain other marks were however made more visible in front line areas, such as aerial recognition signs to avoid friendly fire.

There are practical purposes behind most signs such as: allied identification, bridge weight, gas detection, tactical signs, vehicle War Department number and convoy marks. Attempts were made to standardise the size, colour and location of marks, with varying degrees of success.

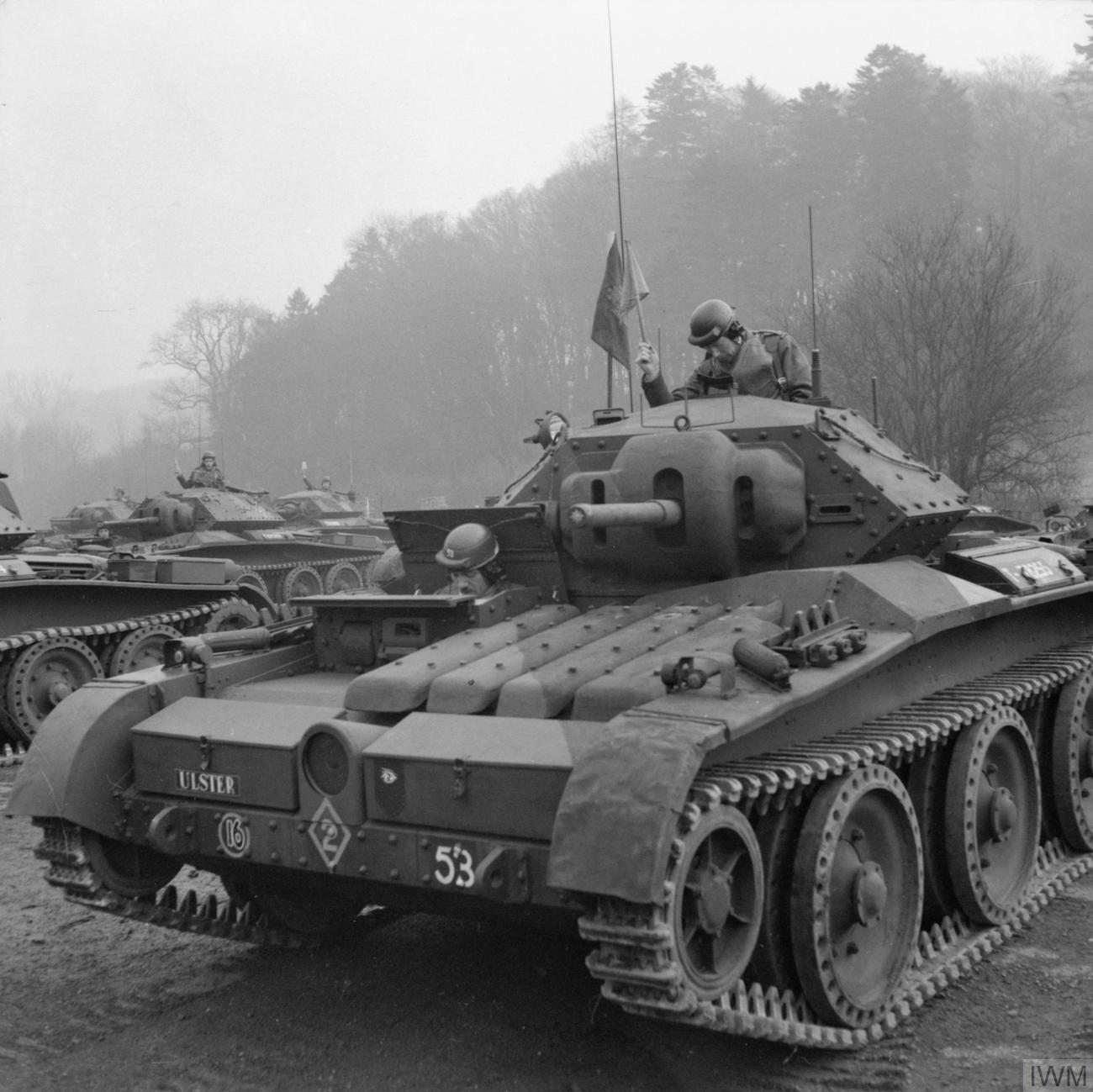
Covenanter tank with Guards armoured insignia on locker, 3rd senior AoS 53 (on wrong side) in white on red, tactical HQ diamond sign with 2 in centre, bridge plate with 16 modified to outlined in yellow, tank name ULSTER, WD number on side below turret

== History ==
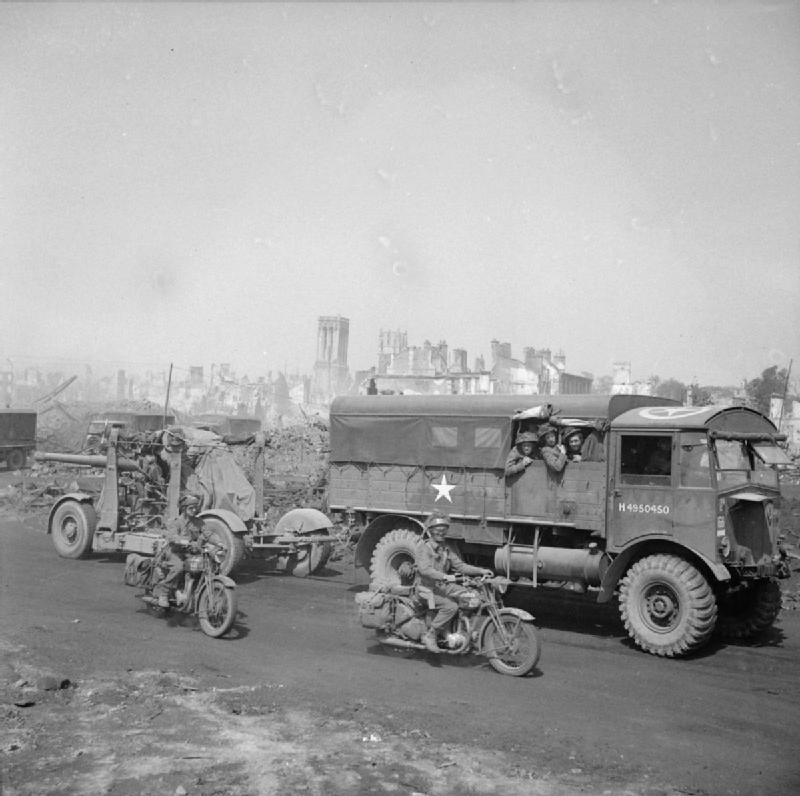
British AEC Matador lorry with allied star on side, aerial recognition on cab roof with H on cab door meaning artillery tractor followed by vehicle census number 4950450

The marking on military vehicles to identify the country or unit pre-dates the development of mechanical vehicles. The broad arrow used by the British Board of Ordnance to mark government property dates back from the 16th century.

Arm of service marks began with the use of service initials, such as S. & M. (Sappers and Miners), which pre-dated the RE (Royal Engineers).

During World War I, the system of identification developed as a result of necessity; formation signs were created before being abandoned after the war ended.

Army, Corps, Independent Brigade and Divisional marks generally use symbols. Regimental, Battalion and parts of a battalion marks tend to use numbers with symbols.

Vehicle registration numbers were used to identify vehicle type and the specific vehicle number. Armoured Fighting Vehicles (AFVs) sometimes adopted personal names. Other marks are used for information, such as weight or maximum speed, to identify friendly vehicles, or to identify the purpose, such as bomb disposal.

Markings usually used stencils. Accordingly, wartime markings are not generally as neat as a hand-painted pre-war mark; those being done in the field are sometimes in mirror image and often in the wrong location on the vehicle.

== National identification ==
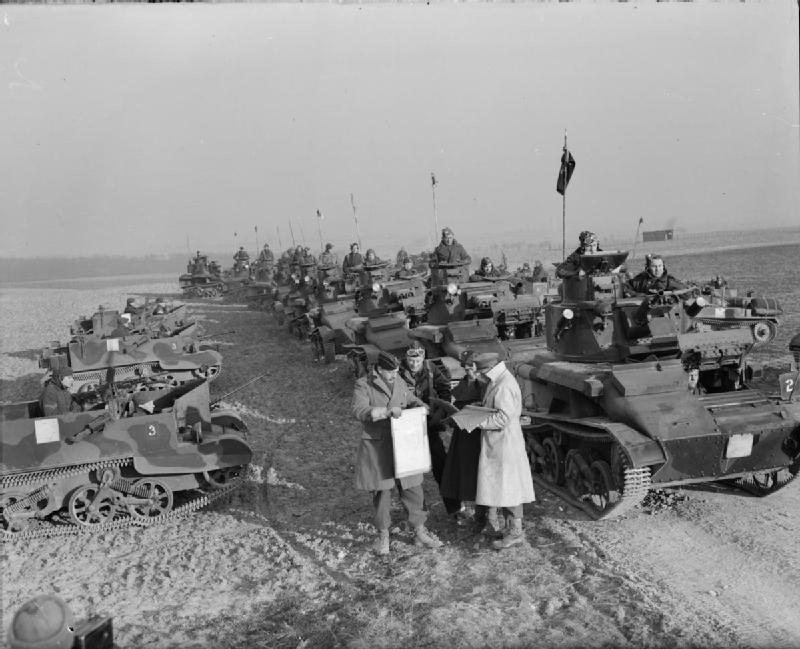
Bren gun carriers and Light Tank Mk VIs of 4/7th Royal Dragoon Guards with white squares during an exercise at Bucquoy, 12 January 1940

Prior to 1943, there was no formal British identification. However, BEF vehicles carried a white vertical rectangle patch, 12 inches by 15 inches, on the front of AFVs, on the front left mudguard of softskins and on the sides of carriers. Between 1939 and 1945, some vehicles featured a roundel on the bonnet, front wing, around the windscreen, doors, and on the rear of the vehicle. This was used in the European theatre prior to Dunkirk and after D-Day, in the western desert, and in Italy. In late 1941, an 18 inch square patch with three vertical stripes (white, red, white) was added to AFVs in the western desert. There were between one and six per vehicle in assorted places. In the spring of 1942, most UK AFV's were painted with a horizontal rectangular patch 18 inches by 10 inches with the same striping pattern as the desert design. Some had the RAC mailed fist flash instead, in a rectangle.

From mid-1943 the Allied star was used on the sides of softskin vehicles and AFVs. A painted Union flag was rarely seen in late war.

== Formation signs ==
21st Army Group

8th Army

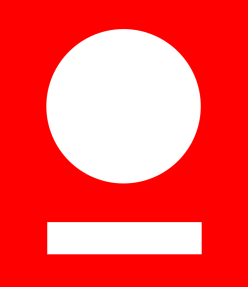
X Corps

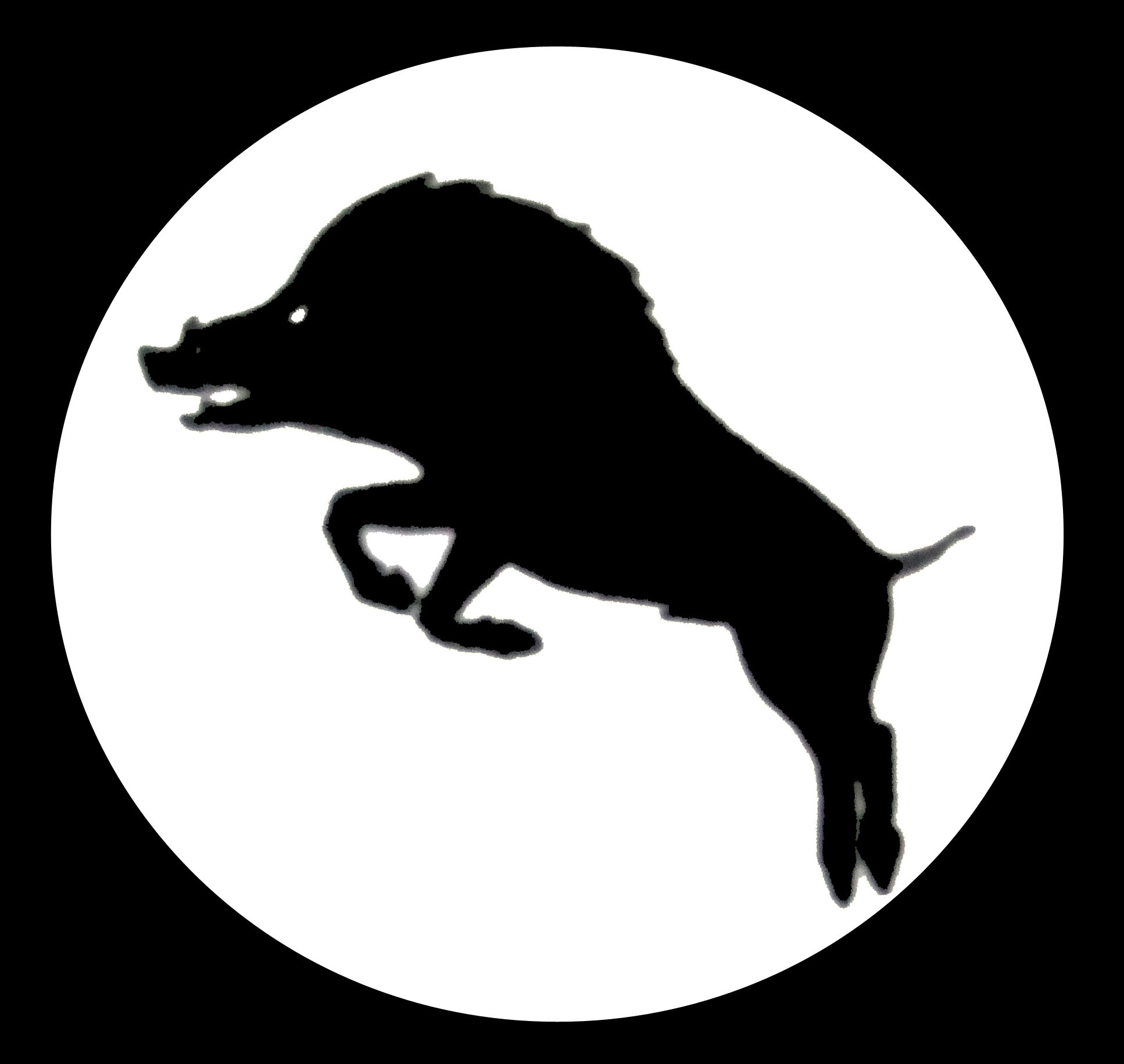
XXX Corps

23rd Independent Armoured Brigade

Each vehicle had to carry a formation sign, normally the formation they were permanently attached to. Thus, if temporarily attached to another unit, the vehicle would retain its normal sign unless instructed to adopt the temporary unit sign.

The sign was affixed to the front nearside (left) bumper, or close to it, such as a forward facing wing, and in a prominent position at the rear, also on the nearside. It was of similar size to the Arm of Service (AoS) 9 inch square sign, and was not supposed to be carried on motorbikes, but was sometimes painted on the sides of their fuel tank.

=== Army and Corps ===
Only vehicles attached to the headquarters of an Army and Corps would carry an insignia in place of regimental markings. This would include Army and Corps troops that were lent to sub units on an as-needed basis.

The Army and Corps vehicles carried normal Arm of Service markings, but with a white top bar.

=== Independent Brigades ===
Independent Brigades could be allocated a special formation sign, used by vehicles not within a division. The same sign was worn by soldiers on their sleeves. Some units stenciled the independent brigade sign on their vehicles whilst keeping their own divisional sign.

=== Divisions ===
Each division had its own insignia, carried by all vehicles. The same sign was worn by soldiers on their sleeves.

It was painted using a stencil, but occasionally hand-painted giving rise to variations. Stencils were on occasion reversed. A few vehicles, such as RASC companies carried both a Corps or Division sign and their company sign. The 21st Army Tank Brigade in North Africa painted the Infantry Division sign (4th) they were supporting, alongside their own.

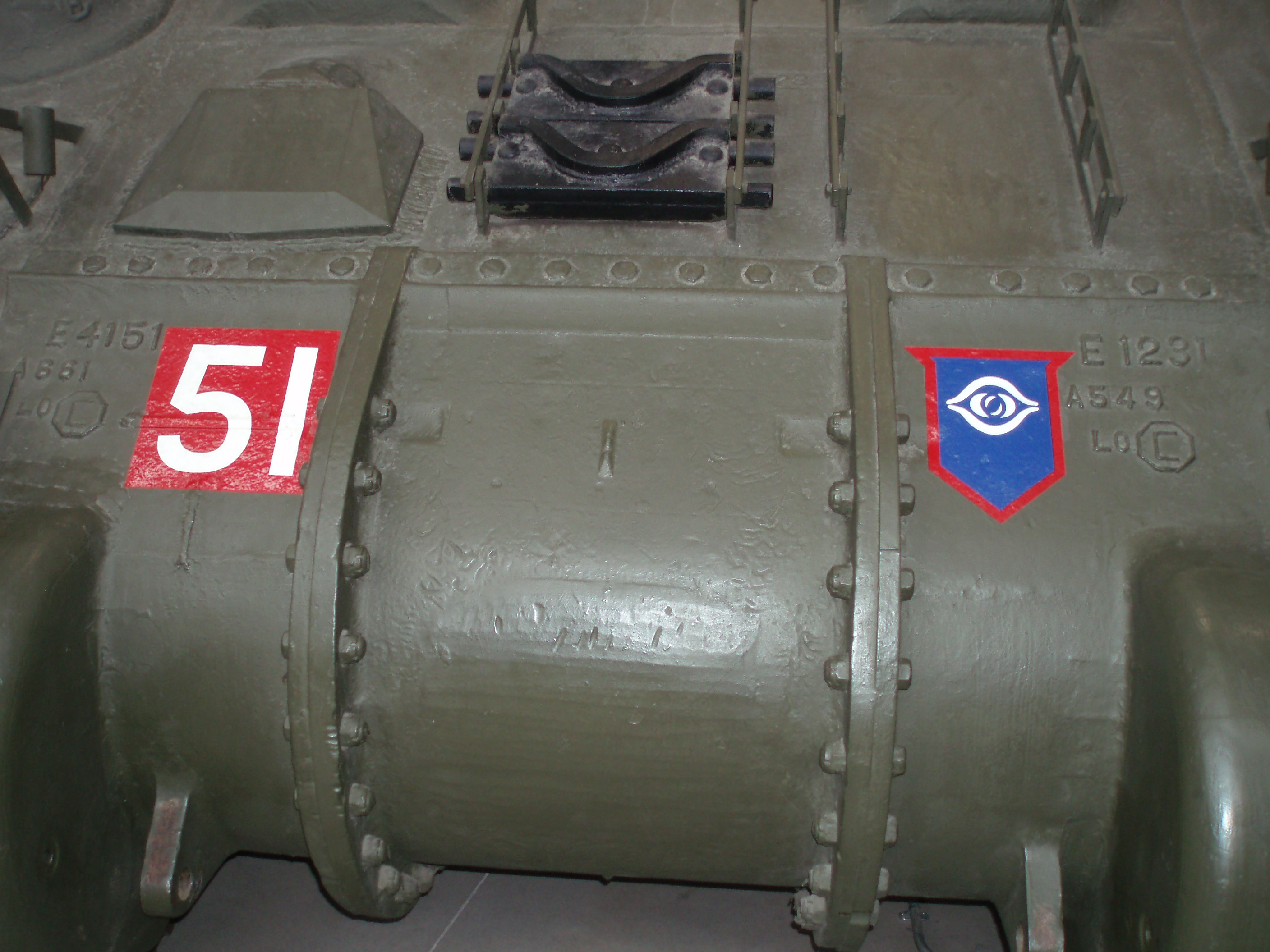
Guards Armoured Division

1st Armoured Div

6th Armoured Division

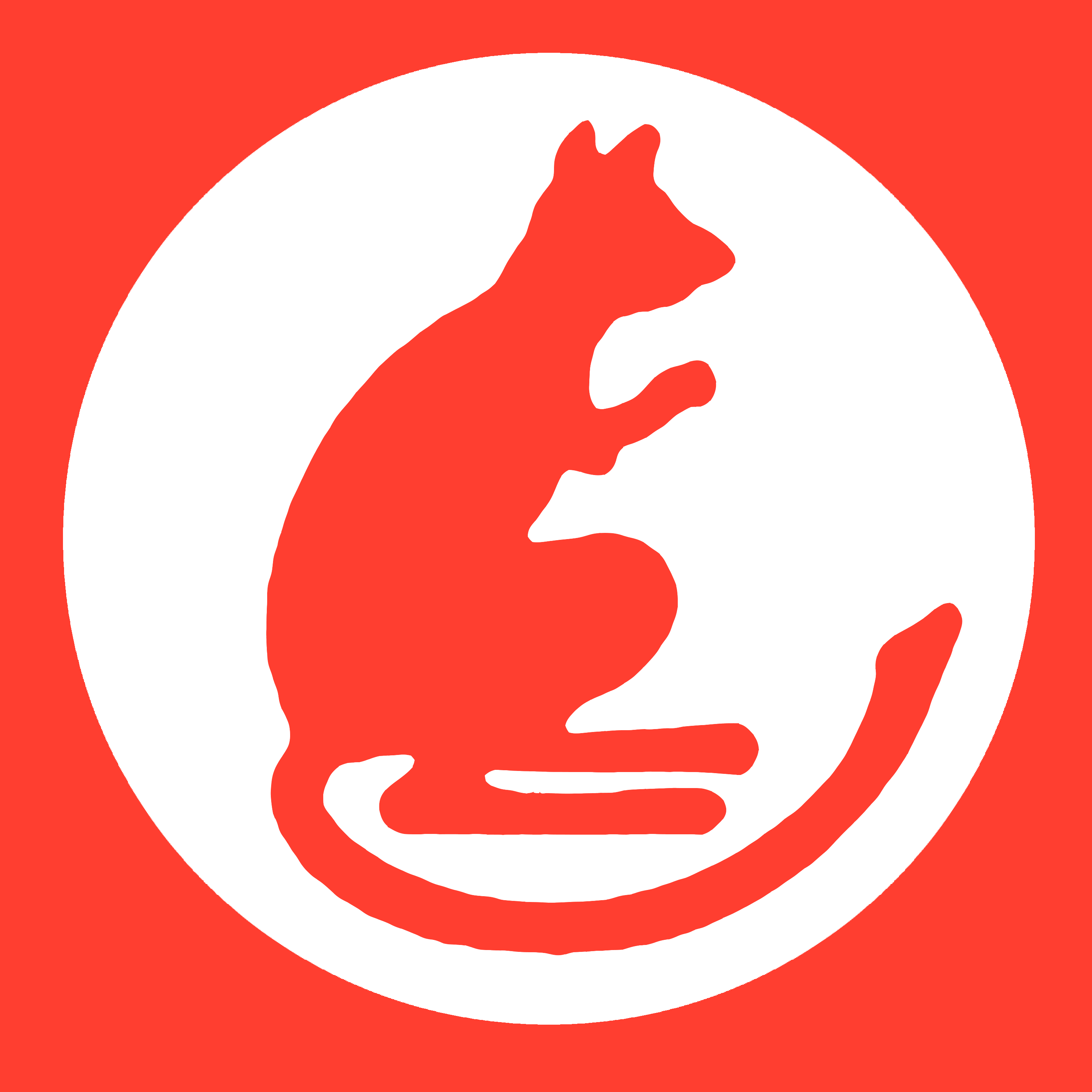
7th Armoured Division

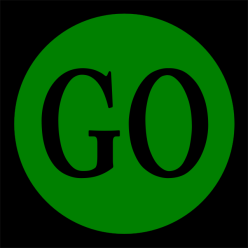
8th Armoured Division

11th Armoured Division

79th Armoured Division

2nd Infantry Division

3rd Infantry Division

British WWII 6th Infantry Division

43rd Infantry Division

50th Infantry Division

British Airborne Units

== Non formation signs ==
=== Arm of Service ===
Discussed in detail from May 1939, the system was summarised in a War Office letter of 12 April 1940 updated in 1941, 1942 and 1943.

All vehicles carried Arm of Service (AoS) markings comprising a 9 in (23 cm) square with a white two or three digit number (both one and four digits were occasionally used). Where the background colour is pale, the number may be coloured. The background colour explained the AoS, the number differentiated the AoS HQ, and the individual battalions or companies within that AoS.

Painted on the offside front bumper or nearby, dependent upon the vehicle, so may be on the front of the wing, glacis or with a jeep, below the windscreen. The sign is repeated on the offside rear. The size is adapted to suit the vehicle and space available.

12 April 1940 Infantry Division vehicle markings
Arm of Service colour	Infantry Division	Number
Black	Division HQ	1
Red over blue	Royal Artillery HQ	1
Blue	Royal Engineers HQ	1
Red over green diagonal	RASC HQ	1
Black	Employment platoon	1
Black	Section Intelligence Corps	1
Black	Divisional RAC	2
Red over blue	Field regiments	3, 4, 5
Red over blue	Anti tank Regt	6
Blue	Field park Royal Engineers	8, 9, 10
Black	Divisional signals	11
Red	HQ senior Infantry Brigade	12
Red	Senior Inf. Brig. anti tank company	33
Red	Infantry battalions	13, 14, 15
Green	HQ 2nd Inf. Brig.	16
Green	2nd Inf Brig anti tank company	34
Green	Infantry battalions	17, 18, 19
Brown	HQ junior Brig.	20
Brown	Junior Brig. anti tank company	35
Brown	Infantry battalions	21, 22, 23
Red over green	RASC divisional ammunition coy	24
Red over green	RASC divisional petrol company	25
Red over green	RASC divisional supply company	26
Black	Field Ambulance	27, 28, 29
Black	Field hygiene	30
Black	Divisional Provost company	31
Black	Divisional Postal unit	32

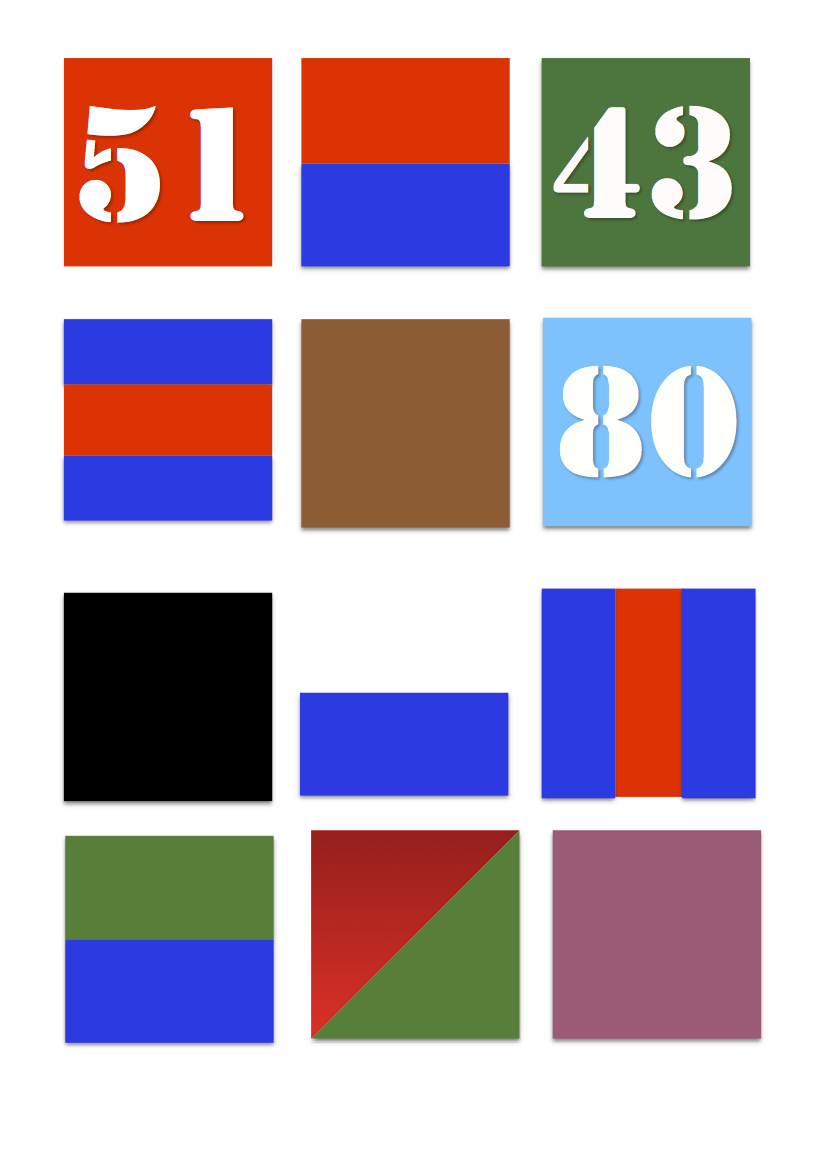

21st Army Group in North West Europe 1944–45
Arm of Service colour	Armoured Division	Infantry Division	Airborne Division
Black	Division HQ 40	Division HQ	
Maroon with light blue Bellerophon -on-Pegasus			Division HQ
Red	Armoured 50 51 52 53 54	Infantry Brig. 81 55 56 57	Para Brigade 81
Green	Infantry 60 61 62 63	Infantry Brig. 87 60 61 62	Para Brigade 87
Brown		Infantry Brig. 94 67 68 69	Airlanding Brigade 94 67 68 69
Red over dark blue	Royal Artillery 74 76 77	Royal Artillery 42 43 44; Anti Tank 46; Light Anti-Aircraft 47	Airlanding light artillery 46; Airlanding anti-tank 47; Airlanding light AA 48
Cobalt blue	Royal Engineers 41 46	Royal Engineers 49 50 51	
Red/Green diagonal	RASC 81 82 83 84	RASC 70 71 72 73	Universal Carrier 70 71 73
Maroon			(6th) Armoured Recce 79
Black	MG Company 64	MG Battalion 64	
Green over cobalt blue	Armoured Recce 45	Recce Regt. RAC 41	(1st) Airborne Recce 41
Green over cobalt blue white top stripe	Armoured Car Regt. 44		
Blue over yellow over red	R.E.M.E. 40	R.E.M.E.	
White over dark blue red numbers	Royal Signals 40	Royal Signals	
Three vertical stripes, blue red blue	RAOC 75 18		

A white top stripe indicates Corps troops.

A brigade HQ was the first number, then each battalion within the division, going from senior to junior, having a number increasing by one or more number. Service units, postal, provost, ambulance etc. would not have an HQ unit.

Troop-carrying vehicles may use removable plates with the AoS sign as they were regularly moved between divisions. They may also have signs that were twice the size, with a black square over the RASC sign, the unit information of the troop being transported being chalked on the black square.

Headquarters, provost, medical, training & postal units in a division used a black panel with white numbers.

=== War department census number ===
A letter designating the type of vehicle followed by a number painted white with 3½ inch high, 2 inch wide stencil on the sides of the bonnet and on the tailboard of softskins; if no bonnet, then on cab door. AFV's painted theirs on the sides, sometimes on glacis in early war. Light blue was used on airborne vehicles and black on vehicles with desert camouflage. Motorcycles used half-sized numbers on either side of the fuel tank or on plates front and back.

Each War Department allocated a sequence of numbers to paint onto the vehicles as they were built and left the factory.

In the 1930s census numbers began with the year.. 37... 38... etc. . By 1942 the system had changed with blocks of numbers of four to seven digits being issued. Canadian army vehicles used the same census number as British vehicles, with the addition of a prefix C.

War Department letter
Letter	Vehicle type
A	Ambulance
C	Motorcycle
D	Dragons (tracked towing vehicles)
E	Engineer vehicles (bulldozers)
F	Armoured scout car or armoured car
H	Tractor (artillery tractor)
L	Lorry (30cwt or heavier)
M	Car (including Jeep)
P	Amphibious
R	Rota trailer
S	Self-propelled artillery
T	Tracked vehicles (tank and universal carriers)
V	Van
X	Trailers
Z	Truck (15cwt and smaller), White scout car, halftrack

E, P and S were introduced later during the war until 1941. Then, in the middle east vehicles used WD instead of a prefix letter and often had the numbers repeated in Arabic. Pre-war civilian number plates on military vehicles continued during 1940 in the UK and in the BEF.

=== Aerial recognition symbols ===
There were no formal instructions before the war, but experiments included:

- 1941 (1) A 2in white border around the turret top of AFVs
- 1941 (2) A yellow fabric triangle to indicate an AFV radio vehicle
- 1941/2 A white St Andrews cross on lorries in North Africa

In January 1942, an RAF style roundel was introduced. It was 31 inches wide, to be placed on the cab roof or bonnet of lorries and the turret or engine deck of armoured vehicles. The roundel comprised a 6-inch yellow surround, a 10-inch blue band, a 10-inch white band, and a 5-inch red centre. It was used in the UK, the Middle East and Italy.

From 1943, an allied white five-pointed star within a white circle was adopted, painted on a horizontal surface of a size suitable for the surface area, standard diameter being 15 to 60 inches. The circle was sometimes complete, sometimes broken at the star points. Not to be placed where the star would be covered by equipment, canvas, fuel cans etc. On a horizontal surface, a point faced the front of the vehicle, on a glacis a point faced upwards.

Allied aerial recognition star in circle
Vehicle	Location	Diameter inches
Car	Roof	36
Jeep	Bonnet	15
Command car	Bonnet	20
30cwt	Bonnet	20 or 25
2 ½ ton	Bonnet or cab roof	32
4 ton	Bonnet or cab roof	25 or 32
Scout car	Bonnet	36
Halftrack	Bonnet	36
M8	Engine deck	36
Light tank	Turret top	20
Medium tank	Engine deck	36

Around 1944, a coloured plastic panel supplemented the star on some vehicles in pink, yellow or white, or with a colour of the day chosen randomly.

=== Allied star ===
A five-pointed star, painted white, was used to identify Allied vehicles from 1944. British tanks rarely had stars on the front or sides, normally just one on the rear of the turret. AFV's often carried stars on the sides and rear. Softskins normally carried stars on their sides. The star was normally 8-12 inches and was stencilled with a point upwards.

=== Bridge rating ===
All vehicles had a bridge rating, displayed on a yellow circle, with black writing. The circle was for most vehicles on an attached plate, 7½ inches to 9 inches diameter. Tanks and many other AFVs had the marking painted on their hull. The location is normally offside front, sometimes attached to radiators.

The number equated to the bridge category, very roughly based on weight with adjustments for axle loading and impact factors, rounded up. Where the vehicle normally has a trailer, the writing showed two numbers, the upper being the loaded vehicle with the loaded trailer, the lower just the loaded vehicle.

Bridge classification
Class	Vehicle
1	2–3 seat car, 10cwt GS trailer
2	2–7 seat car, including Jeep, 8cwt truck, 15cwt and 1 ton trailer
3	heavy car, bren carrier, light recce car, light ambulance, Chevrolet 8cwt truck, 3-ton trailer
4	Daimler Dingo, Humber scout car, light ambulance, 15cwt GS truck, most Universal Carriers
5	most 15cwt trucks, 30cwt GS truck, White scout car, ambulance, Humber staff car, Windsor universal carrier, Lynx, 4 wheel trailer
6	most 30cwt trucks, some 3-ton trucks, Morris C8 "quad" tractor, 6-pounder gun
7	3-ton GS truck, Daimler armoured car, Humber armoured car, Tetrarch light tank
8	some 3-ton trucks including petrol, wireless and command, M14 multiple gun motor carriage half-track, International Harvester 15cwt half-track, 5 ton GS trailer
9	DUKW, 6 wheel 3-ton trucks such as machinery, most 6x4 vehicles, some 6x6 vehicles
10	7 ton truck, 6 wheeled light recovery trailer, AEC 6-ton lorry, some 6x4 vehicles
11	Diamond T GS and pontoon 4 ton truck
12	AEC Matador, AEC armoured command vehicle, 5–6 ton 4x2 lorries, Diamond T machinery trucks
14	AEC armoured car, A13 Cruiser tank, 6 ton 6x4 lorry
15	M3 Stuart tank, Staghound armoured car
16	Valentine tank
17	6-ton 6x6
18	Valentine bridgelayer, Diamond T transporter tractor
24	Matilda tank
30	Cromwell tank, Sexton self-propelled gun, Ram tank
33	M10, Sherman tank
40	Churchill tank

A Jeep, if it had a trailer, would have 3/2. A 15cwt truck with a trailer could have 5/4, 6/4 or 6/5 or 7/5, dependent upon the vehicle load and trailer size and load. A Diamond T transporter tractor with a trailer with a Sherman should carry 70/18 on its plate.

Motorbikes and sidecars did not have bridge plates. They fell into category 1.

In the field, the bright yellow sign facing forward was considered too visible so was often toned down, repainted as a yellow hollow circle, or discarded.

=== Tactical signs ===
Tactical signs used on AFV's, HQ Squadron – hollow diamond, A Squadron – hollow triangle, B squadron – hollow square, C squadron – hollow circle and D squadron – solid vertical bar, indicated the squadron within a regiment. Divisional troops and unbrigaded units such as armoured car and armoured recce regiments used white tac signs. Within an armoured brigade, each regiment used a different colour which indicated their seniority (Red for the senior regiment, yellow for the 2nd regiment, blue for the junior regiment, and green for the motorised infantry battalion).

They were 8-12 inches high, depending on the size of the vehicle, and were usually located on the sides or rear of the turret, or on the sides of the hull. They sometimes included a number identifying the individual vehicle.

=== Gas detection ===
Gas detection panels were painted as an 18-inch square patch on AFV's and on the rear of headlamps of softskins until October 1943, thereafter as a patch on bonnets of softskins, close to the windscreen and not on AFV's. The gas detection paint was a khaki yellow colour.

== Other markings ==
=== Convoy marking ===
A number, written in chalk, to mark convoy position, written on front of vehicle. The lead vehicle flew a blue flag, the rear vehicle a green flag.

A small light shining on the rear axle, the centre of which was painted white, assisted night time convoys. Some vehicles used a circular disc painted white.

=== Left hand drive ===
Vehicles that were left-hand drive had CAUTION LEFT HAND DRIVE in 2-inch white letters on the rear. If the vehicle does not have indicators, the words NO SIGNALS were added.

=== Civilian vehicles ===
Requisitioned vehicles, before receiving their full markings, displayed WD in 6 inch letters on the nearside front and back.

=== Speed limit ===
Maximum permitted speed limited was painted in red on the rear tailboard of softskins. The speed 4 inch high above MPH in 2 inch letters (not put on Bomb disposal vehicles or motorbikes).

=== Shipping and rail loading marks ===
Temporary 5 or 6 digit number chalked or roughly painted prior to shipping overseas. There may also be the landing craft number marked on the vehicle, such as "LST 368". Two or three colour horizontal stripes in a rectangle were sometimes painted next to the number, being specific to a vehicle movement order. Vehicle size and weight were chalked on a square painted black panel with a white edge.

Vehicles and trailers shipped on aircraft had a vertical yellow 6 inch line, ¾ inch wide, showing the centre of gravity, ½ inch wide on motorbikes.

=== Personalised markings ===
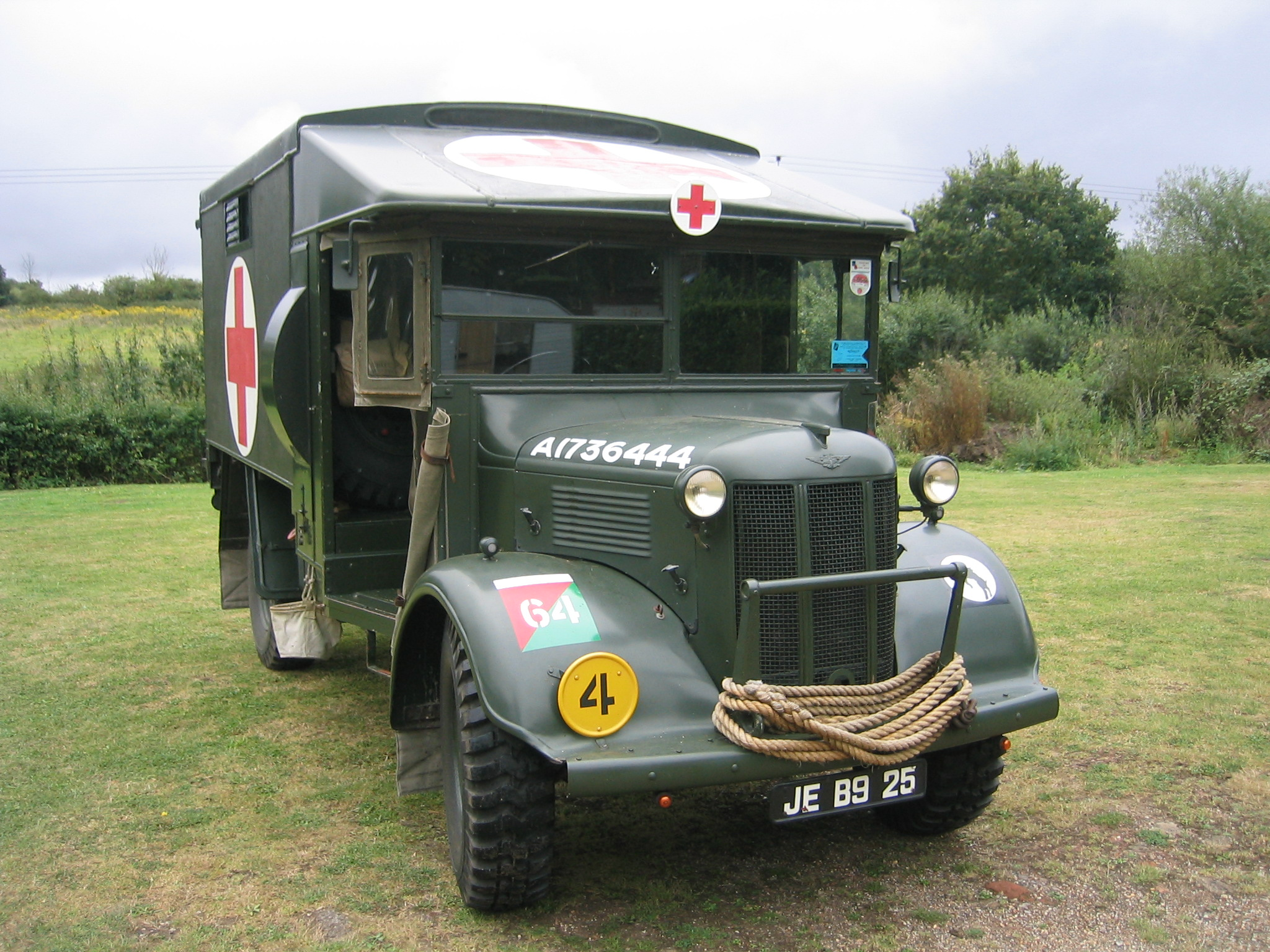
Austin K2/Y ambulance with red cross on side and roof top, with small cross on front windscreen disc. WD census number A1736444 on bonnet side, RASC red over green with 64 and Corps white top bar. Bridge classification 4. XXX Corps black boar on white background formation sign (modern number plate).

AFVs, mainly tanks, sometimes had names painted on their exterior to aid identification to other tankers. Troop B, using names that were often themed, such as flowers, villages, or girls names beginning with B.

Slogans and graffiti were on occasions added, sometimes inspiring – Berlin or Bust, wishful thinking – Home by Christmas, mottos – Death or Glory, poetry, a person's or place name, crude slang, comic etc. Using paint or chalk these unofficial markings were discouraged but existed.

== Specialist vehicles ==
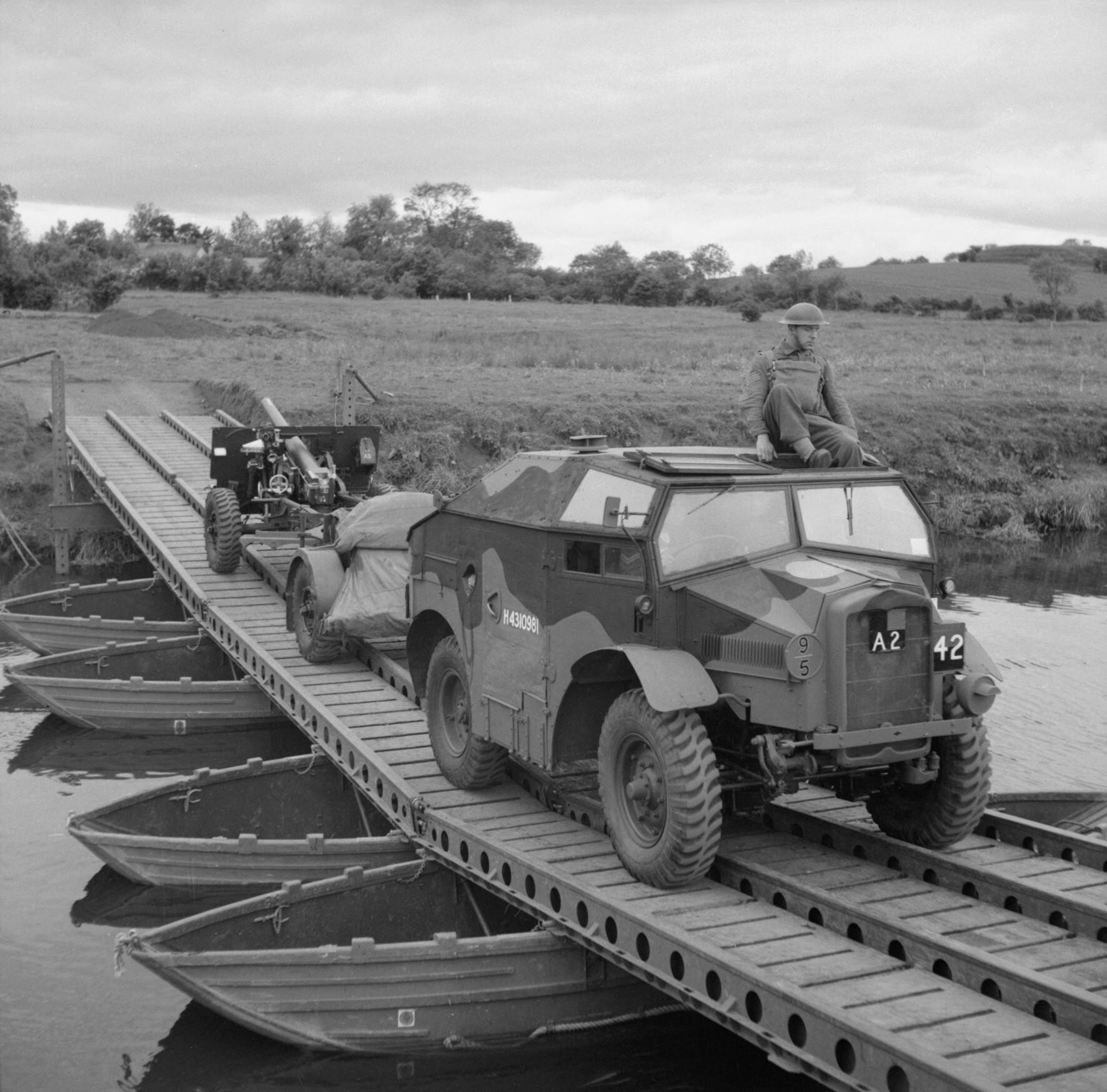
Royal Artillery quad, towing 25-pounder and limber, displaying 42 red over blue AoS sign on wrong wing, bridge plate 9/5, WD number H4310981 on cab door, central square plate with red square top right on blue background, meaning 1st battery and A2 being vehicle/gun number.

=== Bomb disposal ===
Bomb disposal vehicles had bright red painted wheel arches. The words BOMB DISPOSAL or B.D.S. in 4 inch red letters on the front of vehicle. Near side lights to have blue filter. Vehicle may show a red flag.

=== Ambulance ===
Conforming with international recognition, a white square of maximum size for vehicle on roof and both sides with a red cross. At rear on each door a white 18 inch circle with red cross.

=== RAF vehicles ===
The RAF roundel instead of formation sign on right front and right rear bumper or mudguard. They also wore a code consisting of a letter indicating the Command and a number indicating the group, in white. e.g. B/3 Indicating 3 Group, Bomber Command. Vehicles in Europe after D-Day would wear 'TAF' followed by the group number ( 2, 83, 84, 85) Vehicle numbers were RAF – followed by up to six digit number, usually on the front and rear, but sometimes following army practice. From 1943 a 4 digit type number would be painted on the door, or side of the cab. After Jan 1945, mobile units wore a the unit number and a three letter code indicating the type of unit, in a hollow white rectangle, e.g. 2679 MSU. The official air recognition symbol for RAF vehicles was the roundel, which was normally placed on the sides of the body.

=== Artillery and anti-tank guns ===
Guns rarely carried any normal marking on the gun shield. No tactical signs were used. The Royal Artillery had a system of red and blue flashes to indicate sub units, with a red square moving clockwise over a blue background to indicate 1st, 2nd, 3rd and 4th battery.

=== Other ===
Military police, Royal Navy-RN, Royal Marines-RM and NAAFI signs were painted on their vehicles and trailers.

== Examples of other units and markings ==
Brigade	Unit	Vehicles	AoS	AoS colour	Tac colour
8th Armoured Brigade	HQ	Sherman DD	993	Red with white stripe across bottom	White
8th Armoured Brigade	4th/7th Royal Dragoon Guards	Sherman DD	994	Red with white stripe across bottom	Red
8th Armoured Brigade	24th Lancers	Sherman DD	995	Red with white stripe across bottom	Yellow
8th Armoured Brigade	Nottingham Yeomanry	Sherman DD	996	Red with white stripe across bottom	Blue
8th Armoured Brigade	12th Battalion KRRC	Half tracks	475	Red with white stripe across bottom	Bright Green
31st Army tank Brigade	HQ	Churchill	990	Green with white diagonal	White
31st Army tank Brigade	7th RTR	Churchill	991	Green with white diagonal	Red
31st Army tank Brigade	9th RTR	Churchill	992	Green with white diagonal	Yellow
31st Army tank Brigade	141st RAC	Churchill	993	Green with white diagonal	Blue
33rd Army tank Brigade	HQ	Sherman	172	Red with white stripe across bottom	White
33rd Army tank Brigade	1st Northamptonshire Yeomanry	Sherman	173	Red with white stripe across bottom	Red
33rd Army tank Brigade	144th RAC	Sherman	174	Red with white stripe across bottom	Yellow
33rd Army tank Brigade	148th RAC	Sherman	175	Red with white stripe across bottom	Blue

== See also ==
- British armoured fighting vehicles of World War II
- British Army during the Second World War
- U.S. military vehicle markings of World War II
