= Simplex Manufacturing Corporation =

Defunct American motorcycle manufacturer

Simplex Servi-Cycle
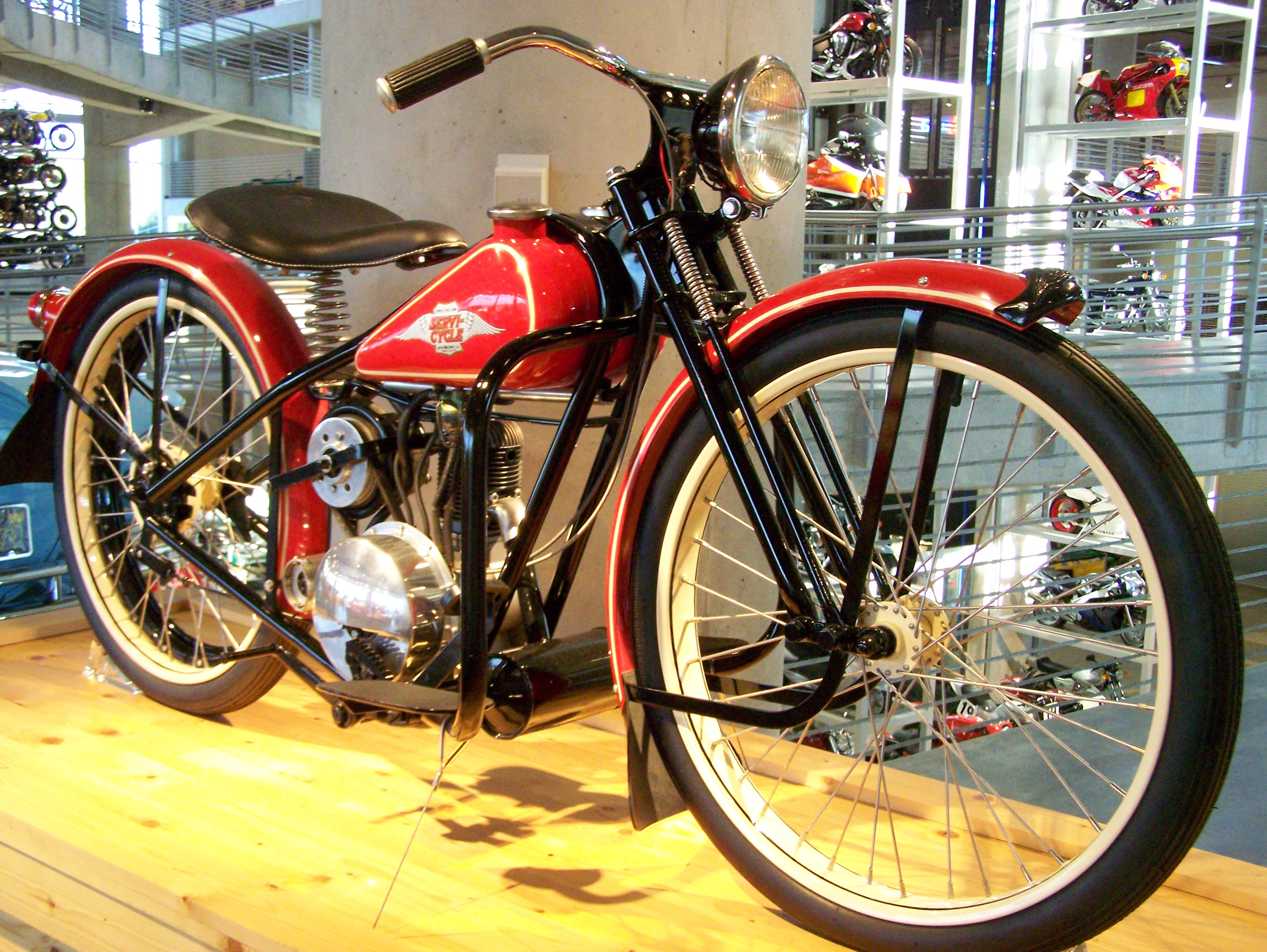
- Manufacturer: Simplex Manufacturing Corporation
- Also called: Wizard
- Production: 1935-1960
- Class: Lightweight standard
- Engine: Single cylinder two-stroke 7.9 cu. in. (130 cc)
- Bore / stroke: 2 x 2.53 inch
- Compression ratio: 6.5:1
- Power: 4 hp at 5000 rpm
- Ignition type: magneto (by Phelon, later Wico) and dual spark plugs
- Transmission: 1935-1941: direct drive, no clutch 1941-1953: direct drive with clutch 1953-1960: variable-speed automatic
- Frame type: double-loop tube frame
- Suspension: Front: short rocker arms and two coil springs on top of suspension tubes Rear: None, rigid
- Brakes: Front: None; Rear: 5 inch drum brake operated by pedal on right side.
- Tires: 26 x 2.50
- Wheelbase: 47 inch
- Weight: 135 pounds (dry)
- Fuel capacity: 2.5 gallons

Simplex Manufacturing Corporation was an American manufacturer that made motorcycles from 1935 to 1975. Between 1935 and 1960, Simplex made variations of the Simplex Servi-Cycle including the 1953–1960 Simplex Automatic. Simplex was the only motorcycle manufacturer located in the Deep South for many years, until Confederate Motorcycles began production.

== History ==
Simplex was founded by Paul Treen (father of United States Congressman and Louisiana Governor David Conner Treen) in New Orleans, Louisiana in the late 1920s with an initial investment of $25. Treen had been a dealer in Harley-Davidson motorcycles and had pitched them the idea of making a lightweight motorcycle for young riders. When Harley-Davidson rejected the idea, Treen decided to enter the market himself and designed his Servi-Cycle. The Simplex Servi-Cycle was introduced in 1935.

Although Simplex Manufacturing Corporation produced motorcycles for over 20 years, the last Simplex Automatics looked almost the same as the company's original 1935 Simplex Servi-Cycle motorcycle. Paul Treen would often visit the factory's tool shop and work with the engineers on new ideas himself, resulting in continuous improvements to Simplex products instead of annual new model introductions.

Western Auto sold Simplex motorcycles under the Wizard brand in the mid-1950s.

Simplex's minimalist philosophy was maintained throughout the company's history, whose designs changed little after 1935. By the 1950s Simplex's designs were primitive, leading to the end of Servi-Cycle and Automatic production in 1960. Simplex continued to make minibikes and karts using proprietary small engines until 1975, when Simplex went out of business. Treen had sold the company three years earlier, in 1972. Simplex was the only motorcycle manufacturer located in the American South.

A 1935 Simplex Servi-Cycle motorcycle is currently on display in the Smithsonian Institution's America on the Move exhibit.

== Engine ==
The two-stroke engine had a rotary valve and an "overhung" crankshaft with only one main bearing. A kick-starter was added by 1953.

The Servi-Cycle was claimed to have a fuel economy of 100 mpg_{‑US} (120 mpg_{‑imp}; 2.4 L/100 km).

The Servi-Cycle used a magneto of Simplex's own design, providing 6 volt electricity for the dual ignition and for the headlight, taillight and stoplight. The engine had dual spark plugs in its cylinder head.

== Transmission ==
The original Servi-Cycle design had the engine drive the rear wheel by belt, with no transmission or clutch, requiring the engine to be shut off while the cycle is at rest. In 1941, a pedal-operated clutch was added.

By 1950, Simplex added a belt-type automatic transmission. The ratio was changed by expanding and contracting the drive pulley, with a low ratio of approximately 18:1 and a high ratio of approximately 7:1. The transmission was belt-driven and drove the real wheel by belt, with automatic belt tensioning by jockey pulley.

== Military ==
=== World War II ===
The Simplex Manufacturing Company had a single major contract to provide its Model G Servi-Cycle for use by paratroopers in World War II. 152 units were delivered in 1942, and 500 more in 1943, for a total of 652. The contract was valued at $136,000 ($2.62 million in 2024), giving a unit cost of $208.59 ($4,014 in 2024).

These cycles are fitted with blackout headlight covers and a large secondary muffler by the rear wheel. They are painted green with a white five-pointed star on the sides of the fuel tank. They are not fitted with front crash bars.

=== Post War ===
Some later model Servi-Cycles were issued to heavy bomber crews for use as base run-arounds. These typically feature a front crash bar.

== Simplex Automatic scooter ==
In 1956, Simplex began manufacturing a scooter based on the Simplex Automatic drivetrain. The scooter was not made in large numbers and was discontinued in 1960 along with the Servi-Cycle.
