= Field Artillery Tractor =

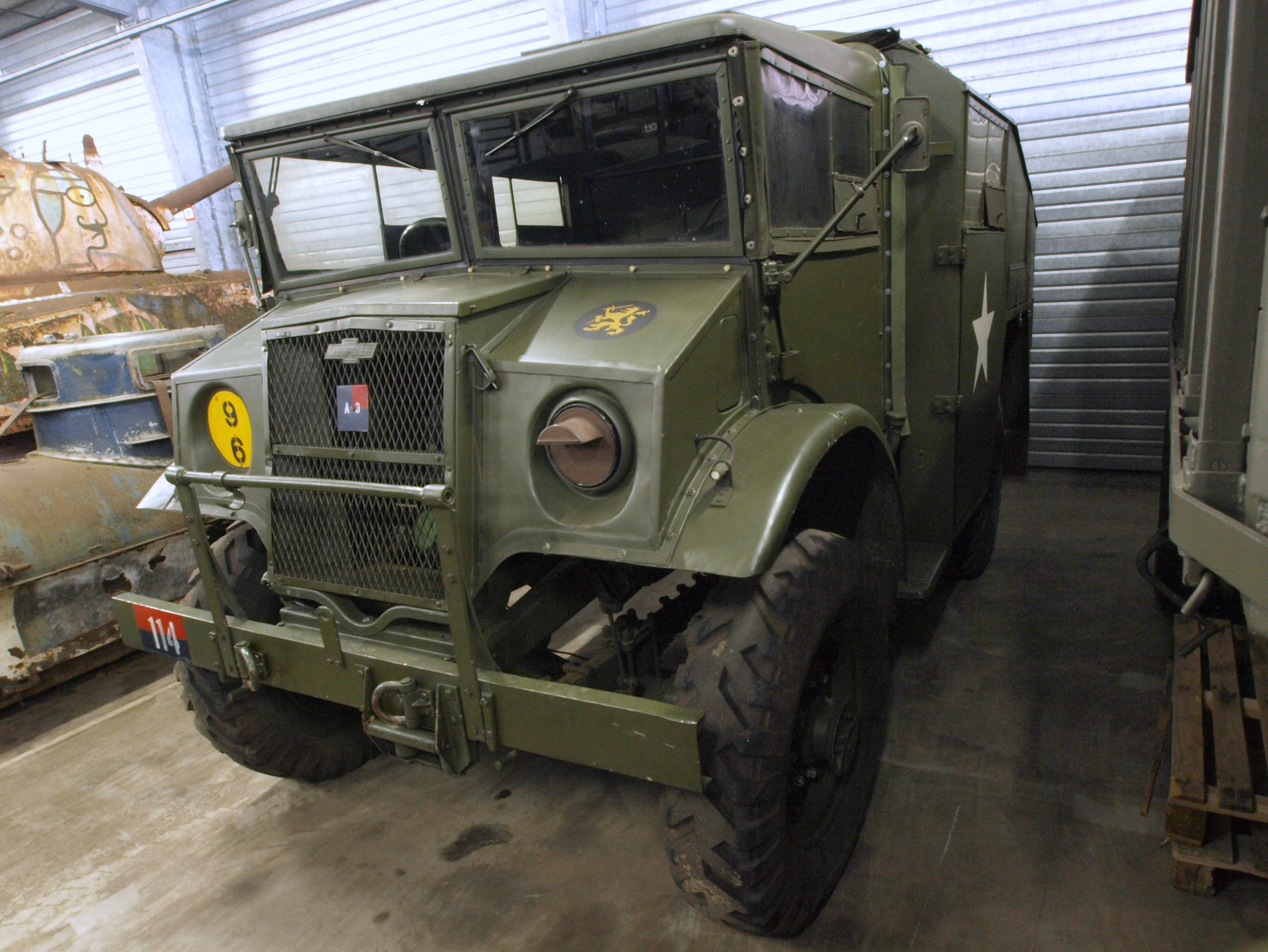
Chevrolet CMP Field Artillery Tractor

A Field Artillery Tractor or FAT is a specific sub-type of Artillery tractor used for towing a piece of Field Artillery ordnance and sometimes (notably the 25 pounder) also its limber. Field artillery includes field guns and howitzers but excludes anti-tank guns, although FATs could also be used to tow the latter. As such FATs were generally, although not exclusively, soft-skinned vehicles.

== See also ==
- Morris C8
- AEC Matador
- Scammell Pioneer
