= Guy Lizard =

British armoured command vehicle

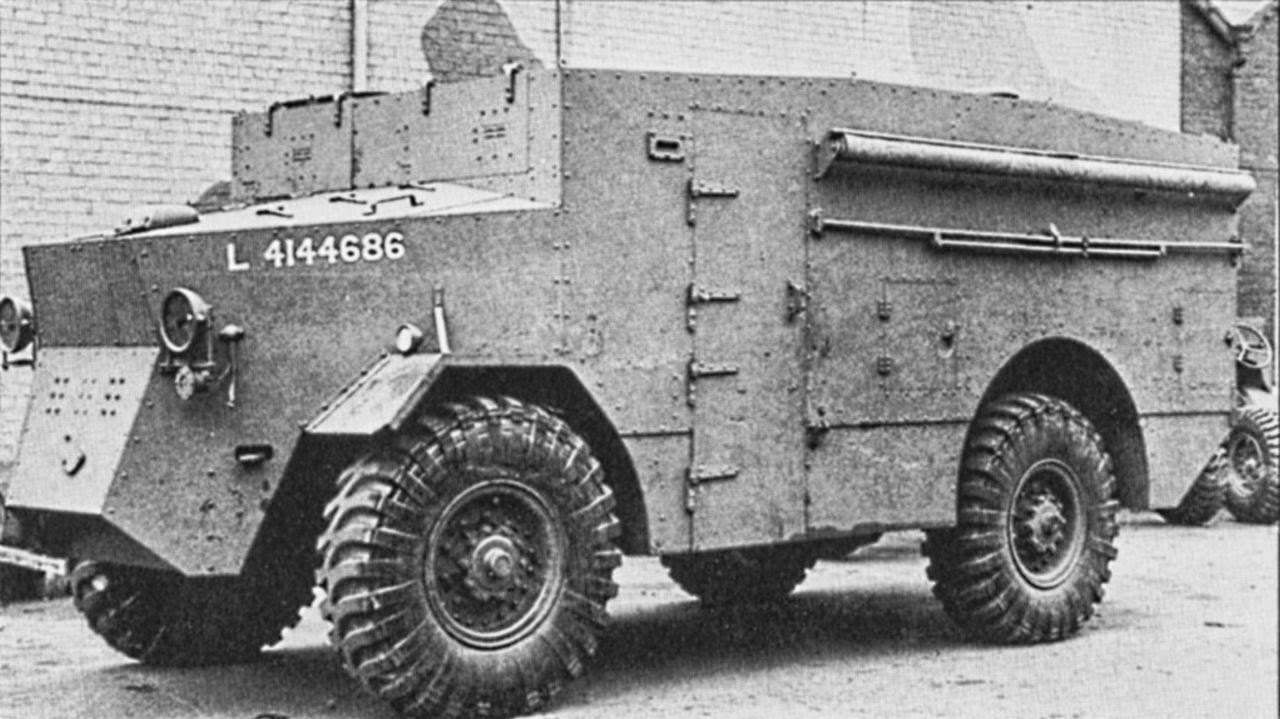
- Place of origin: United Kingdom

Service history
- Used by: British Army
- Wars: Second World War

Production history
- Manufacturer: Guy Motors
- Produced: 1940-1941
- No. built: 21

Specifications
- Engine: Gardner 5-cylinder diesel
- Drive: 4x4

The Guy Lizard Armoured Command Vehicle was a British command vehicle built during Second World War.

In May and June 1940, the Headquarters 1st Armoured Division with the British Expeditionary Force in France were mounted in mild steel prototype and wooden mock-up armoured command vehicles, but later in the year the first armoured steel armoured command vehicles were produced by Guy Motors on their Lizard 4x4 chassis. Twenty-one units were produced, and by early 1941 some were issued to the Headquarters, 7th Armoured Division in the North African Campaign as well as some formations within the United Kingdom. Guy was unable to continue production so a new design was prepared based on the AEC Matador, which became the AEC armoured command vehicle.
