= United States military vehicle markings of World War II =

Military markings on United States army vehicles were upgraded in August 1942 when specific new rules were adopted. New marks, from the national identification symbol downwards were ordered to be put on "all motor vehicles assigned to tactical units".

== History ==
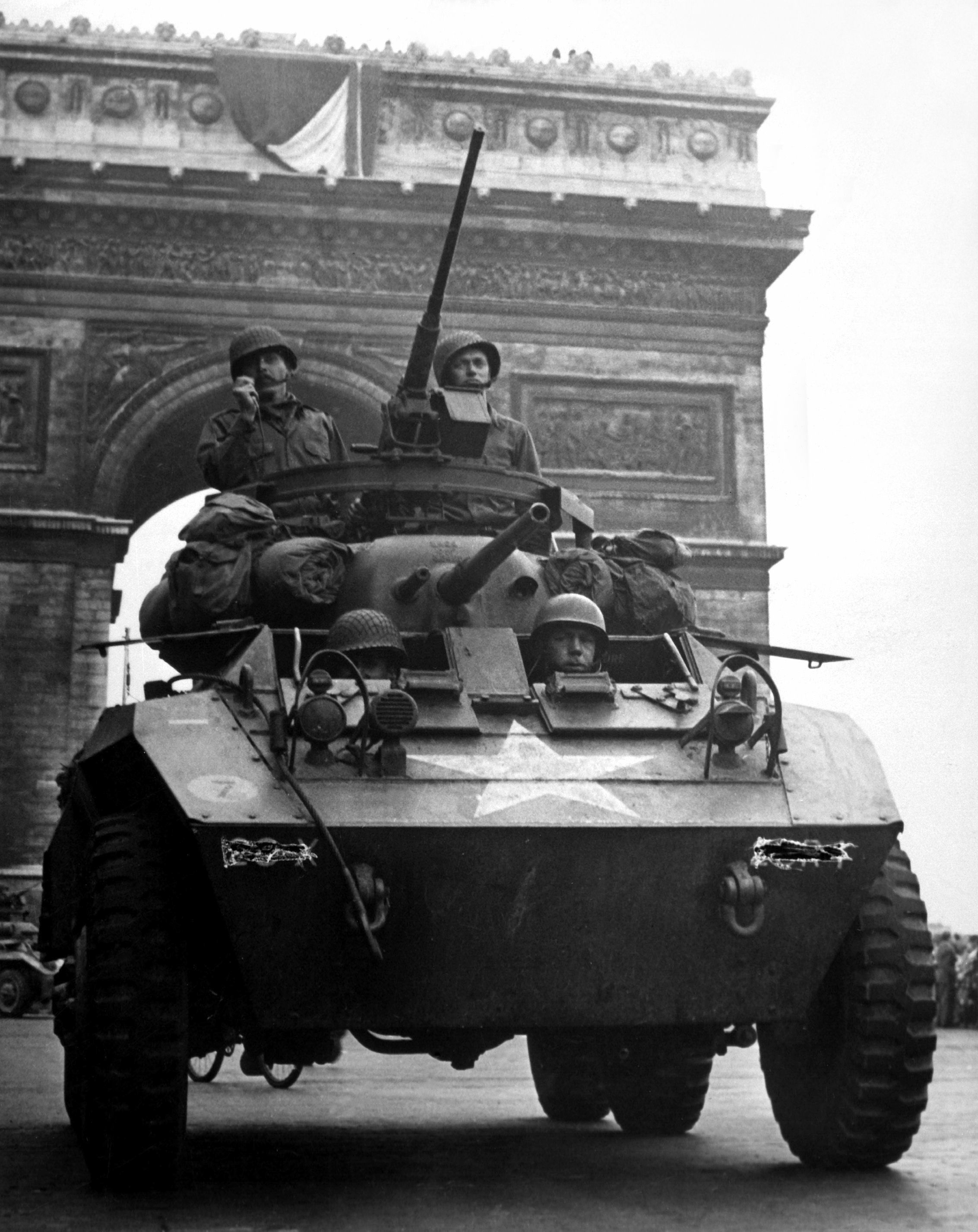
M8 Greyhound with bridge plate and white star visible. The formation signs close to the tow hooks have been censored. (Paris 1944)

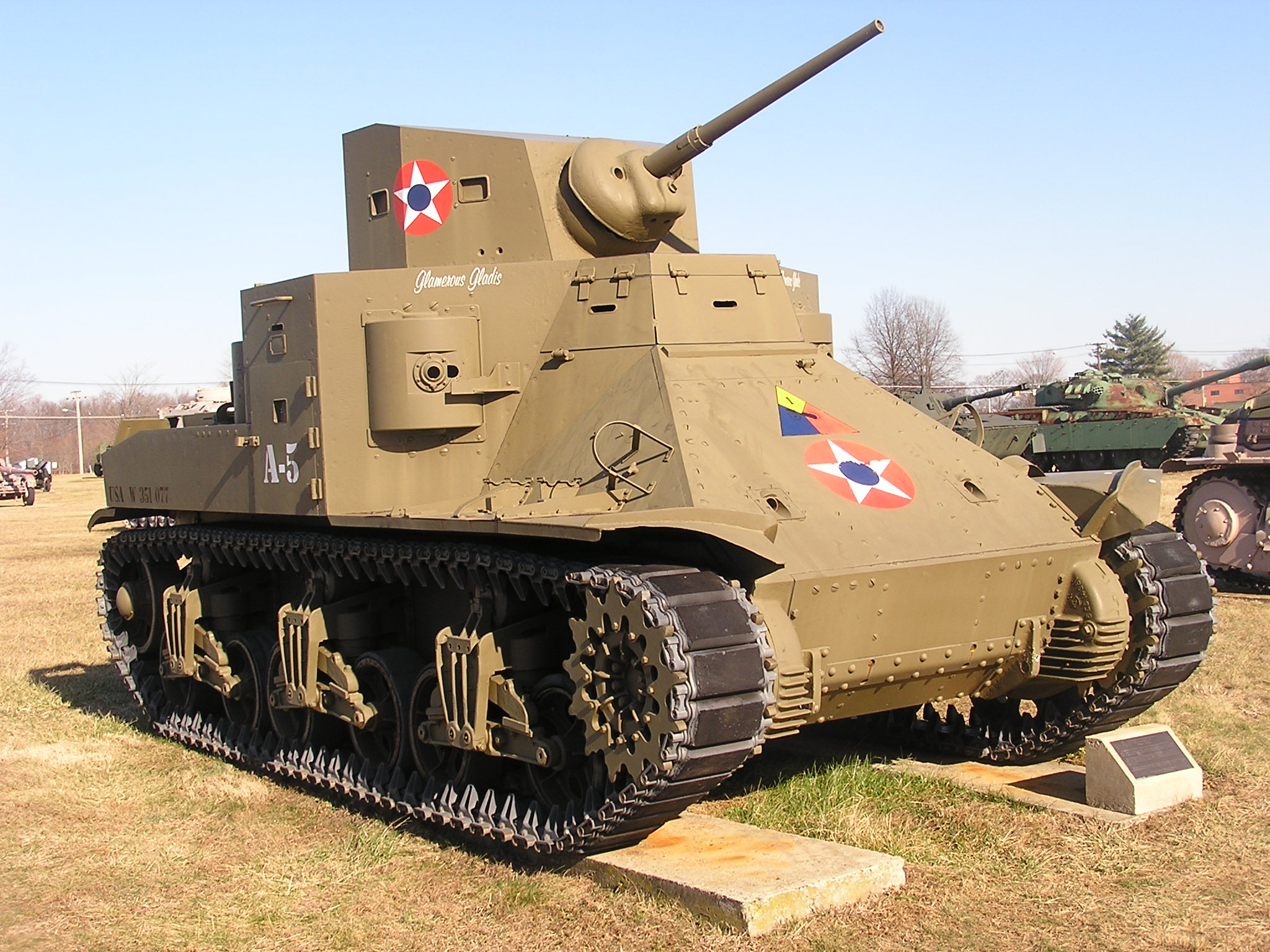
M2 Medium Tank with early markings

During World War I, the letters US or U.S. were used to identify vehicles of the American Expeditionary Forces. Formation signs and War Department vehicle identification numbers were painted on the sides. United States Army Ambulance Service vehicles carried a red cross and the Caduceus symbol which had been adopted by the U.S. Medical Department in 1902. War Department vehicle numbers were put on vehicles as was section identification signs, SSU meaning services support unit, with 2 or 3 digit number (e.g. SSU 525). Between the wars a standard vehicle serial number was introduced. An insignia USA W-????? (W for War Department) was used, the first or first two numbers indicating the vehicle type, the rest of the numbers being sequence numbers. All symbols were painted in white. A prefix K was used by the US Signal Corps on certain special vehicles.

== National identification ==
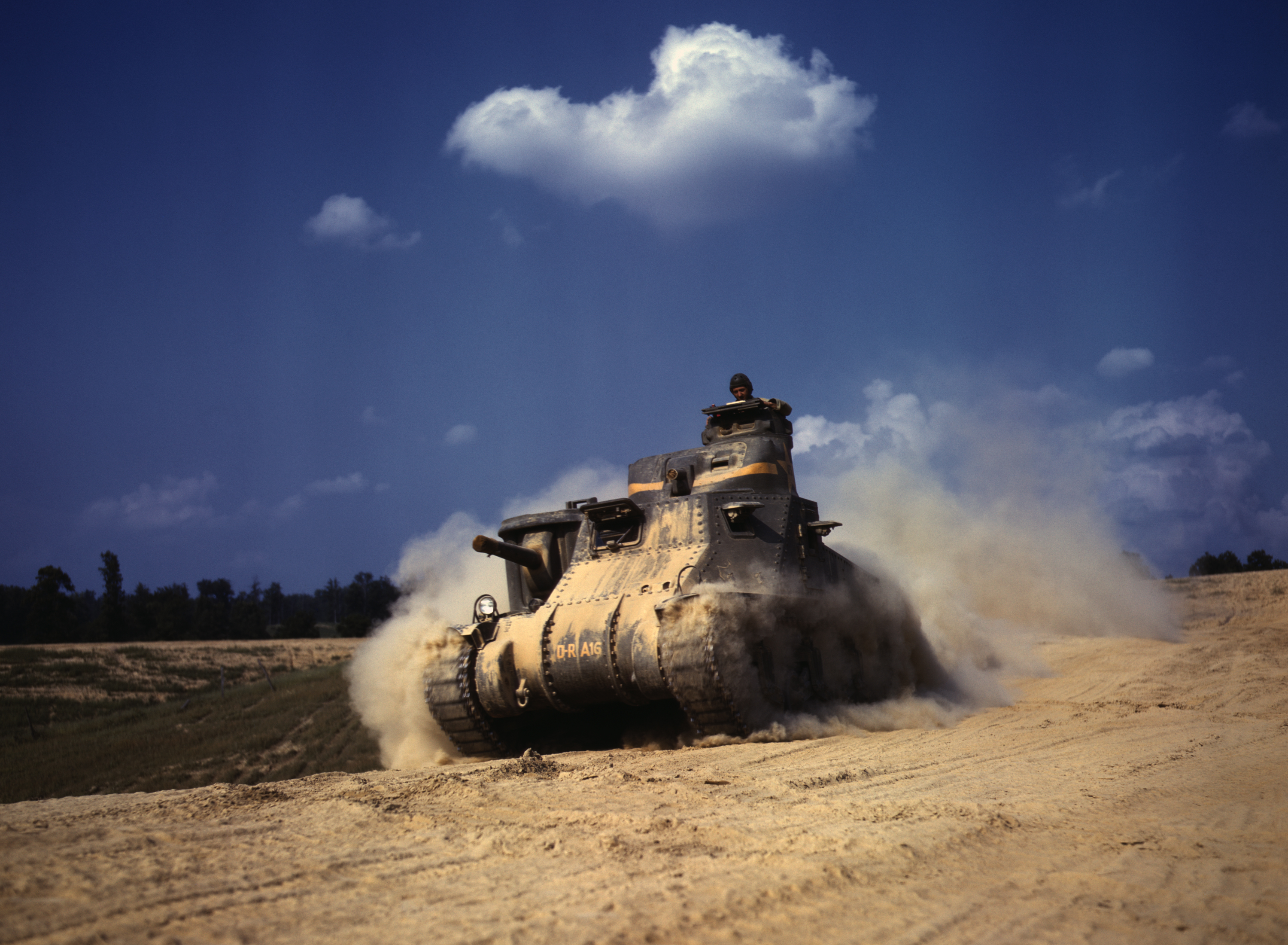
M3 medium tank (Lee) painted with yellow bar circling the turret with a star on each side.

- Three colored star, circle with blue background and white five pointed star with a red circle, that does not touch the blue background. Used pre-war and is identical to the marking on aircraft.
- Three colored star, as per two color star with a red circle, that does not touch the blue background.
- National flag, used predominately on vehicles in North African landing from November 1942 were painted in the sides of softskins bonnets and on the front and sides of armor.
- Two color star – circle with blue background and white five pointed star used in North Africa from late 1942.
- Star and stripe - bar, five pointed star and bar. Saw service in North Africa, Sicily and to a lesser extent, the SW Pacific. Used on tanks with the bar circling the turret with a star on each side. 22 inch diameter star. From January to August 1942 the star and bar was painted in air corps yellow.

Army regulation AR-850-5 issued August 1942 ordered a plain white five pointed star, as the national symbol, it was seen in all theatres from 1943 and by 1944 was the most common national identification sign. The star point was supposed to be facing rearwards on flat surfaces, upwards on a glacis.

In armored units, the white star was often painted out or a circle around the star was added, to avoid looking like a German cross at distance. 2nd Armored painted the vehicle number on the turret side in yellow for the same reason in Normandy, with the numbers being removed by D+14.

The August 1942 regulations authorised, when camouflage and concealment outweighed recognition requirements, the national insignia could be dulled, painted over with olive drab lacklustre gasoline solvent paint, or covered.

White star size and locations 1942-5 (in inches)
Vehicle	Bumper	Bonnet	Cab roof turret top	Cab doors	Sides	Rear	Other
Motorbike					6 (gas tank)		
Car	4 (c)		36 (from 1945)	20 (rear)		15	
Jeep	4 (c)	15 (1½ inches from dashboard)			6 (rear)	12 (l)	
Command car	4 (c)	15			15 (rear)	10 (c)	
Weapons carrier 1/2 ton	4 (c)	20 (25 from 1945)			10 (c)	10 (c)	
Weapons carrier 3/4 ton	6 (c)	25			10 (r)	10 (c)	
1 1/2 ton cargo truck	6 (c)	20 (open); 25 (closed)	36 (closed)	25	15 (open)	10 (c) tailboard 15 (l) mudguard	
2 1/2 ton cargo truck	6 (c)	32 (open)	32 (closed)	25	15 (open)	10 (c) tailboard 15 (l) mudguard	
4 ton cargo truck	6 (c)	25	32	25		10 (c) tailboard 15 (l) mudguard	
Scout car Half track		36			20	15 (c)	20 (c) radiator
Light tank			20 (turret)		20 (turret); 15 (hull from 1945)	10 (c)	
Medium tank			20 (turret ) 36 (engine deck of M3)		15 (turret); 15 (hull from 1945)	15 (turret)	
Additional regulations from 1945
M8 armored car			36 (engine deck)		15 (turret); 15 (hull)	15 (hull)	15 glacis
Priest SP gun					20	15 or 20 (l & r)	25 glacis
Grant tank			20 (turret); 36 (engine deck)			15 (hull)	25 glacis
Sherman tank			20 (turret); 60 (engine deck)				25 glacis
Tank destroyer			45 (engine deck)		20	20	36 glacis

note: (l) left, (c) centre (r) right

March 1944 Army Regulations gave permission for the national sign to be that chosen by the respective service command, allowing USMC and Army Air Forces to create their own.

== Formation signs ==
Formation signs on plates 6 inches high and 9 inches wide, located front right and rear left, were standard until the end of 1941 when they were limited to staff cars and Jeeps in the Army. Most in the form of a shield and ribbon with a motto.

Army Regulation AR-850-5 issued August 1942 set out a standard bumper code which came in four groupings.

Group 1

Smallest appropriate unit
Unit	Number	Letter
Infantry Division	Arabic numeral	
Armored Division	Arabic numeral	Δ (3 inches high with ¼-inch stroke)
Cavalry Division	Arabic numeral	C
Airborne Division	Arabic numeral	AB or A/B
Army Corps	Roman numeral	
Armored Corps	Roman numeral	Δ
Cavalry Corps	Roman numeral	C
Airborne Corps	Roman numeral	AB or A/B
Army	Arabic numeral	A
Air force	Arabic numeral	star (3 inches high)
Zone of communications	ZC	
Army Ground Forces	AGF	
Services of Supply	SOS	
General Headquarters	GHQ	
Zone of interior	ZI	
Reception center	RC	
Replacement training center	A or C or Δ or Star	RTC
Training center	TC	
Firing center	FC	
Peninsular Base Section	PBS	
Other units	Use non conflicting letters	

Group 2

Separate unit identifier 1942–1945
Branch or service	Letter	Notes
Airborne	AB	
Amphibious	AM	APH from 1945
Anti-Aircraft Artillery	AA	
Armored	Δ	
Army Air Force	Star	wings and propeller from 1945
Cavalry	C	
Chemical warfare	G	
Coast Artillery	CA	
Corps of Engineers	E	
Field Artillery	FA	F from 1945
Infantry	I	preceded by ½ inch dash
Medical	M	
Military Police	P	
Mountain		MN from 1945
Ordnance	O	preceded by ½ inch dash
Quartermaster	Q	
Signal Corps	S	
Tank Destroyer	TD	
Tank Group	TG	not used from 1945

The dash in front of I and O is to avoid confusion with numbers

Group 3

Company codes 1942–1945
Company	Code	Notes
Headquarters	HQ	
Lettered Company	Lettered designation	
Anti tank	AT	
Ammunition		AM from 1945
Cannon	CN	
Depot		DP from 1945
Heavy Weapons	HW	
Maintenance	MT	
Mortar		MR from 1945
Reconnaissance	R	
Rocket		RT from 1945
Service	SV	
Train	TN	
Weapons	W	
Other	non conflicting letters	

Independent company codes from October 1942
Code	Branch or Service
AW	Automatic weapons
Con	Construction
DP	Depot
DS	Direct Support
GAM	General Auto
GS	General Support
HW	Heavy Weapons
MR	Mortar
MT	Maintenance
PM	Parachute maintenance
R	Reconnaissance
RP	Repair
TMP	Transportation motor pool
X	Separate Company

Unusual service units could invent their own 1-3 letter code.

Group 4 serial number of the vehicle

The Serial number of the vehicle in normal order of march. Vehicles assigned to headquarters will be grouped with HQ vehicles and given small serial numbers. It was normal to adopt a convoy order number in a logical format, HQ vehicles would be numbered 1-10, 1st platoon 11-20, 2nd platoon 21-30 etc.

Stencilled in white, max 4 inches high, front and back of the vehicle, groupings were separated by a one-inch dash. Groups three and four may be on the opposite end of the bumper. If put into two lines, Group 1 was over Group 2, and Group 3 over Group 4. A trailer would carry the same bumper number of its towing vehicle.

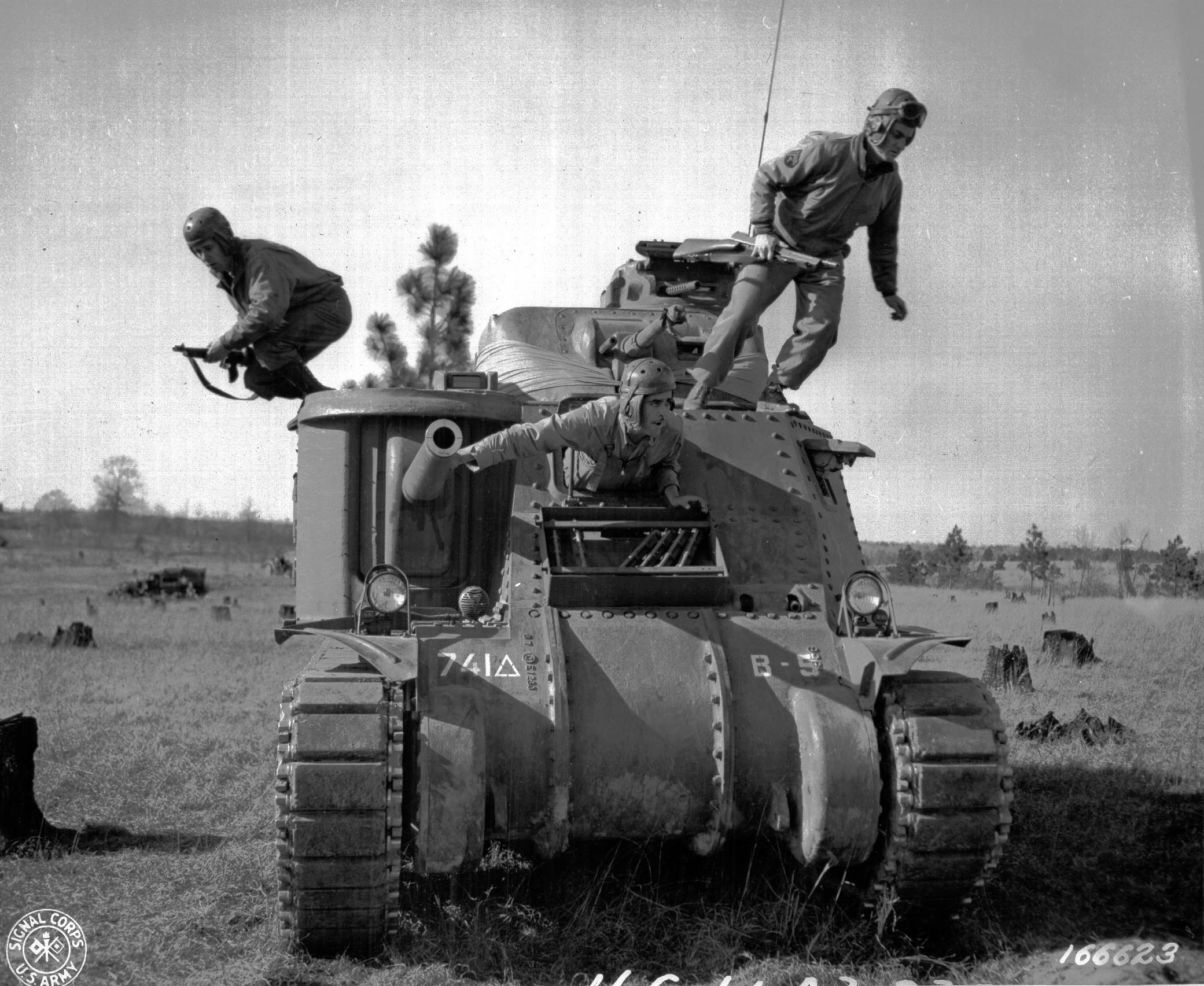
M3 medium tank (Lee)

Examples of bumper numbers
Group 1	Group 2	Group 3	Group 4	Note
101AB	506PIR	F	4	101 Airborne, 506 Parachute Infantry, 4th vehicle of Company F
2Δ	17Δ	C	7	2nd Armored Division, 17th Armored, 7th vehicle of Company C
8I	34-I	B	23	8th Infantry Division, 34th Infantry, 3rd vehicle of 2nd platoon of company B
VIII	704TD	HQ	6	8 Corps, 704 Tank Destroyer Battalion, 6th vehicle of HQ
1C	61F	A	10	1st Cavalry Division, 61st Field artillery, Battery A vehicle 10

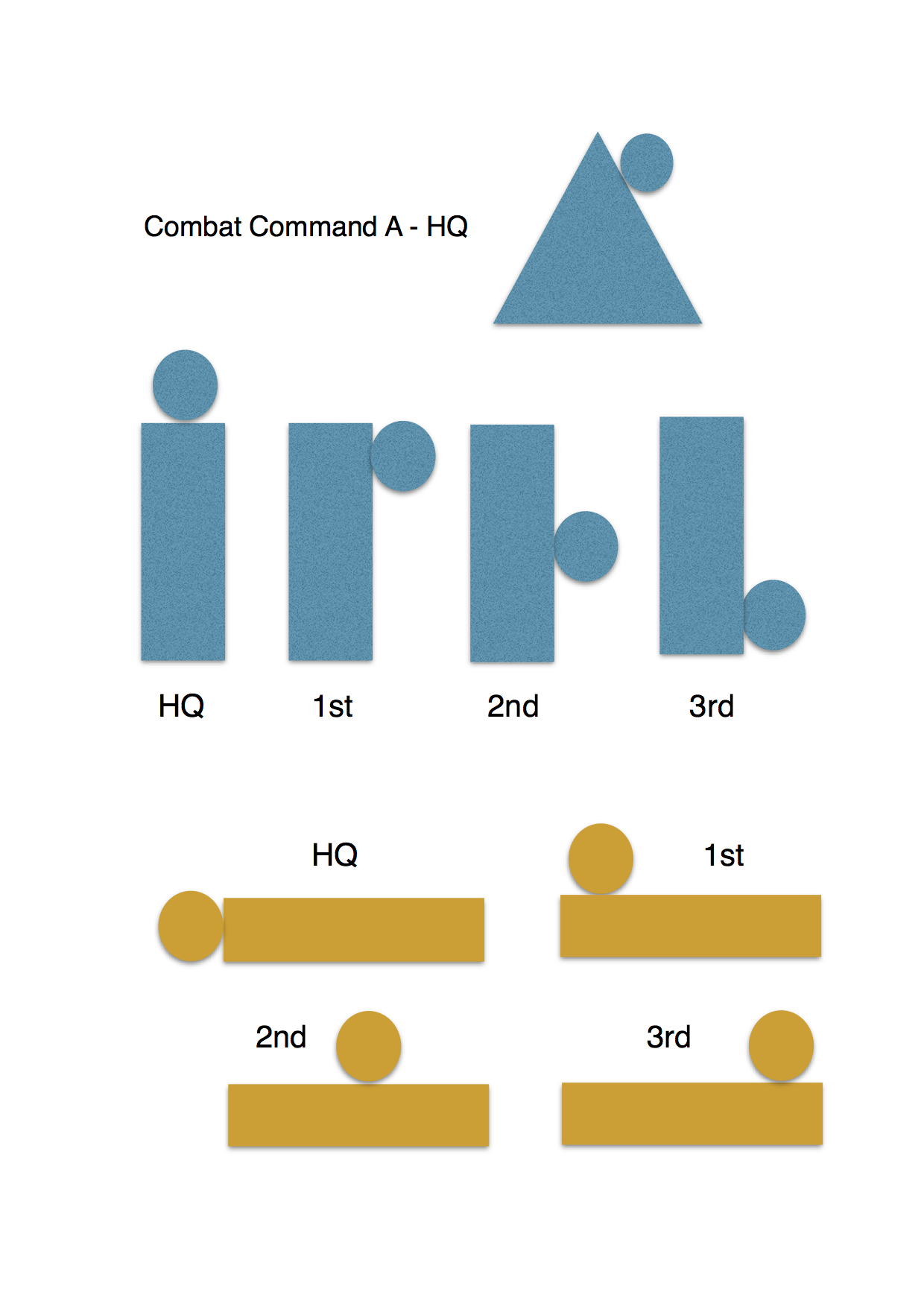
Style of 1st Armored Regt. 1st Armored Div in Tunisia tac signs

=== Tactical signs ===
The August 1942 regulations set out the rules surrounding tactical markings:

Divisions, independent brigades, combat commands and combat teams may prescribe tactical markings for their command. Painted on the vehicles they may be in color, their location, size and design using geometric shapes to be specified. To be changed in a combat zone when appropriate with no written record of the system.

Painted on turrets or hull sides of Armored Fighting Vehicles (AFV), on bumpers of halftracks and softskins.

They included:

- One digit numbers in 1st Armored Division in North Africa painted in black alongside the tactical sign.
- One or two letters and one or two numbers such as B-18 or DT-7, as large as possible.
- Triangles, oblongs and circles in various combinations and formats designed to identify vehicles down to platoon level.

==== Names on vehicles ====
Vehicle names were authorised and used on AFV's as a form of tactical sign, often using names starting with the same letter to designate vehicles of the same platoon or company.

Battles, places, people and girls names were common.

== Non formation signs ==
=== War department number ===
The 1929 system of unique war department number was allocated by the Army Quartermaster Corps. Until mid 1944 a prefix of W- for War Dept. was used. Australian produced vehicles for US use in the Pacific theatre had a prefix of U. A K- prefix indicated a U.S. Signal Corps designation.

From January 1944, a vehicle where the engine was suppressed to reduce radio interference had an S painted after the number either side of the bonnet.

Prefix numbers indicated the type of vehicle.

War Department number prefix
Letter	Vehicle type	Location
0	Trailers	centre of back
00	Maintenance trucks	hood both sides, tailgate
1	Cars	under hood on right side, upper part and registration plates (until 1942) outer surface of hood on each side and rear panel (1942 to 1945)
10	Kitchen trailers	centre of back
2	Utility truck ¾ ton to 1 ton (incl. Jeep) (until 1942); Light truck up to 1 ton (incl. Jeep) (from 1943)	hood both sides, tailgate †
20	Reconnaissance trucks and Buses	hood both sides, tailgate
3	Light truck 1¼ to 2 ton (until 1942); Medium trucks up to 1½ tons (from 1943)	hood both sides, tailgate †
30	Tanks and some special vehicles	both sides near front and rear
4	Medium truck 2½ to 4 ton (until 1942); Trucks of 2½ to 5 ton (from 1943)	hood both sides, tailgate †
40	Tracked and half tracked vehicles (except tanks)	both sides near front and rear
5	Heavy truck 5 ton or over (until 1942); Trucks over 5 ton and prime movers (from 1943)	hood both sides, tailgate †
50	Fire and crash trucks	hood both sides, tailgate †
6	Motor cycles and motorcycle combinations	rear registration plate
60	Armored cars and special command vehicles (including searchlight, radio and command)	both sides near front and rear
7	Ambulance	hood both sides, rear door
70	Amphibious	both sides near front and rear
8	Wheeled tractors	hood both sides, tailgate †
80	Tankers	hood both sides, tailgate †
9	Full and half tracked tractors	hood both sides, tailgate †

† For trucks without hoods, numbers to be painted on each end of drivers seat.

The first 99,999 jeeps had five digit numbers after the prefix, thereafter six digit numbers.

Army vehicle numbers were preceded by USA or US ARMY, normally appearing on a line above the number in same color and size as the number. If there was room, it could all appear in one line. For Marine Corps vehicles, substitute USMC. The 1942 regulations (AR-850-5) required U.S.A. over the 5 or 6 digit number.

The 22 April 1942 regulation also specified that the numbers were to be painted using a stencil in blue drab lustreless enamel with numbers one inch high on motorcycles, two inches on trailers and US registration plates and four inches high and two inches wide on all other vehicles.

The 22 April 1942 regulation on color were amended and from 1943 the numbers were prescribed to be painted white, as blue drab was too hard to see.

The 1945 regulations specified white lacklustre, stencilling, enamel paint with numbers on both sides of the hood close to the vertical surface so the number can be read from the side and on the rear of the vehicle, where space permits with heights of letters varying from 1 inch to 4 inch, with the largest size practical to be used.

=== Aerial recognition symbols ===
The official aerial recognition would become the plain white five pointed star on a horizontal surface or glacis that was used for national identification.

During 1942-3 a thick white band appeared around turrets of AFV's in North Africa, the Pacific and in the UK.

White five pointed star with a circle around, often broken at the points, per the stencil, was in common use by July 1943 in horizontal surfaces, except in the Pacific theatre.

Vehicles landing in Sicily were ordered to change the aerial recognition by painting a yellow circle around the white star, sometimes the circle was thickened and the star size reduced.

=== Bridge plates ===
All vehicles had a bridge rating, the US regulations in 1942 and 1943 did not specify a system. In practice the British system was adopted. The rating was displayed on a yellow circle, with black writing. The circle was for most vehicles on an attached plate, 6 inches to 9 inches diameter. Tanks and many other AFV's had the marking painted on their hull. The location is on the front, often attached to the right fender, sometimes attached to radiators.

The number equated to the bridge category, very roughly based on weight with adjustments for axel loading and impact factors, rounded up. Where the vehicle normally has a trailer, the writing showed two numbers, the upper being the loaded vehicle with the loaded trailer, the lower just the loaded vehicle.

Bridge classification
Class	Vehicle
1	Jeep trailer, motorbike
2	Jeep, reconnaissance truck, trailer
4	Light truck, ¾ ton ambulance
5	1½ ton truck
7	M8 armored car
10	2½ to 5 ton truck, M3 half track
15	Stuart tank
16	Hellcat tank destroyer
21	Trucks over 5 ton
30	Sherman tank
34	Pershing tank

A Jeep, if it had a trailer, would have 3/2. Jeeps and motorbikes did not have bridge plates, they fell into categories 1 or 2.

In the field, the bright yellow sign facing forward was considered too visible so was often toned down, repainted as a yellow hollow circle or discarded.

In February 1945 US regulations specified the US system to be black numbers on a yellow eight inch square, or 8x6 rectangular plate fastened to right of centre front bumper. AFV's on front level with top of tracks, half tracks and scout cars on right fender. Amphibious right front. Numbers used the same system for towing vehicles on tractor plus tow over tractor rating. It does not appear that in Europe this was adopted before the end of the war there.

== Other markings ==
=== Regimental insignia ===
Regimental crests were common between the wars and continued until 1941, still appearing in 1943 and 1944 amongst artillery, cavalry and independent companies. These unofficial colored signs were placed on the sides of vehicles.

=== Rank ===
Vehicles of General Officers carried a plate 6 inches high by 9 inches wide on the front right and left rear bumpers, painted red and bearing up to five white five pointed stars. Covered up or removed when vehicle was not carrying the general. Flags were an alternate, flown on right front wing of cars.

=== Left hand drive ===
US Army vehicles sent to the UK had:

- CAUTION over LEFT HAND over DRIVE or
- LEFT HAND over DRIVE over NO HAND SIGNALS

The letters were two or three inches high on the rear. These signs were normally retained when the vehicle was shipped to Europe.

=== Speed limit ===
A sign MAX SPEED and the number in one inch letters was stencilled on the front dash board, using the same paint as the vehicle serial number.

=== Shipping and rail loading marks ===
Shipping stencils applied before shipping from the USA. Up to five lines giving length and width in inches, shipping and combat weight in pounds and any other relevant information. In one or two inch white letters on the olive drab paint or sometimes on a mat black panel.

=== Tire pressure ===
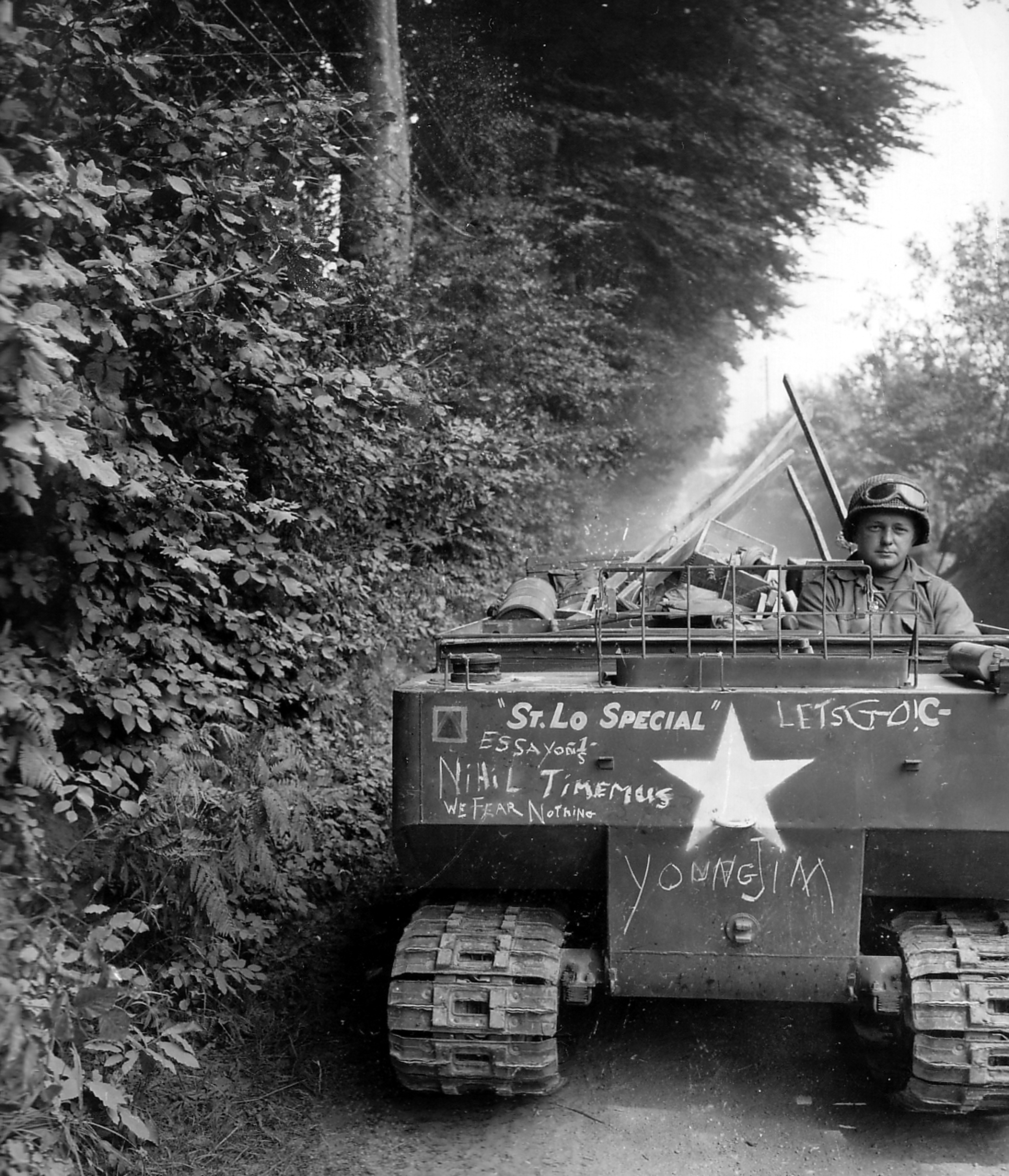
M29 Weasel with personalized slogans

A stencil print with T.P. and the number (35 for Jeeps) was either put on the inside on the dashboard or inside the wheel well.

=== Anti-freeze ===
When anti-freeze was put in a radiator PRESTONE with a year was stencilled on the hood above the radiator grill, 43 indicating winter 43/44. ½ to 1 inch letters in white.

=== No smoking ===
Signs with NO SMOKING were put on vehicles transporting inflammable liquids

=== Convoy markings ===
A visibility patch comprising three vertical white stripes and four alternate black stripes was often painted on a rear fender to aid station keeping.

=== Personalised markings ===
Personalised slogans, words, names and pictures of pin up girls and Disney characters were discouraged but evident on many vehicles in wartime photos. February 1945 regulations stated that "caricatures, cartoons, coats of arms and symbolic figures are not authorised."

== Specialist vehicles ==
=== Ambulance ===
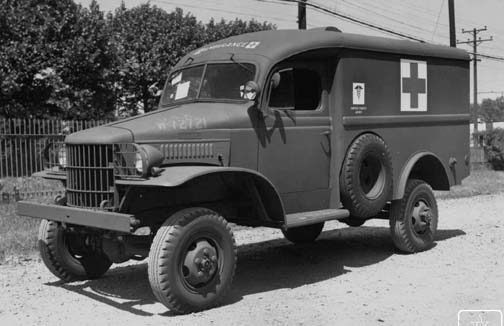
Dodge WC9 Ambulance

Caduceus

The 1942 regulations specified Geneva cross, bright red on a snow-white field. Cross to be eighteen inches and each limb to be a six-inch square, in centre of side of body. On the roof the red cross on a white background to reach both sides. Above the visor, white letters AMBULANCE with a small red cross on white background either side, it can be on windscreen but not to interfere with drivers visibility. On each rear door, below the window, a six-inch cross on an eight-inch white field. All writing in white to be properly shaded to give depth.

A six-inch caduceus in maroon to be painted on both sides of the rear body, below the lower moulding, seven inches to the rear of the front body. Under which in one inch letters UNITED STATES over ARMY. All paints to be lustreless enamel.

=== Dangerous cargoes ===
Vehicles carrying explosives displayed the word EXPLOSIVES in three inch white letters on a red placard at the front, rear and on both sides. Bumpers were painted red.

Fuel tankers refuelling aircraft in 1945 were painted chrome yellow, and had black letters. Army olive-drab tankers had white letters. Signs displayed were OCTAINE GASOLINE and NO SMOKING WITHIN 50 FEET.

=== Military Police ===
All Jeeps used by Military Police had MILITARY POLICE in three inch black letters around the circumference of a sixteen-inch white disc that was in the centre of the spare wheel at the rear. A similar sign was also painted below the windscreen. On motorcycles MILITARY POLICE appeared in white or black on the canvas part of the windshield in white, or in black on a white band.

=== Animal drawn ===
1942 regulations stated that vehicles drawn by animals, including canvas cover vehicles to be marked U.S.A. using a stencil in lacklustre blue paint, generally on both sides and tailgate. Veterinary ambulances carry a green cross.

== See also ==
- British military vehicle markings of World War II
