= S1 scout car =

WWII Australian-made American armoured car

Scout Car S1
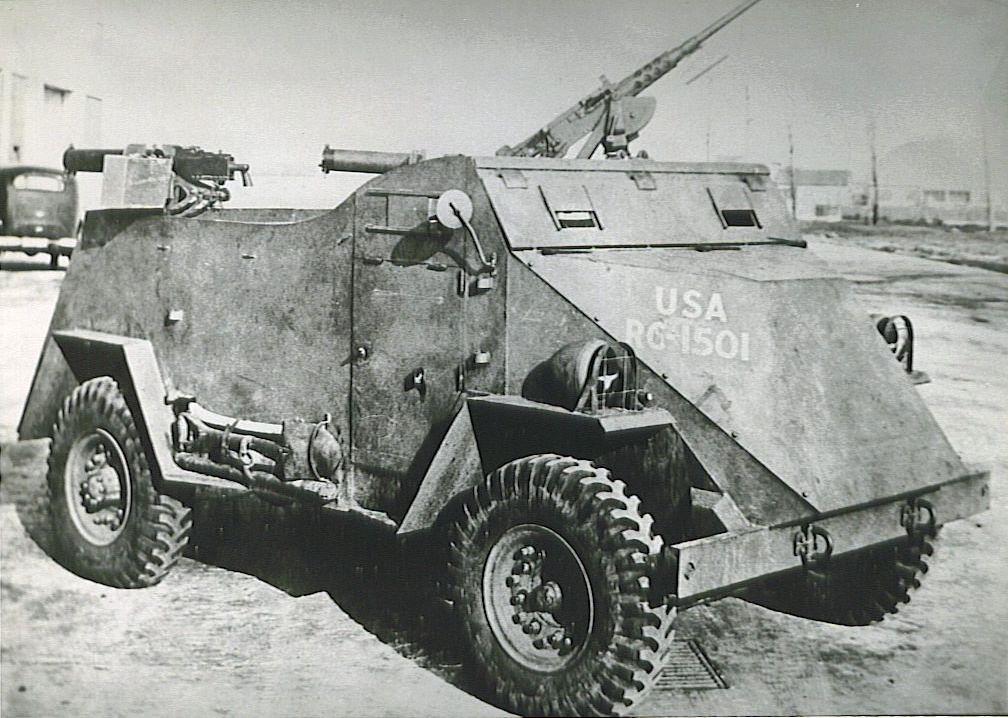
- Scout Car S1 (American)
- Place of origin: Australia

Service history
- Used by: United States
- Wars: World War II

Production history
- Designed: 1942
- Manufacturer: Ford Australia
- No. built: 46

Specifications
- Mass: 4 tonnes
- Length: 4.4 m (14 ft 5 in)
- Width: 1.9 m (6 ft 3 in)
- Height: 1.8 m (5 ft 11 in)
- Crew: 5 (commander, driver, 3 gunners)
- Armor: 6 mm
- Main armament: 1x 0.5 inch (12.7 mm) Browning M2HB machine gun
- Secondary armament: 2x .30 inch (7.62 mm) Browning M1917A1 machine guns
- Engine: Ford V8 sidevalve 95 hp (71 kW)
- Power/weight: 23.7 hp/tonne
- Suspension: 4x2 (single 4x4 example), leaf spring

Scout Car S1 (American) is an armoured car produced by Ford Australia for local use by the United States Army during World War II.

== History and description ==
In 1942, the United States Army Air Forces (USAAF) in Australia issued a requirement for a light armoured car to be used in patrolling and airfield defence. The requirement resulted in a vehicle designated Scout Car S1 (American). About 40 vehicles were produced by Ford Australia.

The vehicle was based on a Ford Canadian Military Pattern F15 (Note: "15" referring to the 15 hundredweight load capacity) 4x2 chassis (a single 4x4 vehicle was built). The open-topped armoured hull was similar to that of the M3 Scout Car. The armament consisted of one .50 inch (12.7 mm) heavy machine gun and two .30 inch machine guns on skate rails, operated by the crew of five.

They served in defence of Australia and did not see any combat.

== Survivors ==
As of late 2017, two S1 cars are known to be preserved: one restored at the Australian Armour and Artillery Museum in Cairns, and another in a private collection. (Note: As posted in Facebook on 10 Nov 2017 by the Australian Armour and Artillery Museum.)
