= AEC armoured command vehicle =

British armoured command vehicle

AEC 4x4 ACV
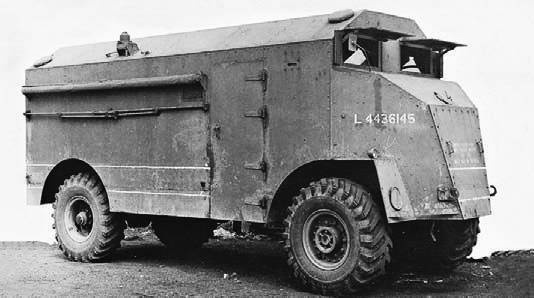
- AEC command car
- Type: Armoured command vehicle

Service history
- Used by: British Army; Pakistan Army
- Wars: Second World War

Production history
- Manufacturer: Associated Equipment Company; Birtley Ordnance Factory; Weymann Motor Bodies
- Unit cost: £1,576
- Produced: 1941–1948
- No. built: 415
- Variants: Low Power, High Power, AEC 6x6 ACV

Specifications
- Mass: 12.2 t
- Length: 20 ft 0 in (6.10 m)
- Width: 7 ft 9 in (2.36 m)
- Height: 9 ft 6 in (2.90 m)
- Crew: 7-8 (3 officers, 3 radio operators, 2 drivers)
- Armour: 10–12 mm (0.39–0.47 in)
- Main armament: 1 x .303 inch Bren light machine gun, carried inside
- Engine: AEC 187 6-cylinder diesel engine 95 hp (71 kW)
- Power/weight: 7.8 hp/tonne
- Suspension: wheeled 4x4
- Operational range: 280 mi (450 km)
- Maximum speed: 37 mph (60 km/h)

AEC armoured command vehicles (ACVs) were a series of command vehicles built by the British Associated Equipment Company (AEC) during the Second World War.

== History ==
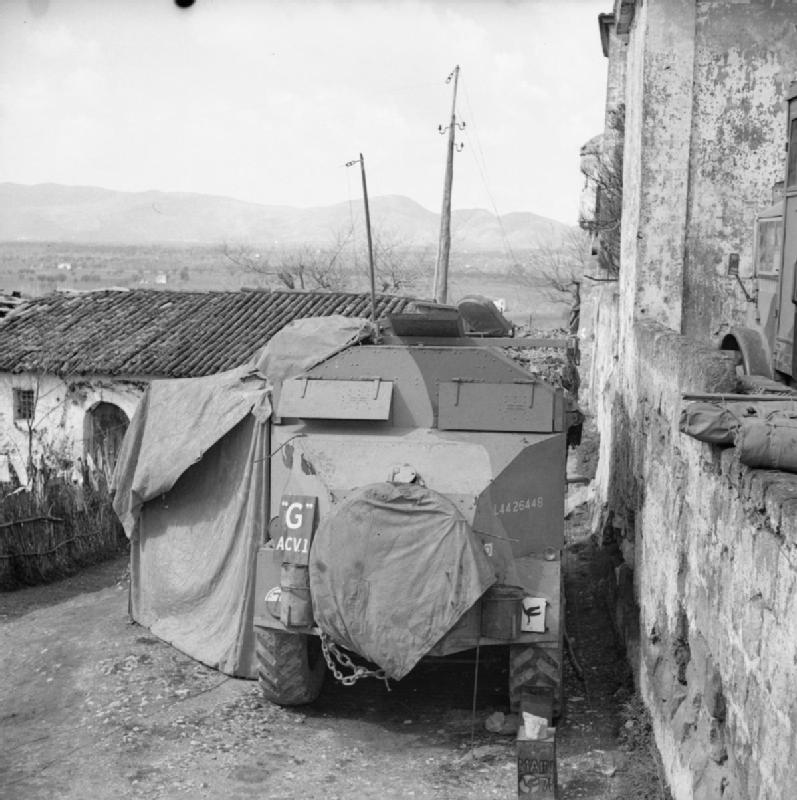
An ACV of the 23rd Infantry Brigade HQ at Francolise, 14 March 1944

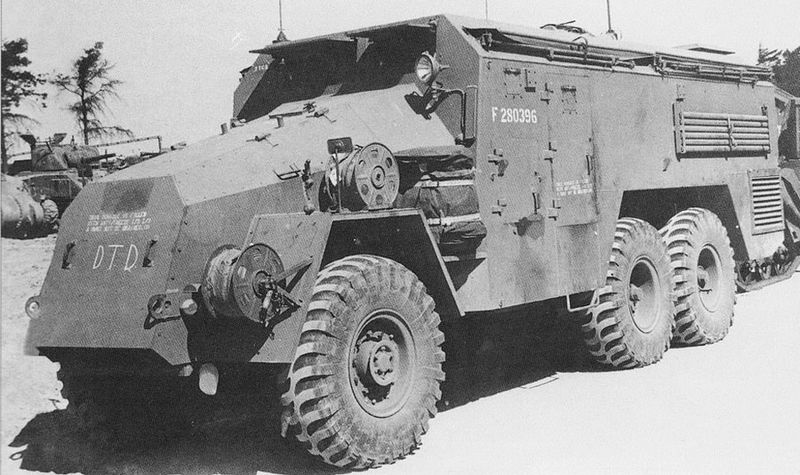
AEC 6x6 ACV

During the Second World War, the United Kingdom was the only country to develop and widely employ purpose-built armoured command vehicles. Those were essentially armoured buses based on truck chassis.

The most common ACV of the British Army was the AEC 4x4 ACV. The vehicle, based on AEC Matador chassis, entered production in 1941. A total of about 415 units were built. The vehicle was used for the first time in the North African Campaign and remained in service until the end of the war. Big and comfortable, it was nicknamed "Dorchester" by the troops, after the luxury hotel in London. Two of these ACVs, nicknamed Romeo and Juliet, were brought to Risalpur from Burma by the 254th Indian Tank Brigade at the end of the war and remained in service with the Pakistan Army until 1963.

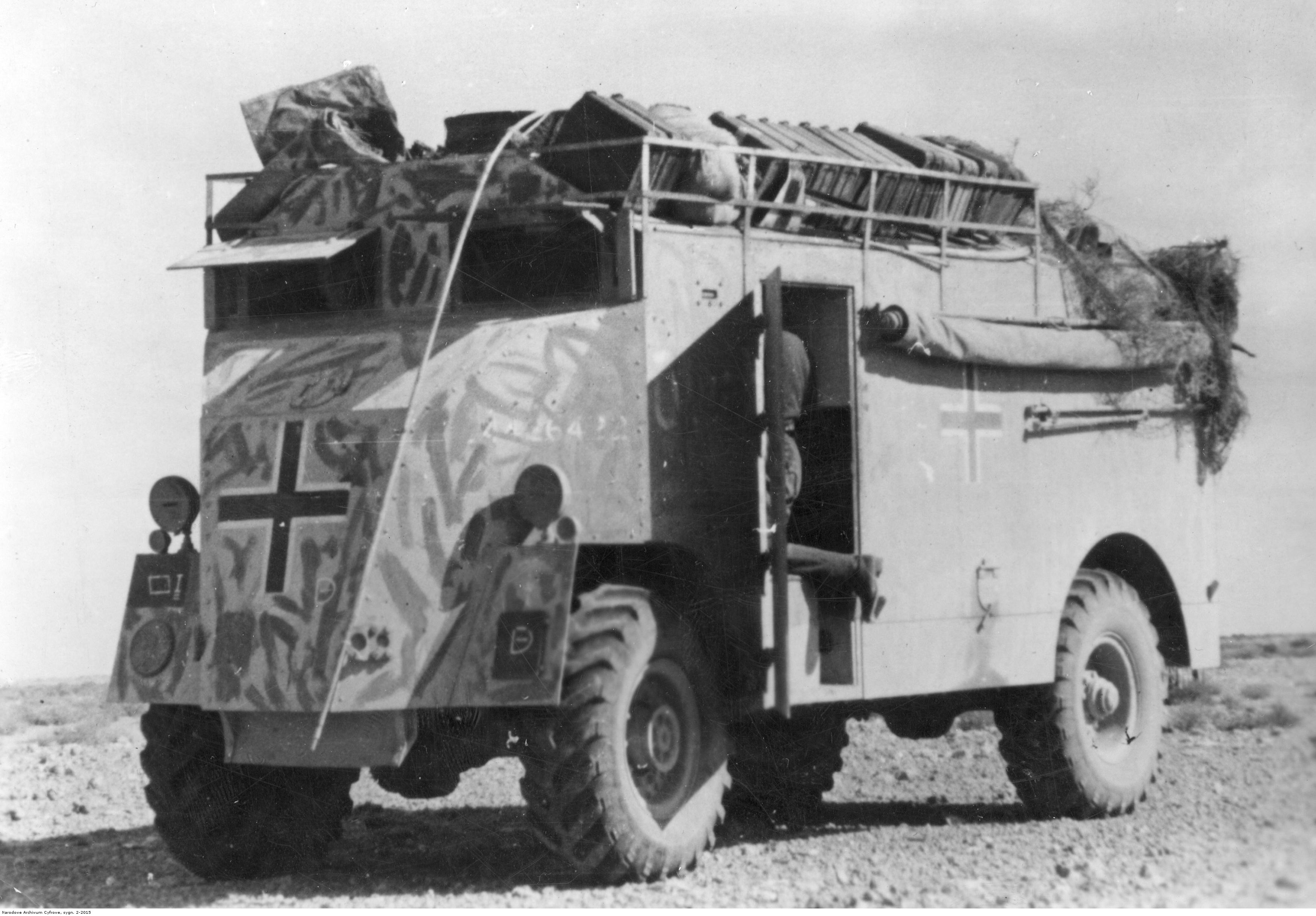
Captured AEC ACV used by Erwin Rommel in the North African campaign

Three ACVs of this type were captured by the German Afrika Korps. Two of them, named "Max" and "Moritz", were employed by Rommel and his staff throughout the campaign.

In 1944 a larger AEC 6x6 ACV was developed. The vehicle was based on the AEC 0857 lorry chassis and was powered by the AEC 198 150 hp engine. The hull was welded from 9 mm thick rolled steel. The weight of the vehicle reached 17 tons. One hundred and fifty one units were built.

Both vehicles were built in two configurations, called LP (low power) and HP (high power), with different radio equipment.

Some ACVs were conversions of armoured demolition vehicles that used the same bodywork.

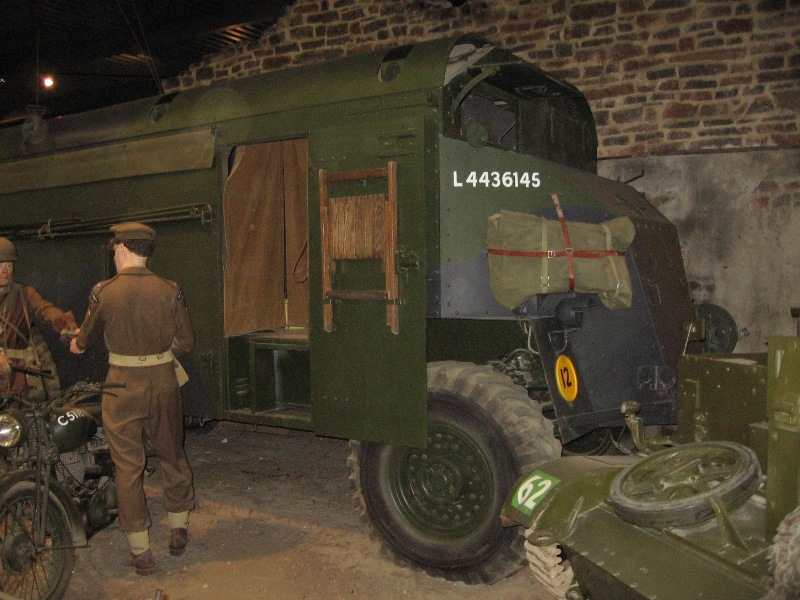
An AEC Dorchester at IWM

== Variants ==
High power
One No. 19 wireless set, one R 107 high-frequency reception set. The No. 19 set had a maximum output of 30 watts and maximum range of 45 miles (72 km).
Low-power body
Two No. 19 wireless sets. No. 19 set with a maximum output of 30 watts and maximum range of 45 miles (72 km) for communications with higher commands.

== See also ==
- Guy Lizard
