= AEC Matador =

Motor vehicle

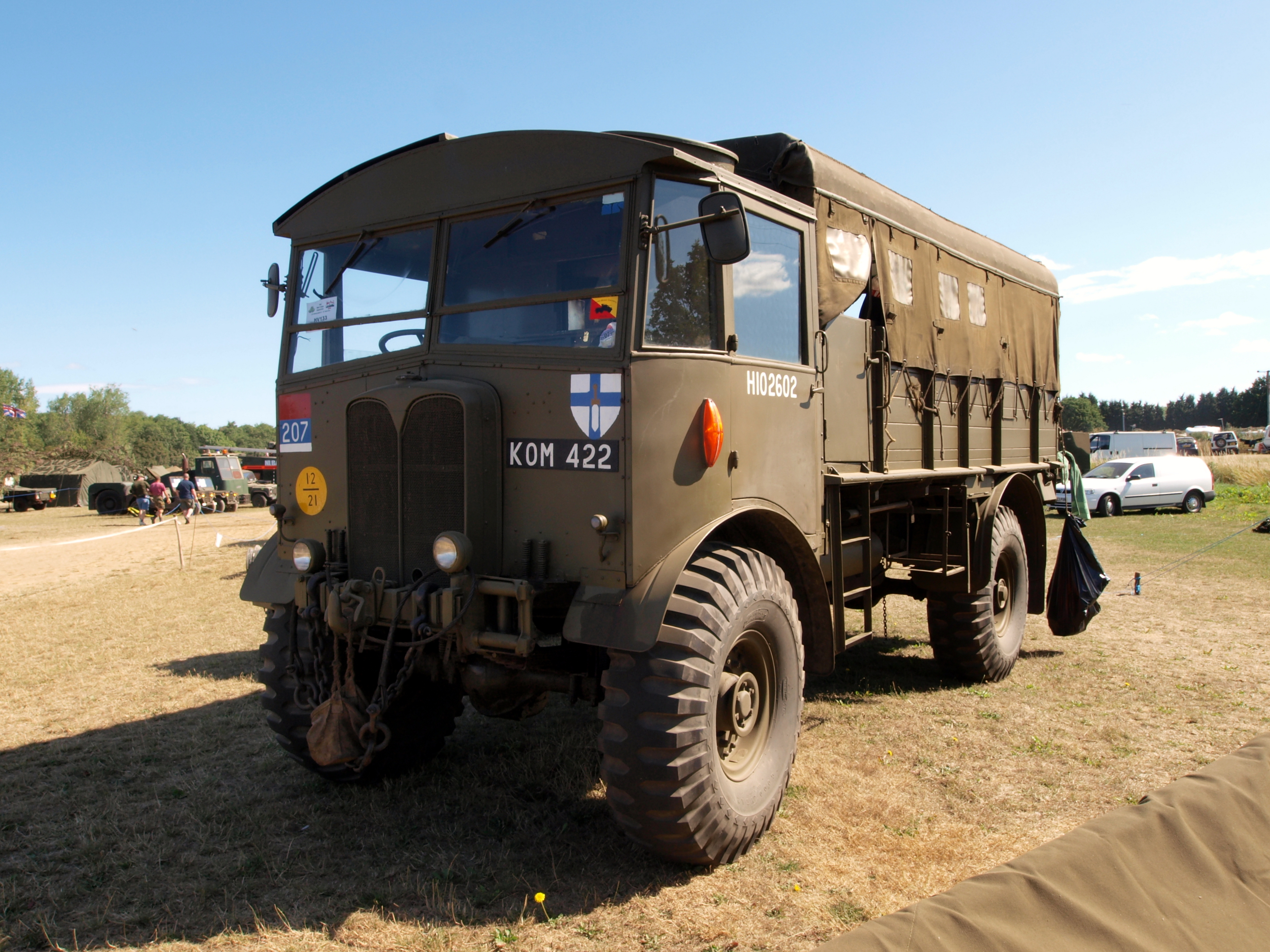
- AEC Matador, H102602
- Place of origin: United Kingdom

Production history
- Manufacturer: AEC
- Produced: 1938–1945, 1953–1958
- No. built: 10,411
- Variants: Tractor, 4x4, heavy anti-aircraft; Tractor, 4x4, medium artillery; Truck, 4x4, 5 ton, flat platform; Truck, 4x4, 5 ton, GS cargo; Truck, 4x4, 5 ton, mobile air traffic control; Truck, 4x4, 5 ton, signals

Specifications
- Mass: Unladen 7.15 long tons (7.26 t); Fully loaded 10.85 long tons (11.02 t)
- Length: 20 ft 9 in (6.32 m); 12 ft 7 in (3.84 m) wheelbase
- Width: 7 ft 10 in (2.39 m)
- Height: 10 ft 2 in (3.10 m)
- Engine: AEC A173 diesel; 463 cu in (7.59 L) six-cylinder; 95 bhp (71 kW); AEC A187 diesel; 463 cu in (7.59 L) six-cylinder; 105 bhp (78 kW); AEC A193 petrol; 452 cu in (7.41 L) six-cylinder; 92 bhp (69 kW)
- Drive: 4x4
- Transmission: 4F1R
- Suspension: Front & rear live axles on semi-elliptical multi-leaf springs
- Maximum speed: 36 mph (58 km/h)
- References: The AEC military vehicles

The AEC Matador was a heavy 4×4 truck and medium artillery tractor built by the Associated Equipment Company for British and Commonwealth forces during World War II. AEC had already built a 4×2 lorry, also known as the Matador (all AEC lorries received 'M' names) in 1931.

== Description ==
The Matador was distinctive with its flat fronted cab with gently curved roof, wheels at the corners and a flat load carrying area covered by a canvas or tarpaulin tilt. As an artillery tractor, rather than a cargo vehicle, the wooden sides were fixed in place without folding down, but did have a narrow crew door on each side. (Note: The Scammell Pioneer had a similar arrangement.) Two transverse bench seats were provided for the gun crew, reached through the side doors, at the 1st side bay on the left and the 2nd on the right.

The cab was framed in ash and clad in steel. It was equipped with a winch (7-ton load in its case) like all artillery tractors. The O853 provided the basis for the 'Dorchester' armoured command vehicle.

AEC also produced a larger 6×6 vehicle, model O854, based on components from both the AEC Marshal 6x4 and the 4×4 Matador. These were produced in both petrol and diesel and were also referred to as Matadors. The O854 provided the basis for the O857.

A small number of petrol-engined 4x4 Matadors were also built. These were given the model number 853.

== Service ==
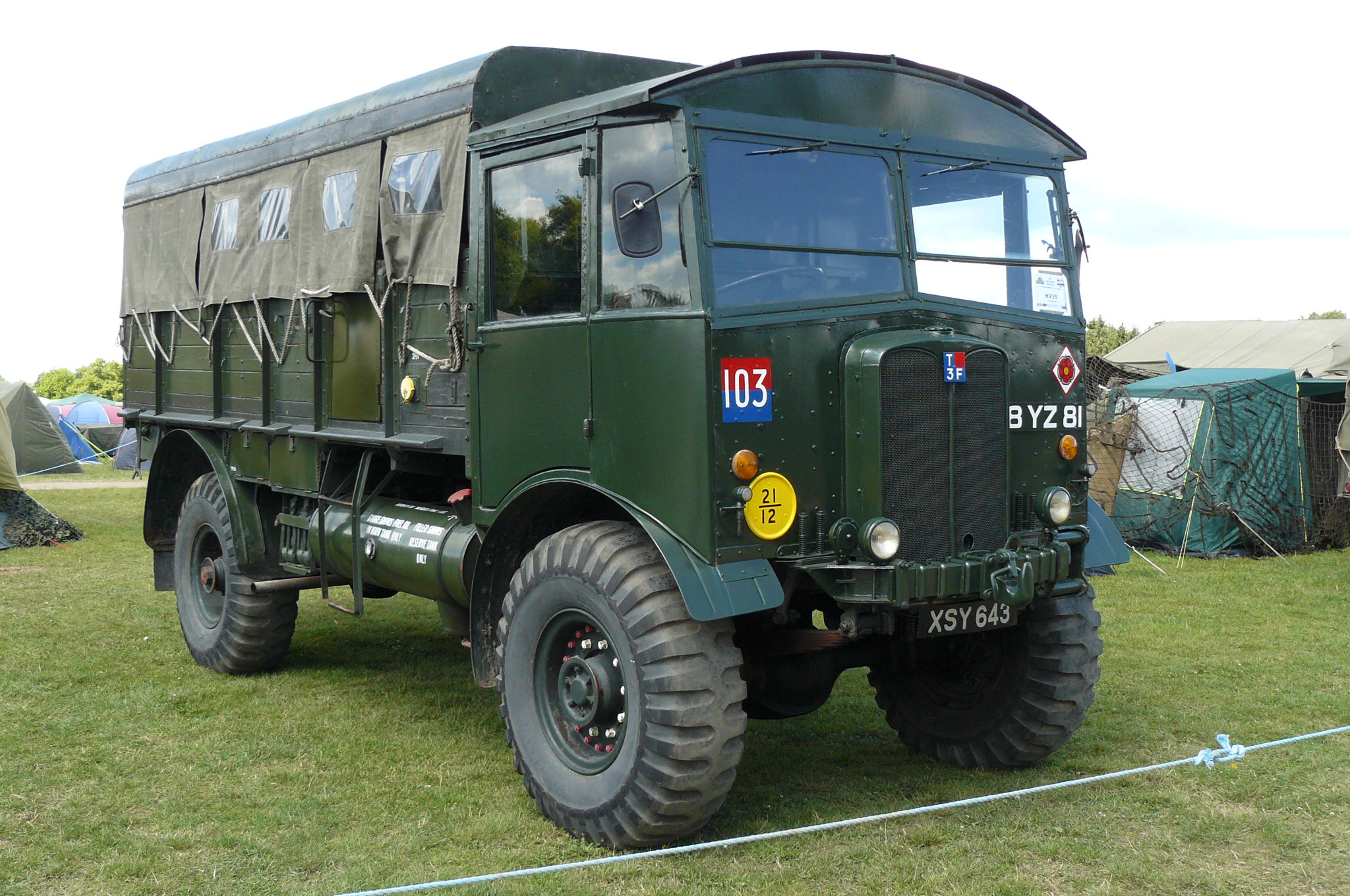
Preserved Matador artillery tractor, Beltring 2011

Over 9,600 Matadors were built, some going to the Royal Air Force (RAF).

For the British Army, it fulfilled a role between field artillery tractors (FATs) such as the Morris C8 Quad, which towed smaller guns such as the 25-pounder gun-howitzer, and the Scammell Pioneer, used for towing the 7.2-inch howitzer. It was commonly used to tow the 5.5-inch medium gun and the QF 3.7-inch AA gun. The Matador was found to be a generally useful vehicle and was adapted for other roles, including carrying a 25-pounder gun.

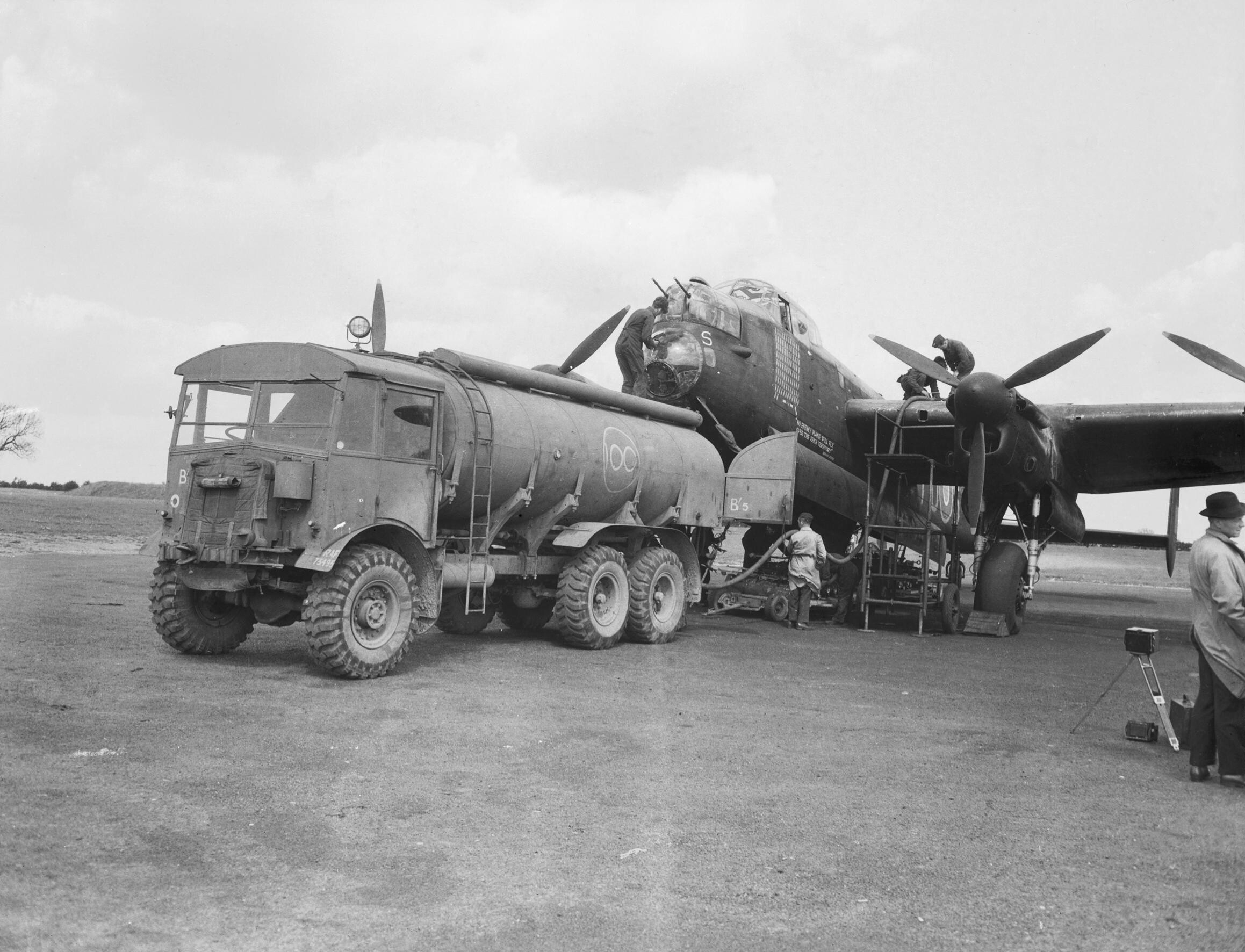
AEC 854 refueling an Avro Lancaster, 1944

The RAF used Matadors in the flat bed form for load carrying. The 6-wheeler Matador Type A with refuelling pumps and equipment by Zwicky Ltd, was used as a refuelling tanker, capable of carrying 2,500 imperial gallons (11,000 L; 3,000 US gal) of fuel and also for towing ashore Short Sunderland flying boats at their stations.

Six armoured flamethrowers, the 'Heavy Cockatrice' on the 6×6 chassis, were used by the RAF for airfield defence against paratroopers.

In 1942/43, for the North African campaign, some Matadors mounted the 6-pounder anti-tank gun to give the AEC Mk1 Gun Carrier "Deacon".

The Canadian Army used the Matador during World War II.

=== Post-war ===
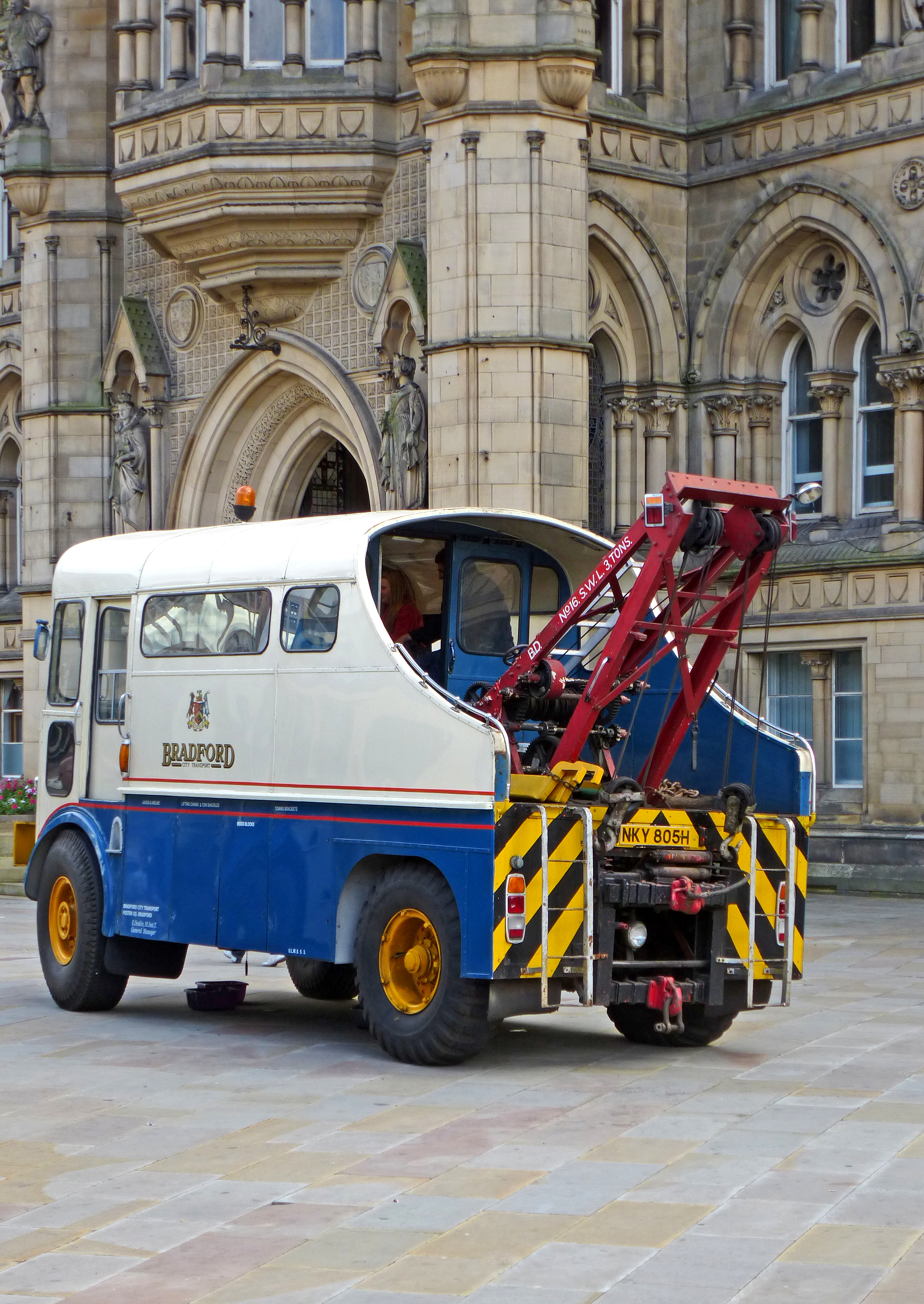
Bus recovery truck, converted and civil registered in 1970

Post-war, the Matador was found in civilian use as a recovery truck, a showman's vehicle, and general contractor use. It was also useful for forestry work because of its good off-road performance. When used as a bus fleet recovery truck, many were fitted with lifting jibs for suspended towing and re-bodied with semi-enclosed bodies, often based on bodywork from scrapped buses.

== See also ==
- Bedford QLD - 3 ton general service truck four wheel drive, 4WD, introduced 1941.
- Austin K2/Y
- Canadian Military Pattern Field Artillery Tractor
