= List of military equipment of the Canadian Army in World War II =

Flag of Canada used during WWII

At the beginning of the Second World War, Canada did not have an extensive manufacturing industry besides car manufacturing. Therefore, most of Canadian weapons and equipment during the war were imported from either Britain or the US.

== Knives and bayonets ==
Model	From	Blade length	Comments	
Fairbairn–Sykes fighting knife	1941	18 cm	Various models.	
Ross bayonet	1905	?	Stepped guard on early model, flat on later model. Sharpened later models were taken overseas in World War I.	
P1907 bayonet	1907	21 3/4 in (550 mm)	Used on No. 1 rifle (previously called SMLE)	
No. 4 MK. II bayonet	1941	8 in (200 mm)	Used on No. 4 MK. I, No. 4 MK. I* and Sten MK. V	
M346	?	90mm	Standard issue containing a 90mm sheeps foot blade, a 40mm stab/can opener blade, a 100mm fid/ marlin spike and a lanyard bale wire loop, based on the Case Model 6353/1905. Manufactured by Case in the USA for the Canadian Military until 1948 when production moved to Pictou, Nova Scotia, Canada. Markings include "Case XX Metal Stampings" on the base of the sheeps foot blade and a C with a broad arrow inside stamped on the scales (case) normally near the rivet holding the blades.	Standard issue knife for Canadian troops in WW2. Similar versions from different manufacturers were issued from WW1 through 1970s.

== Small arms ==
=== Pistols ===
Model	Origin	Acquired	Type	Cartridge	Variants	Notes
Colt Model 1911	United States	1914	Semi-automatic	.45 ACP	Model 1911; Model 1911A1	Canada purchased some in World War I and more in World War II.
Smith & Wesson Triple Lock	United States	1917	Revolver	.455 Webley	2nd Model	Low-cost version
Browning Hi-Power	Belgium	1944	Semi-automatic	9×19mm Parabellum	Pistol No.1 Mk.1; Pistol No.2 Mk.1	Produced under license in Canada by John Inglis & Company
Smith & Wesson Model 10	United States	1942	Revolver	.38-200	S&W Victory Model	
Webley Revolver	United Kingdom	1915	Revolver	.455 Webley	Webley .455 Mk.VI	Obsolete, secondary sidearm
Enfield No. 2	United Kingdom	1932	Revolver	.38-200	Mk.1	Secondary sidearm
Colt Police Positive	United States	1907	Revolver	.38 S&W		Secondary sidearm

=== Submachine guns ===
Model	Origin	Acquired	Action	Cartridge	Variants	Notes
Thompson	United States	1942	Blowback, "Blish Lock"	.45 ACP	Model 1928; Model 1928A1; M1; M1A1	
Sten	United Kingdom Canada	1941	Blowback, Open bolt	9×19mm Parabellum	Mk. II; Mk. III; Mk. V	
M50 Reising	United States	1941	Blowback, Closed bolt	.45 ACP	M50	Extremely limited use, primarily by the Veterans Guard of Canada for guard duties.

=== Rifles ===
Model	Origin	Acquired	Action	Cartridge	Variants	Notes
Lee–Enfield No.1	United Kingdom	1916	Bolt-action	.303 British Mk.VII	Mk.III; Mk.III*	
Lee–Enfield No.4	United Kingdom	1943	Bolt-action	.303 British Mk.VII	Mk.I; Mk.6*	Primary service rifle.
Pattern 1914 Enfield	United Kingdom	1914	Bolt-action	.303 British Mk.VII		For training and use by snipers. Some used Warner & Swasey Company scopes previously fitted to Ross sniper rifles.
M1917 Enfield	United States	1917	Bolt-action	.30-06 Springfield		Limited domestic use.
Ross	Canada	1910	Straight pull bolt-action	.303 British Mk.VII	Mk.III; Mk.III*	For training and Veteran's Guard of Canada use only.

=== Grenades and grenade launchers ===
This list is grossly incomplete, listing a small fraction of approximately 30 grenade varieties used by Canadians during World War II.

Grenade	Launcher	Introduced	Type	Weight, g	comments
No. 36 M MK. I	cup discharger for No. 1 rifle	1915	fragmentation	765	most common hand grenade during World War II
No. 68 AT grenade		1940	HEAT	894	52 mm RHA penetration
No. 69 grenade	No	1942	high-explosive	383	bakelite case
No. 73 grenade	No	1940	high-explosive	2000	51mm RHA penetration, used mostly for demolition
No. 74 Sticky bomb	No	1940	HESH	~900	low-cost
No. 75 AT Hawkins Mine	No	1942	high-explosive	1020	most common Canadian AT weapon & demolition charge during World War II
No. 82 Gammon	No	1943	universal	1140	soft body

=== Flamethrowers ===
Flamethrower, Portable, No 2 "Ack-Pack"

== Machine guns ==
=== Infantry and dual-purpose machine guns ===
Type	Production	Fire rate, RPM	Effective range	Cartridge	From:	Produced	Weight	Comment
Bren Gun (various marks)	Inglis, Toronto	510	600	.303 British (7.7×56mmR)	1939	599000	10.35 kg	replacement for Lewis gun
Lewis gun (standard model; U.S. version; Automatic Ship's Lewis Gun)		550	800	.303 British (7.7×56mmR) or .30/06	1917	?	13 kg	occasional AA gun, limited production during World War II
Vickers machine gun (various marks and models)		475	2000	.303 British (7.7×56mmR)	1912	?	23 kg	Vickers Gas Operated was standard flexible MG on aircraft early in World War II.
M2HB Browning machine gun		550	1800	.50 BMG (12.7×99mm)	1921	3000000	23 kg	used until present (2014)
M1919A4		500	1400	.30/06	1919	5000000	14 kg	In 1970s converted to 7.62 NATO

== Artillery ==
=== Infantry mortars ===
Model	Caliber	Max. range	From	Produced	Weight, kg	fire rate, RPM	Comment
2 inch Mortar (standard and airborne lightweight models)	50.8mm	460	1937	?	4.8	8	elevated by hand
M19 mortar	60mm	1790	1942	?	9.3	8	received after M19 was rejected by US military
3 inch Mortar Mk. II	81.2mm	1463	1931	?	50.8	15	crew of 3
M2 4.2 inch mortar	106.7mm	4023	1943	?	151	5	prepared for chemical bombs delivery, never used

=== Heavy mortars & rocket launchers ===
Land Mattress C-21 UCM -

=== Field artillery ===
Model	Caliber	Max. range	From	Produced	Weight, kg	fire rate, RPM	Comment
QF 18-pounder	83.8mm	5966	1904	10469	1282	4	obsolete at start of World War II
QF 25-pounder	87.6mm	12253	1940	13000	1633	7	main Canadian World War II field gun/howitzer
BL 4.5 inch Medium Field Gun	114mm	18000	1938	?	6190	2.5	built in UK by Canadian companies
BL 5.5 inch Medium Gun	140mm	16550	1941	?	5900	2	received from UK
BL 60-pounder	127mm	15500	1905	1756	4400	2	in Canadian service until start of World War II

=== Anti-tank guns ===
Model	Caliber	Penetration 1	Penetration 2	Muzzle speed	Max. range	From	Produced	Weight, kg	fire rate, RPM	Comment
QF 2-pdr	40 mm	37 mm @ 457 m	27 mm @ 914 m	792	1000	1936	12000	814	22	
QF 6-pdr	57 mm	88 mm @ 100 m	-	884	1600	1941	?	1140	?	produced in both UK and Canada
QF 17-pdr	76.2 mm	130 mm @ 500 m	119 mm @ 1000 m	880	1800	1942	?	3050	?	-

== Anti-tank weapons (besides anti-tank guns) ==
- Boys Anti-Tank Rifle
- PIAT-1943-1950s
- Clam Magnetic Mine
- Mk 5 mine
- Mk 2 mine
- Bazooka

Bangalore torpedo (not a grenade or anti-tank)

== Anti-aircraft weapons ==
Model	Caliber	Eff. alt.	From	Produced	Weight, kg	fire rate, RPM	Comment
QF 3.7-inch AA gun Mk1	94mm	7300	1941	?	9317	15	
Bofors 40 mm gun L/60	40mm	4100	1932	2250	1981	120	still in service (2014)
Polsten-Oerlikon gun	20mm	1000	1944	57	4000	450	low-cost

== Vehicles ==
Canada produced a wide variety of combat vehicles during World War II domestically, but all primary fighting vehicles were imported because of manufacturing quality concerns.

=== Tankettes ===
Carden Loyd Mk IV tankette - not used in combat

=== Tanks ===
Model	From	Armor max. (mm)	Primary armament	Secondary armament	Weight ( t)	Power (kW)	Range (km)	# Produced (Note: Total manufactured, not number used by Canadian forces)	Crew	Comments
Stuart tank	1941	51	37mm Gun M3 L/24	3×.30-06 Browning M1919A4 MG	14.7	190	119	25000	4	imported
Churchill tank Mk 1	1941	102	QF 2-pdr	2 × 7.92 mm Besa machine gun	38.5	261	90	7368	4	given to Canada for Dieppe Raid
Churchill Oke	1942	102	QF-2-pdr; Ronson flamethrower	2 × 7.92 mm Besa machine gun	38.5	261	90	3	4	all destroyed in Dieppe Raid
Centaur IV	1944	76	Ordnance QF 95 mm howitzer	2×7.92mm Besa machine gun	28	450	270	114	5	support tank
Sherman I, III, V	1942	76	75 mm Gun M2/M3/M6	1 × 12.7mm Browning M2HB and 2 × 7.8mm Browning M1919A4	30.3	298	193	?	5	Lend-Lease
Sherman Firefly IC & VC	1943	89	QF 17-pdr	12.7mm Browning M2HB and 7.8mm Browning M1919A4	33	298	193	2,150	4	American chassis with British gun
Sherman V DD	1942	76	75 mm Gun M2/M3/M6	1×12.7mm Browning M2HB and 2×7.8mm Browning M1919A4	30.3	298	193	?	5	M4 with flotation screen and propeller
Ram Badger flame tank	1941	87	QF 6-pdr	Wasp II flamethrower and 2×7.62mm machine guns	29	298	232	?	5	later versions had flamethrower replacing main gun
Sherman Badger flame tank	1942	76	75 mm Gun M2/M3/M6	Wasp IIC flamethrower and 2×7.8mm Browning M1919A4	30.3	298	193	?	5	replacement for Ram Badger flame tank
Grizzly I	1943	75	75 mm M3 L/40 gun	2×.30-06 Browning M1919A4 MG	29.91	298	193	188	5	Canadian-built modified M4 Sherman, chassis used for Sexton self-propelled gun
M10 tank destroyer	1942	57	76.2 mm Gun M7	1×12.7mm Browning M2HB	29.6	276	300	6706	5	tank destroyer
Achilles	1944	57.2	QF 17-pdr (76mm)	1×12.7mm Browning M2HB	29.6	276	300	1,100	5	tank destroyer M10 with British gun
Archer	1943	60	QF 17-pdr (76mm)	1× .303 Bren LMG	15	145	230	655	4	tank destroyer
Light Tank Mk VIA	1936	14	Vickers .50 machine gun (12.7mm)	1× .303 Vickers machine gun	4.93	67	210	1,682	3	not used in combat
Ram tank I and II	1941	87	QF 6-pdr	3×7.62mm machine guns	29	298	232	2000	5	In field conversions saw combat in Europe, based on M3 hull.
Valentine Mk.VI	1941	65	QF 2-pdr (40mm)	1×.30-06 Browning M1919A4 MG	16.5	104	130	1420	3	Canadian-built, provided to USSR
Matilda II infantry tank	1937	78	QF 2-pdr (40mm)	1×7.92 mm Besa machine gun	25	72	257	2987	4	not used in combat
M3 Lee/Grant	1941	51	75mm M2/M3 gun	(2-4)×7.8mm Browning M1919A4	27	300	193	6258	?	not used in combat

=== Self-propelled guns ===
==== Tank-based ====
Name	Chassis	Gun	Developed	Manufactured	Role
Sexton	M3 Lee	QF 25-pdr (87.6 mm) Mk II	1942	2150	self-propelled gun
M7 Priest	M3 Lee	M101 howitzer (105mm)	1942	4443	self-propelled gun
Crusader III, AA Mk.I	Crusader	Bofors 40 mm gun	1944	?	self-propelled AA gun
Mk.II/III	Crusader	2×Oerlikon 20mm gun	1944	?	self-propelled AA gun
Skink anti-aircraft tank	M4 Sherman	4×Polsten (20mm)	1944	3	self-propelled AA gun

==== Other ====
M3 75mm Gun Motor Carriage - M3 Half-track equipped with the M1A1 75 mm gun

=== Armored cars ===
Model/Type	Years in Use	Manufacturer	Details
Daimler Dingo		United Kingdom	
Daimler Mk. I Armoured Car		United Kingdom	
Humber Mk. I scout car		United Kingdom	
Humber Mk. IV Armoured Car		United Kingdom	
M3 scout car		United States	
Morris Light Reconnaissance Car		United Kingdom	
Staghound Armoured Car		United States	
Fox Armoured Car		Canada	Humber Armoured Car design modified for Canadian production
Otter Light Reconnaissance Car		Canada	Similar to Humber Light Reconnaissance Car
Lynx scout car		Canada	Similar to Dingo

=== Engineering and command ===
Model/Type	Years in Use	Manufacturer	Details
Ram ARV Mk I and II		Canada	
Valentine Bridgelayer		United Kingdom	
Sherman V ARV		United States	

- Sherman Ib recovery vehicle

=== Tractors & prime movers ===
Model/Type	Years in Use	Manufacturer	Details
Kangaroo (armoured personnel carrier)		Canada	
Loyd Carrier		United Kingdom	
Wasp		United Kingdom	A Universal Carrier with flame-thrower equipment
T-16 Carrier		United States	Lend-Lease based upon Universal Carrier, used to tow artillery
Windsor Carrier		Canada	variation of Universal Carrier
M3A1 Half-track		Various, United States	
M5 Half-track		International Harvester, United States	similar to M3 produced for Lend-Lease
M9A1 Half-track		International Harvester, United States	Variant of M5
M14 Half-track		International Harvester, United States	M3 Half-track with anti-aircraft turret
M5 "Recce"		United States	A turretless M5 light tank used for reconnaissance

=== Miscellaneous vehicles ===
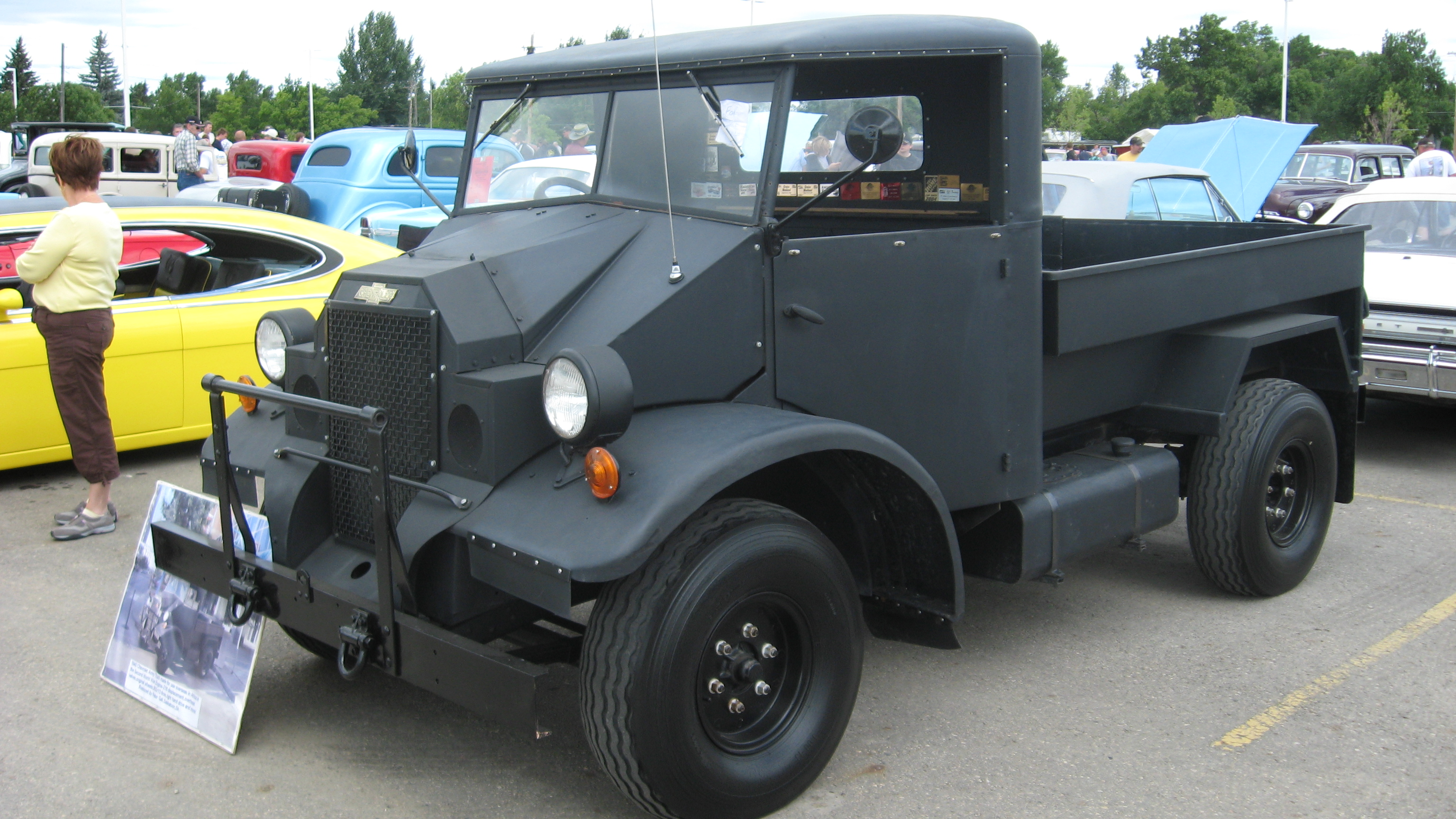
Chevrolet C8 4x2 CMP

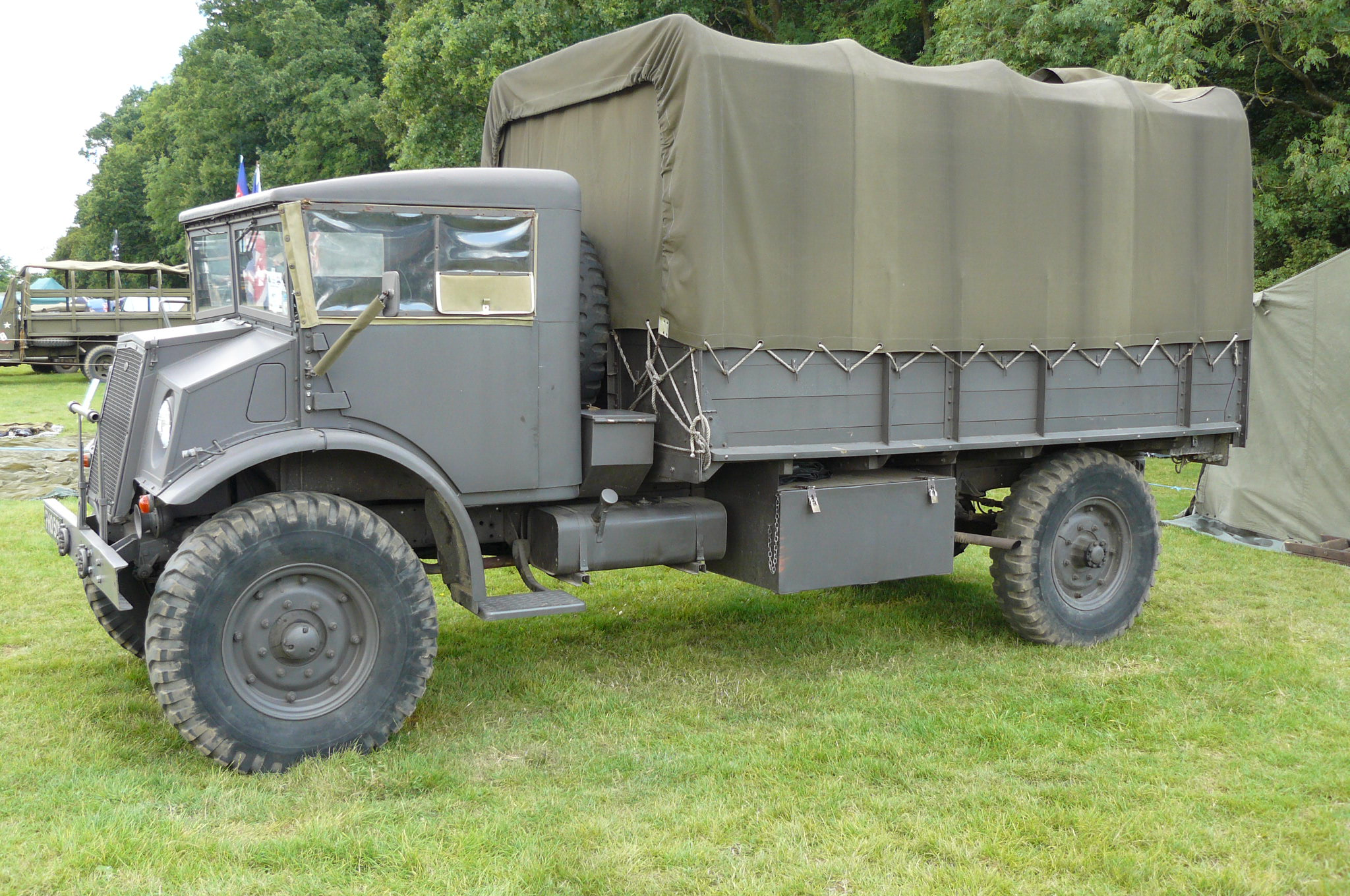
Ford F60A 4x4 CMP

Model	Builder	Country	Load / Comments
AEC Matador	AEC	UK	Field Artillery Tractor
Corbitt 6-ton 6x6	Various	US	6-ton (5440 kg)
Diamond T 4-ton 6x6	Diamond T	US	4-ton (3630 kg)
Dodge D8A (T212)	Dodge	Canada	8cwt (800 lbs, 360 kg)
Ford GP, GPA	Ford	US	1/4-ton 4x4, GPA amphibian
Morris C8	Morris-Commercial	UK	Field Artillery Tractor
Willys MB/Ford GPW	Willys/Ford	US	"Jeep" 1/4-ton 4x4
C/F-8, C/F-8A CMP	Chevrolet/Ford	Canada	8cwt (800 lbs, 360 kg)
C/F-15, C/F-15A CMP	Chevrolet/Ford	Canada	15cwt (3/4-ton, 630 kg)
C/F-30, C/F-30A CMP	Chevrolet/Ford	Canada	30cwt (1 1/2-ton, 1360 kg)
C/F-60, C/F-60A CMP	Chevrolet/Ford	Canada	60cwt (3-ton, 2720 kg)
C-60X 6x6 CMP	Chevrolet	Canada	three driven axles
F-60H 6x4 CMP	Ford	Canada	three axles, rear un-driven
C/F-GT CMP	Chevrolet/Ford	Canada	Field Artillery Tractor

== Aircraft ==
Although the Canadian government purchased and built thousands of military aircraft for use by the RCAF Home War Establishment (RCAF Eastern Air Command and RCAF Western Air Command) and the Canadian-based units of the British Commonwealth Air Training Plan, under the provisions of the plan Canada was to provide the training aircraft and facilities and a very large number of Canadian airmen would be committed to go overseas to fight in Article XV squadrons formed in the Great Britain and known as 400 series squadrons of the Royal Canadian Air Force. Forty-four of these squadrons were formed and most under this agreement were equipped by the British largely from their stocks and that is why many of the types of aircraft flown in combat in great numbers (such as the North American Mustang, Boulton Paul Defiant, Bristol Beaufighter, hundreds of Supermarine Spitfires of various marks, British built Avro Lancasters, Vickers Wellington, Hawker Typhoon, Short Sunderland, etc.) by most of the RCAF squadrons engaged in the fighting are missing from the following list altogether (or the quantities actually used by the RCAF overseas are not included in the numbers given below).

=== Fighters ===
Name	Place of manufacture	Primary role(s)	Service period	# Number used
Armstrong Whitworth Siskin	UK	fighter	1926–1940	12
Hawker Hurricane	UK/Canada	fighter	1939–1948	502
Grumman Goblin	US/Canada	fighter	1940–1942	15
North American NA-44	US	fighter/utility	1940–1944	1
Supermarine Spitfire	UK	fighter	1940–1950	8
Curtiss Kittyhawk	US	fighter	1941–1946	134
Curtiss Warhawk	US	fighter	1942–1943	9
Hawker Sea Hurricane	UK	fighter	1942–1943	1
Curtiss Tomahawk	US	fighter	1943–1946	4
de Havilland Mosquito	UK/Canada	bomber/fighter-bomber	1943–1951	444
Gloster Meteor	UK	fighter	1945–1955	4

=== Attack aircraft ===
Name	Place of manufacture	Primary role(s)	Service period	# used
Blackburn Shark Mk.II & III	UK	torpedo bomber	1936–1944	26
Bristol Beaufort	UK	torpedo bomber/strike/minelayer	1941–1944	15
Brewster Bermuda	US	dive bomber	1943–1946	3
Fairey Swordfish Mk.II & III	UK	torpedo bomber	1943–1947	105
Fairey Albacore	UK	torpedo bomber	1943–1949	6

=== Bombers ===
Name	1968 CF designator	Place of manufacture	Primary role(s)	Service period	# used
Lockheed Hudson	n/a	US	bomber	1939–1948	247
Hawker Hart	n/a	UK	bomber	1937–1943	3
Douglas Digby	n/a	US	bomber	1939–1946	20
Fairey Battle	n/a	UK	bomber/trainer/target tug	1939–1946	740
Bristol Fairchild Bolingbroke	n/a	Canada	bomber/trainer	1939–1947	626
Handley Page Harrow	n/a	UK	bomber/transport	1940–1941	2
Northrop Nomad	n/a	US	light bomber	1940–1945	32
Avro Anson	n/a	UK/Canada	medium bomber/trainer	1940–1947	4413
Handley Page Hampden	n/a	UK	bomber	1941–1944	96
Bristol Blenheim Mk.IV	n/a	UK	medium bomber/gunnery trainer	1941–1945	1
Douglas Boston	n/a	US	bomber	1941–1945	3
Avro Lancaster	n/a	UK/Canada	heavy bomber	1944–1965	229
Martin Baltimore	n/a	US	bomber	1942–1942	1
North American Mitchell	n/a	US	bomber	1942–1963	164
Boeing Fortress Mk.II	n/a	US	long-range patrol bomber	1943–1946	6
Handley Page Halifax	n/a	UK	heavy bomber	1944–1947	76

=== Reconnaissance aircraft ===
Name	1968 CF designator	Place of manufacture	Primary role(s)	Service period	# used
Canadian Vickers Vedette	n/a	Canada	patrol flying boat	1925–1941	44
Canadian Vickers Vancouver	n/a	Canada	patrol flying boat	1929–1940	6
Armstrong Whitworth Atlas	n/a	UK	spotting/liaison	1927–1942	16
Westland Wapiti	n/a	UK	spotting/liaison	1930–1944	25
Hawker Audax	n/a	UK	spotting/liaison	1933–1943	6
Supermarine Stranraer	n/a	Canada	patrol seaplane	1938–1946	40
Westland Lysander	n/a	UK/Canada	spotting/liaison/target tug	1939–1946	329
Consolidated Catalina/Canso	n/a	US/Canada	maritime patrol seaplane	1941–1962	254
Lockheed Ventura	n/a	US	maritime patrol/target tug	1942–1947	28
Supermarine Walrus	n/a	UK	fleet spotter/utility amphibian	1943–1947	8
Consolidated Liberator	n/a	US	maritime patrol	1943–1948	14

=== Trainers ===
Name	1968 CF designator	Place of manufacture	Primary role(s)	Service period	# used
De Havilland Moth	n/a	UK	trainer	1928–1948	89
Curtiss-Reid Rambler	n/a	Canada	trainer/utility	1929–1954	9
Hawker Tomtit	n/a	UK	trainer	1930–1943	2
Avro Tutor (Avro 621)	n/a	UK	trainer	1931–1945	7
Fleet Fawn	n/a	Canada	elementary trainer	1931–1947	51
Avro Prefect (Avro 626)	n/a	UK	trainer	1937–1945	12
de Havilland DH.82C Tiger Moth	n/a	Canada	trainer	1938–1948	1410
Airspeed Oxford	n/a	UK	trainer (navigation, bombing & radio)	1939–1947	819
Fleet Finch	n/a	Canada	elementary trainer	1939–1947	431
North American Harvard	n/a	US/Canada	advanced trainer	1939–1968	2156
North American NA-26	n/a	US	trainer	1940–1942	1
de Havilland Menasco Moth	n/a	Canada	trainer	1941–1947	136
Cessna Crane	n/a	US	trainer	1941–1949	826
Fleet Fort	n/a	Canada	intermediate/radio trainer	1941–1945	101
Hawker Hind	n/a	UK	instructional airframe	1942–1943	4
Stearman Kaydet (Model 75)	n/a	US	elementary trainer	1942–1943	301
General Aircraft Hotspur Mk.II	n/a	UK	training glider	1942–1945	22
Fairchild Cornell	n/a	US	elementary trainer	1942–1948	1555

=== Transports ===
Name	1968 CF designator	Place of manufacture	Primary role(s)	Service period	# used
Consolidated Courier	n/a	US	utility	1928–1941	3
Fairchild 71, 71B & 71C	n/a	US/Canada	transport	1929–1942	23
Bellanca CH-300 Pacemaker	n/a	US	transport	1929–1944	13
Fairchild 51 & 51A	n/a	US/Canada	transport	1930–1946	9
de Havilland Puss Moth	n/a	UK	transport	1931–1944	19
Fairchild Super 71	n/a	Canada	transport	1936–1940	2
Northrop Delta	n/a	Canada	transport/patrol	1936–1945	20
Grumman Goose	n/a	US	utility amphibian	1938–1956	31
Barkley-Grow T8P-1	n/a	US	transport	1939–1941	1
Lockheed Electra	n/a	US	transport	1939–1946	15
Boeing 247D	n/a	US	transport	1940–1942	8
de Havilland Dragonfly	n/a	UK	transport	1940–1945	6
Fairchild Argus	n/a	US	utility	1940–1945	2
Lockheed Electra Junior	n/a	US	transport	1940–1945	10
Lockheed Model 212	n/a	US	transport	1940–1946	1
North American Yale	n/a	US	intermediate/radio trainer	1940–1946	119
Stinson Voyager (Model 105)	n/a	US	utility	1940–1946	25
Noorduyn Norseman	n/a	Canada	utility transport	1940–1957	100
de Havilland Fox Moth	n/a	Canada	transport	1941–1945	1
Beechcraft Expeditor	CT-128	US	utility/trainer	1941–1972	394
Waco AQC-6	n/a	US	utility	1942–1942	1
Fleet Freighter	n/a	Canada	transport	1942–1944	2
Curtiss Seamew	n/a	US	utility floatplane	1943–1944	82
Lockheed Lodestar	n/a	US	transport	1943–1948	18
Douglas Dakota	CC-129	US	transport	1943–1990	169
Waco Hadrian Mk.II	n/a	US	transport glider	1944–1949	32

== Radars ==
- Night Watchman (NW), 200-MHz, 1-kW prototype of SW radars (from 1940)
- CSC - anti-submarine radar, same as SW1 series
- SW1C - surface-warning radar for merchant ships and frigates (from 1941)
- SW2C - frequency changed to 215 MHz (1942)
- SW3C - miniaturization to fit on torpedo boats, plan-position indicator (1943)
- CD radar - coastal defense only (from 1942)
- CDX radar - improvements and export to USSR (from 1943)
- Type 268 – 10 GHz submarine snorkel search radar (from 1944)
- MEW/AS - 2.8 GHz, 300 kW submarine detection radar (from 1943)
- MEW/HF - air search radar (from 1943)
- GL Mk. III(c) - microwave-frequency anti-aircraft gun-laying radar (from 1941)
- Zone Position Indicator (ZPI) - VHF tactical control radar used in concert with GL Mk. III
- Microwave Zone Position Indicator (MZPI) - replacement for ZPI using microwave electronics from GL Mk. III
- 2 other unknown radar types used operationally
- 18 radar types developed but never used

== Cartridges and shells ==
Model/Type	Period or Years in Use	Manufacturer/Origins
.303 British	1939–1945	United Kingdom
.455 Webley	1939–1945	United Kingdom
.38 S&W	1939–1945	United Kingdom
.45 ACP	1939–1945	United States
.30-06 Springfield	1939–1945	United States
9×19mm Parabellum	1944–1945	Belgium
.50 BMG	1939–1945	United States
.55 Boys	1937–1945	United Kingdom

== Uniforms, Load Bearing and Protective Equipment ==
=== Uniforms ===
Model/Type	Period or years in use	Manufacturer/origins
Canadian Pattern and British Pattern		
Khaki Drill	1939–1945	United Kingdom
Battle Dress 1939-early 1970s		United Kingdom
Denison smock Used by the Airborne		United Kingdom

=== Load bearing equipment ===
Model/Type	Period or Years in Use	Manufacturer/Origins
1937 pattern web equipment		United Kingdom
1942 Battle Jerkin		United Kingdom

=== Head dress ===
Model/Type	Period or Years in Use	Manufacturer/Origins
Glengarry		United Kingdom
Tam o'shanter		United Kingdom
Side cap		United Kingdom
Beret		United Kingdom
Helmet, MK II		United Kingdom
Mk III Turtle helmet		United Kingdom

== See also ==
- List of infantry weapons of the Canadian military
