= Armoured Carrier Wheeled Indian Pattern =

British Indian armoured car

Armoured Carrier, Wheeled, Indian Pattern Mk IIA
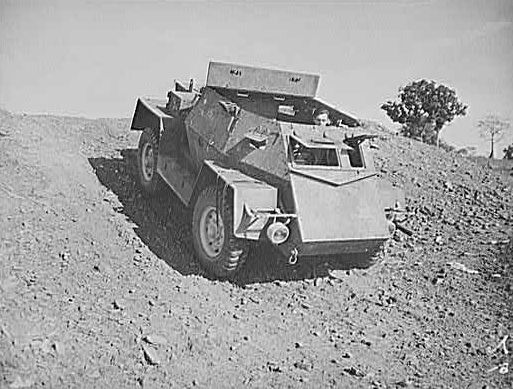
- Newly completed vehicle on a testing ground in India
- Type: Armoured car
- Place of origin: British India

Production history
- Produced: 1940-1944
- No. built: 4,655

Specifications
- Mass: 2,626 kg (2.585 long tons)
- Length: 4.72 m (15 ft 6 in)
- Width: 2.26 m (7 ft 5 in)
- Height: 1.98 m (6 ft 6 in)
- Crew: 3-4
- Armour: 14 mm
- Main armament: Boys anti-tank rifle and / or 0.303 in (7.7 mm) Bren light machine gun
- Engine: Ford V-8 petrol engine. 95 hp (71 kW)
- Suspension: 4 × 4 wheel, leaf spring
- Operational range: 360 km (220 miles)
- Maximum speed: 80 km/h (50 mph)

Armoured Carrier, Wheeled, Indian Pattern (ACV-IP), known also as Indian Pattern Carrier or other similar names, was an armoured car produced in India during the Second World War. It was typically armed with a Bren light machine gun. Those produced by TATA Engineering and Locomotive Company (TELCO) were called "Tatanagars" after the location of the works at Jamshedpur. 4,655 were produced, used by Indian units in the Far East and Mediterranean and Middle East Theatre, typically in divisional reconnaissance regiments.

== History ==
At the outbreak of the Second World War, the United Kingdom was unable to meet the needs of the Commonwealth for armoured fighting vehicles. It led many Commonwealth countries to develop their own vehicles. As production of heavy armoured vehicles, such as tanks, required advanced industry which those countries lacked, most of the developed fighting vehicles were armoured cars, often based on imported chassis.

In India a series of armoured vehicles was developed, known as Armoured Carrier, Wheeled, Indian Pattern or ACV-IP. These vehicles used Ford or GMC CMP truck chassis imported from Canada. Armoured hulls were constructed mainly by the TATA Engineering and Locomotive Company. The armament typically consisted of Bren light machine gun, in some variants mounted in a small turret and Boys anti-tank rifle. The No. 19 radio set was carried. The vehicle was in production from 1940 until 1944, 4,655 being built.

The ACV-IP was used by Indian units in the Far East and Mediterranean and Middle East Theatre, typically in divisional reconnaissance regiments, as reconnaissance vehicle, personnel carrier, AA weapons carrier or Forward Observation Officer vehicle.

== Variants ==
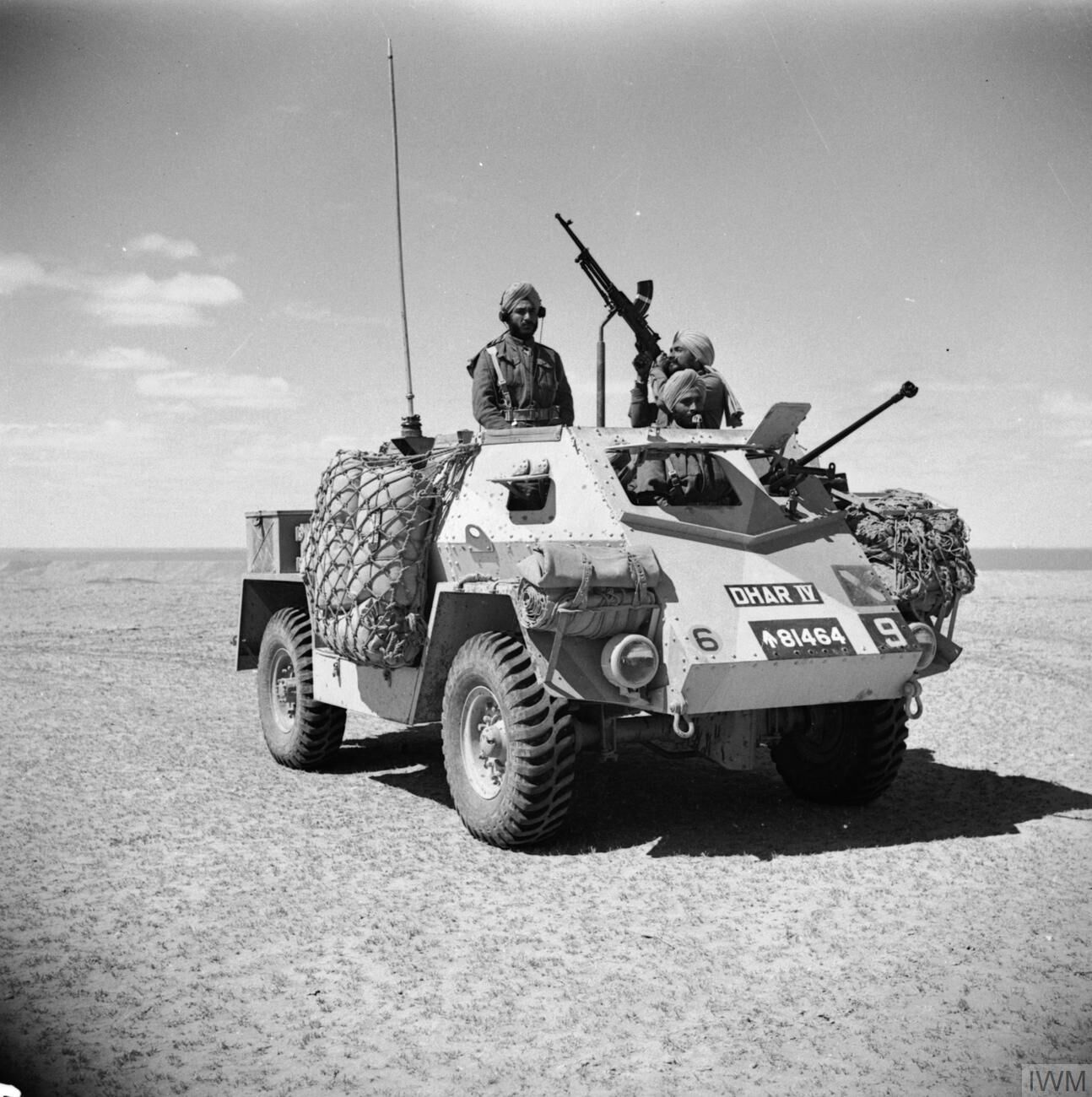
An Indian Pattern Carrier Mk IIA named 'Dhar IV', North Africa, 10 April 1942.

- Mk I — initial version, based on Ford model 1940 truck chassis with motor in front, fitted with a Marmon-Herrington all wheel drive kit.
- Mk II — Ford CO11QRF chassis (all wheel drive, motor in the rear, right hand drive).
- Mk IIA — modified armoured hull.
- Mk IIB — thicker armour.
- Mk IIC — Ford C191QRF chassis, armoured roof and small turret for Bren MG.
- Mk III — similar to Mk IIC, with slightly modified hull. 276 units built.
- Mk IV — Ford C291QR chassis, open hull.

== See also ==
- Jonga
