= CMP FAT =

Canadian artillery tractor

CMP Quad
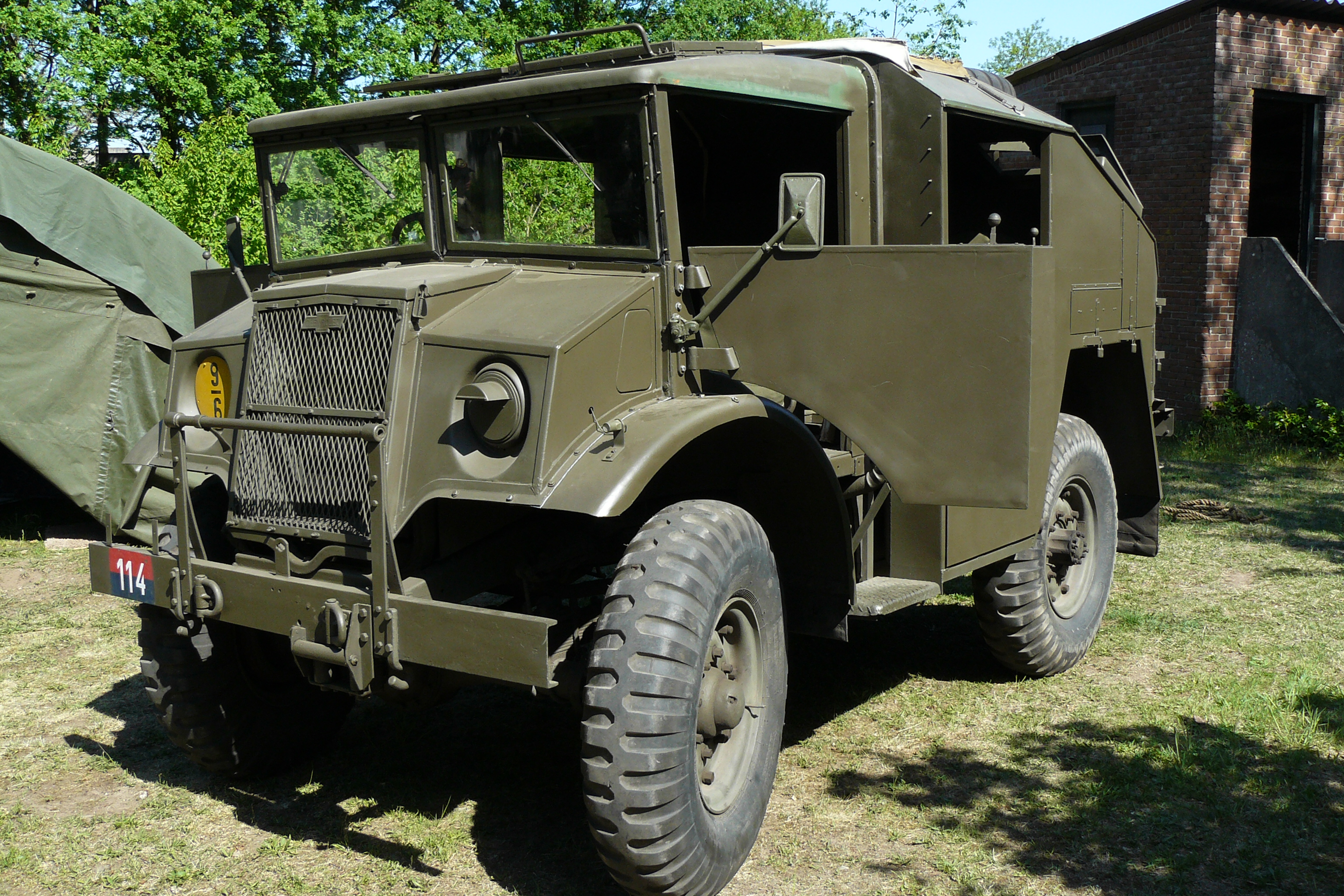
- Seen at Bridgehead, Bussum (Netherlands)
- Type: Artillery tractor
- Place of origin: Canada

Specifications
- Mass: 10,880 lb (4,940 kg) (empty); 13,200 lb (5,990 kg) (gross)
- Length: 14 ft 1 in (4.29 m) (4.10 m)
- Width: 7 ft 6 in (2.29 m) (2.29 m)
- Height: 8 ft (2.44 m) (2.44 m)
- Crew: 1 + 5 passengers
- Armor: none
- Engine: Chevrolet, 6-cyl 216 cubic inch petrol 85 bhp (63 kW)
- Suspension: Wheel, 4 x 4

The CMP FAT (Field Artillery Tractor), was a Canadian Military Pattern vehicle manufactured by Ford and Chevrolet. The FAT was an artillery tractor of the British and Commonwealth forces during World War II. Several models were produced by the two manufactures as CGT (Chevrolet Gun Tractor) and FGT (Ford Gun Tractor).

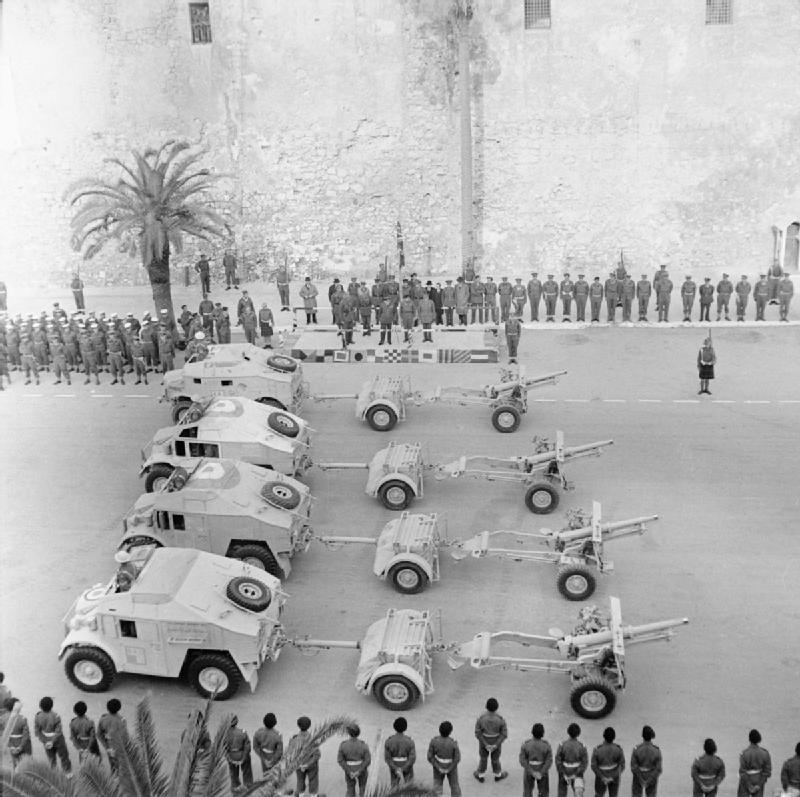
early 'Quad' bodywork, on Chevrolet CGT FAT and a Morris FAT, parading in Tripoli in February 1943

CMP stood for Canadian Military Pattern and was applied to a number of trucks, artillery tractors and utility vehicles built in Canada that combined British design requirements with North American automotive engineering.

As with other FATs, the CMP was usually used to tow either the 25-pounder gun-howitzer or the 17-pounder anti-tank gun. A power winch was located above the rear axle for maneuvering the gun or unbogging the vehicle.

== History ==
Specification was based on the successful British Morris C8 FAT developed before the war, even incorporating right-hand-drive steering. The first models were produced in 1940/41 and the body went through a number of design changes throughout the war. Being based on the British vehicle, CMPs were used extensively by British and Commonwealth forces replacing lost stocks after the Dunkirk evacuation.

Post-war examples were supplied to Denmark who provided their own bodywork.

== Variants ==
Main vehicles were produced as :

- Chevrolet 8440/CGT Tractor, 4x4, Field Artillery
  - 6-cylinder engine delivering 85 bhp
- Ford C291Q FGT Tractor, 4x4, Field Artillery
  - 239 cu in (3.92 L) inch V8 engine delivering 95 bhp. 8,880 lb (4.03 t) weight. 101 inch wheelbase

These could be fitted with different bodies:

- 7A1 beetle-back body with two doors and solid roof
- 7A2 beetle back body with two doors and open (canvas covered) centre roof section
- 7B1 beetle-back body with four doors and open (canvas covered) centre roof section
- 7B2 beetle-back body with four doors and open (canvas covered) centre roof section. Tyre carrier on rear sloped roof.
- 7B3 Open body canvas roof with four doors Tyre carrier on rear upper cargo body.

FATs made locally in Australia had different bodies.

FATs supplied to India were shipped as bare chassis. Bodies were locally made upon delivery. Some vehicles had armoured bodies locally made, while the majority were of wooden construction.

== See also ==
- Canadian Military Pattern trucks
- Morris C8, a similar British vehicle by Morris. This had very similar bodywork to the early CMP FAT, but can be identified by a five-sided windscreen glass, with the upper corner cut away, compared to the four-sided CMP screen.
- List of military equipment of the Canadian Army during the Second World War
