= Canadian Military Pattern truck =

Canadian Military Pattern (CMP) trucks
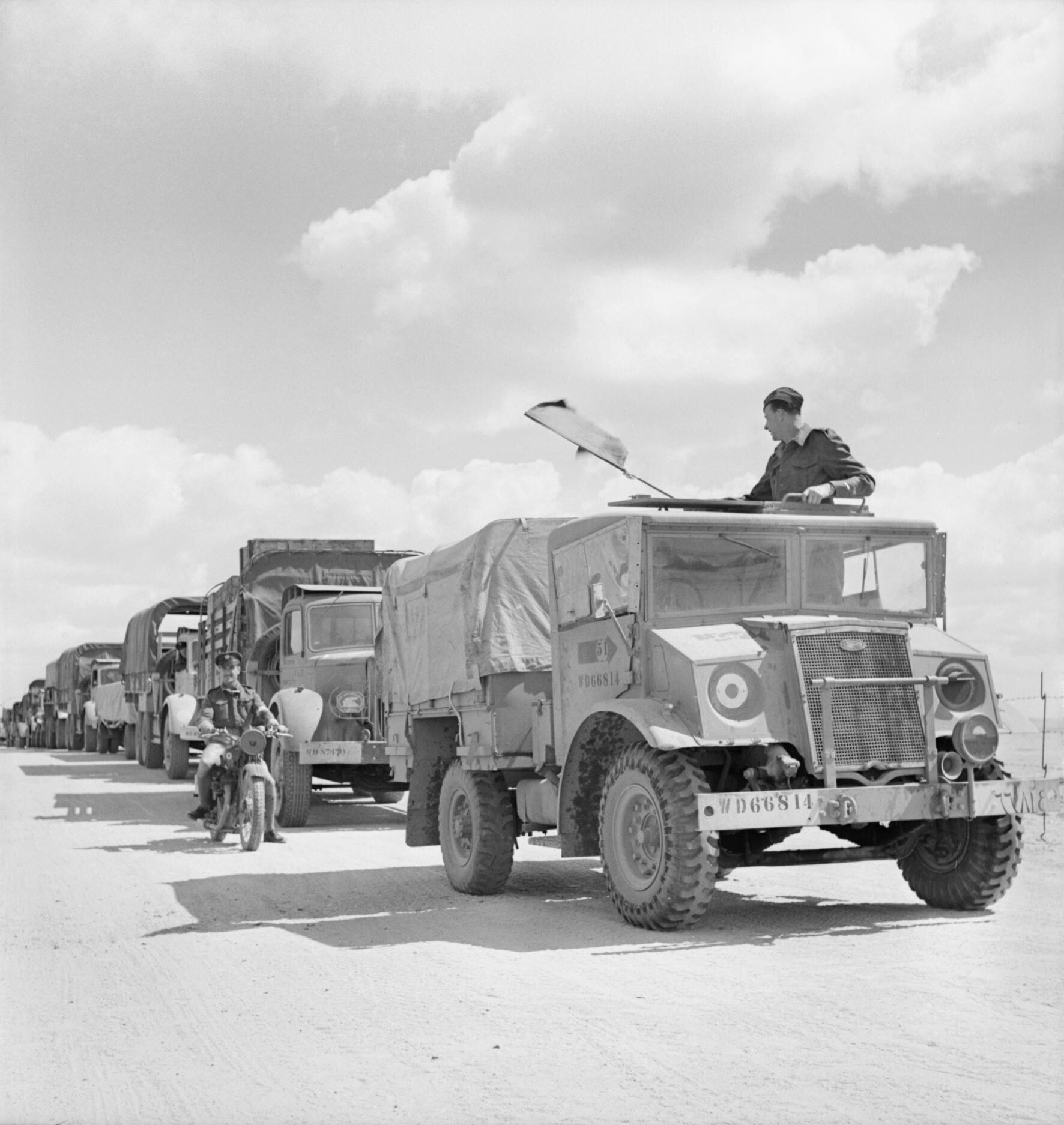
- A Ford F15 (4×2) leading an RAF convoy in North Africa
- Type: Cargo truck
- Place of origin: Canada

Service history
- In service: 1940–Present
- Wars: World War II; Malayan Emergency; Indonesian National Revolution; First Indochina War; 1948 Arab–Israeli War; Portuguese Colonial War; Indo-Pakistani war of 1971

Production history
- Designer: General Motors Canada; Ford Canada; Chrysler Canada
- Designed: 1936–1940
- Manufacturer: General Motors Canada (Chevrolet division); Ford Canada; Chrysler Canada (Dodge division)
- Produced: 1940 – 1945
- No. built: 500,000+

Specifications (Ford F15)
- Mass: 7,875 lb (3.572 t)
- Length: 204 in (5.18 m)
- Width: 84 in (2.13 m)
- Height: 116 in (2.95 m)
- Engine: Ford V8 Flathead engine 95 bhp (71 kW), 239 cu in (3.9 L)
- Payload capacity: 15cwt or 1,680 lb (762.04 kg)
- Drive: 4×2
- Maximum speed: 50 mph (80 km/h)

Canadian Military Pattern (CMP) trucks were mutually coherent ranges of military trucks, compliant with British Army specifications, made in large numbers, and in several classes and numerous versions, by Canada's branches of the U.S. 'Big Three' auto-makers during World War II. (Note: At first, only Ford and GM of Canada engaged in mass-producing the CMP trucks. Chrysler (Dodge) was contracted much later, when significant additional truck production became necessary. To allow Dodge to begin quickly, Dodge was not required to retool their factory to produce trucks that complied with all the British CMP specifications – most crucially, Dodge's 3-ton trucks were all 6x4, lacking front-wheel drive.) They were primarily intended for use by the armies of the British Commonwealth allies, but also served in other British Empire units.

Canadian factories produced some 850,000 vehicles in World War II, including about 50,000 armoured vehicles, self-propelled guns and tanks. However, of greatest significance was the huge number of medium-heavy and medium trucks – over 800,000 – produced by Ford, GM and Chrysler of Canada. (Note: For context, this amounts to about one third of the U.S.' production of some 2.4 million trucks across all payload classes, which included ~650,000 1/4-ton "trucks" (jeeps), 20-ton trucks, and everything in between. More specifically, Canada's production of over 500,000 trucks of 60cwt – 3 tonnes or 3.3 (U.S.) short tons in off-road payload rating – rivalled G.M.'s output of ~560,000 GMC CCKW 2 1/2-ton 6x6 trucks.)

Until the currency restrictions of the late 1940s, the Canadian automotive industry provided a significant number of vehicles for British Empire countries. Under the "Imperial Preference" scheme, those territories reduced import duties on Canadian products, usually made by Canadian subsidiaries of the big U.S. auto manufacturers. In the late 1930s, to prepare for war, Canada started drawing up standard designs, which involved a unique and historic design-and-production collaboration between rival giant car-makers, especially Ford Canada and GM of Canada.

Canadian Military Pattern trucks not only motorized the forces of Britain, Canada, Australia and New Zealand, but were also sent to the Soviet Union after the German invasion, as part of Canada's Gift and Mutual Aid program to the Allies, comparable to the U.S. Lend-Lease Act.

During the war, CMP trucks saw service around the world: in the North African campaign, the Allied invasion of Sicily, the Italian Campaign, the Eastern Front, the Burma campaign, the Philippines, the liberation of Northwest Europe, and the Western Allied invasion of Germany. CMP trucks also served in post-war conflicts in Indonesia, French Indochina, and the Portuguese colonies in Africa.

The United Kingdom's official History of the Second World War called Canada's war-time production of soft-skinned trucks, including the CMP class, the country's most important contribution to Allied victory. Canada's trucks are considered to have "put the British Army on wheels". In the North African Campaign, the British Eighth Army fought Panzer Army Africa using almost exclusively CMP trucks, and the Allied progress from Sicily through Italy and France depended heavily on the Canadian trucks. By the end of the war, Canada's vast supply of trucks provided a vehicle for every three soldiers in the field — compared to one vehicle per seven American soldiers — making it the most mobile army in the world.

== History ==
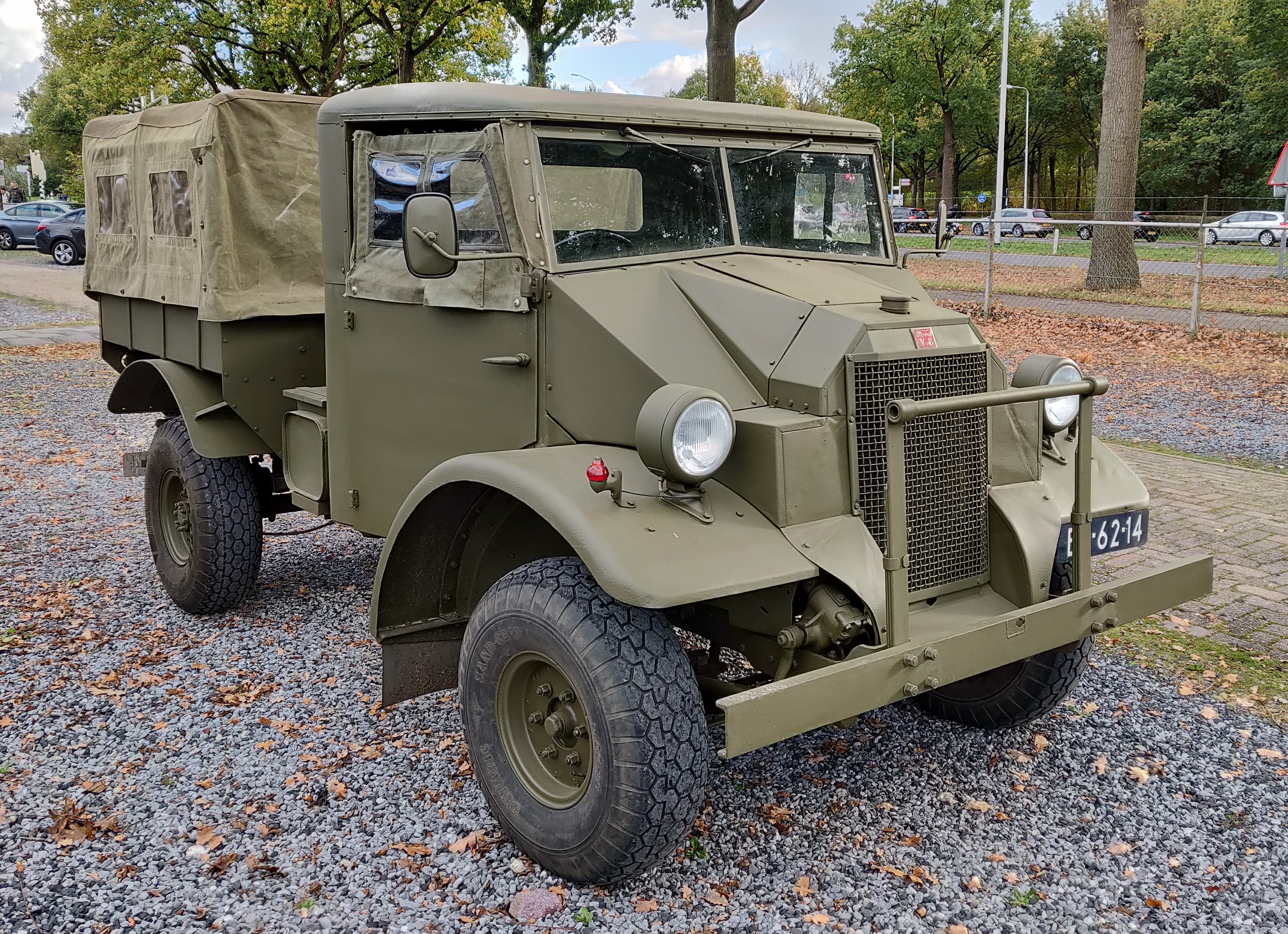
Ford F8 CMP truck with Type 11 cab

The rise to power in Germany of Hitler and the Nazi party in 1933 led to discussions in the mid-1930s between the British War Office and the Canadian Army concerning the possible production of military vehicles in Canada. During the First World War, Canadian land forces had participated as a corps in the British Army. In any future conflict it was assumed that Canadian forces would again be tightly integrated with those of the Mother Country, and so it would be essential that Canadian-manufactured equipment be compatible with British standards and specifications.

Early in 1937, the Ford Motor Company of Canada and General Motors of Canada Ltd were each invited by the Canadian Department of National Defence to produce a Canadian prototype of a 15-hundredweight (cwt) (¾-ton U.S.) payload rating, light infantry truck similar to the Morris CS8 that had then been recently adopted by the British War Office. By 1938, Canadian military authorities had shifted their interest to heavier 4x4 and 6x4 designs. In that year, Ford and General Motors of Canada Limited were invited to produce prototypes of a 6x4 medium artillery tractor derived from the British 6x4 Scammell Pioneer. By 1939, plans had been prepared for the mass production in Canada of a range of military vehicles based on fairly strict CMP British specifications. These trucks were originally designated "Department of National Defence (DND) Pattern"; however, when production volumes increased and it became clear that the Canadian-built vehicles were to serve widely in the forces of other countries, the class of trucks was redesignated "Canadian Military Pattern" (CMP). At the outbreak of World War II, Canada's large and modern automobile industry was shifted over to the production of military vehicles, outproducing Germany.

Initially intended for Canadian military use, the vehicles were soon taken on by all British and Commonwealth forces. While the Dunkirk evacuation in the spring of 1940 succeeded in rescuing close to 340,000 Allied soldiers who had been encircled by the invading German army, the British Expeditionary Force had been forced to abandon most of its military vehicles in France. There then arose an urgent need to replace those losses and to provide new vehicles to equip the rapidly expanding armed forces of the Commonwealth. The logical answer was CMP vehicles, based on the British specification and with large manufacturing capacity.

== Production ==
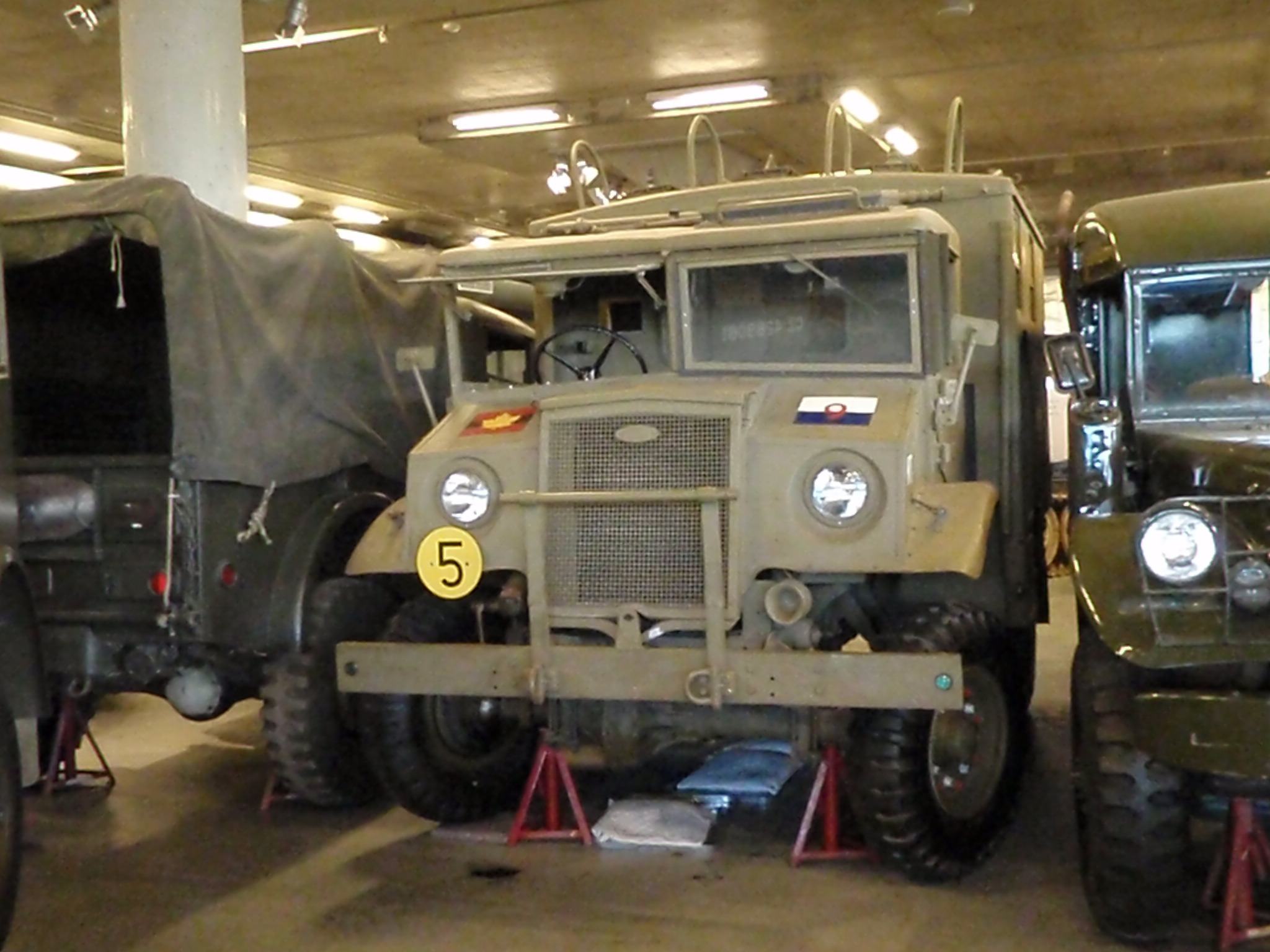
Ford F15A with opened windscreen panel on driver side

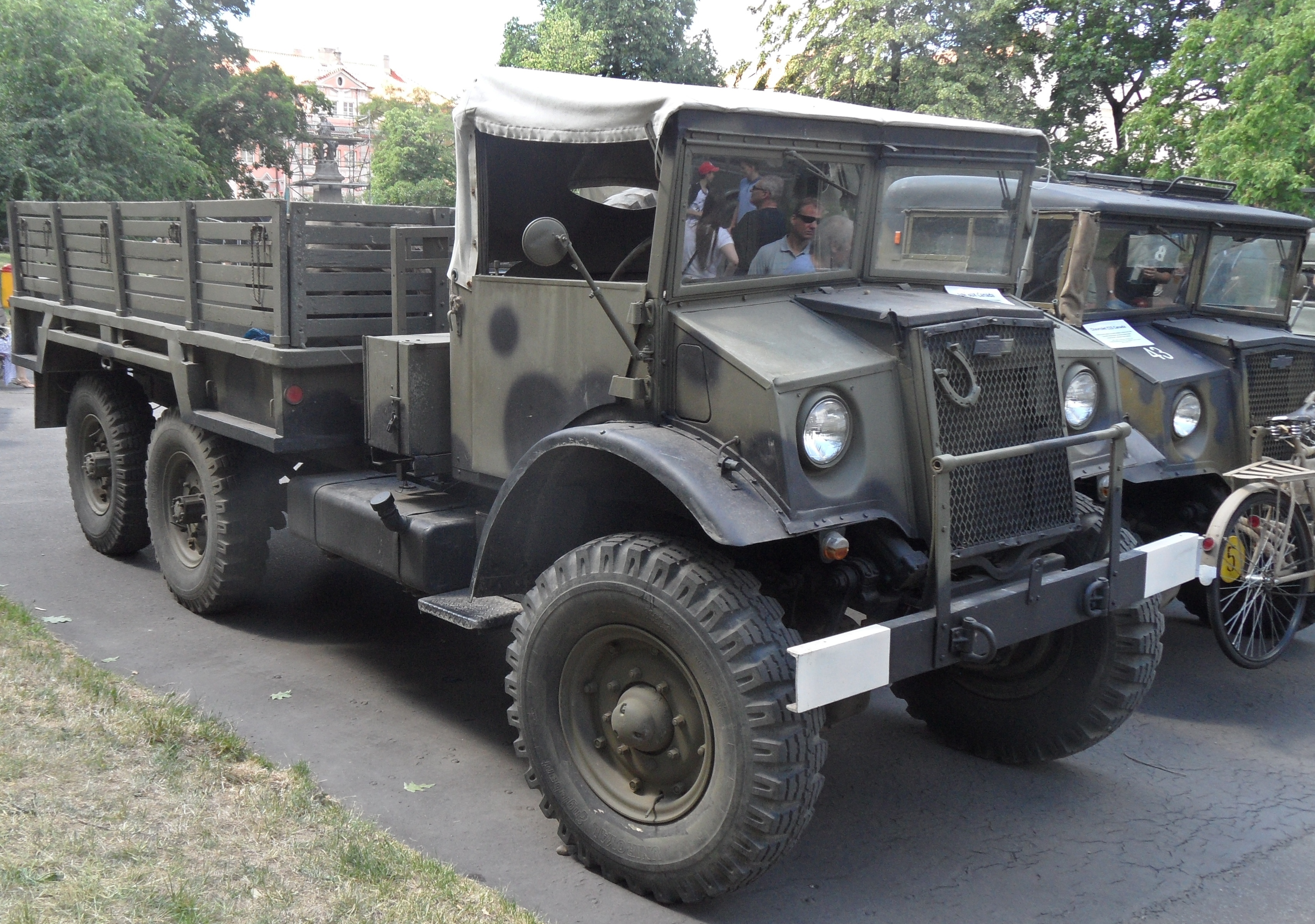
GM / Chevy C60X 6x6 in front; smaller 'bowtie' behind it.

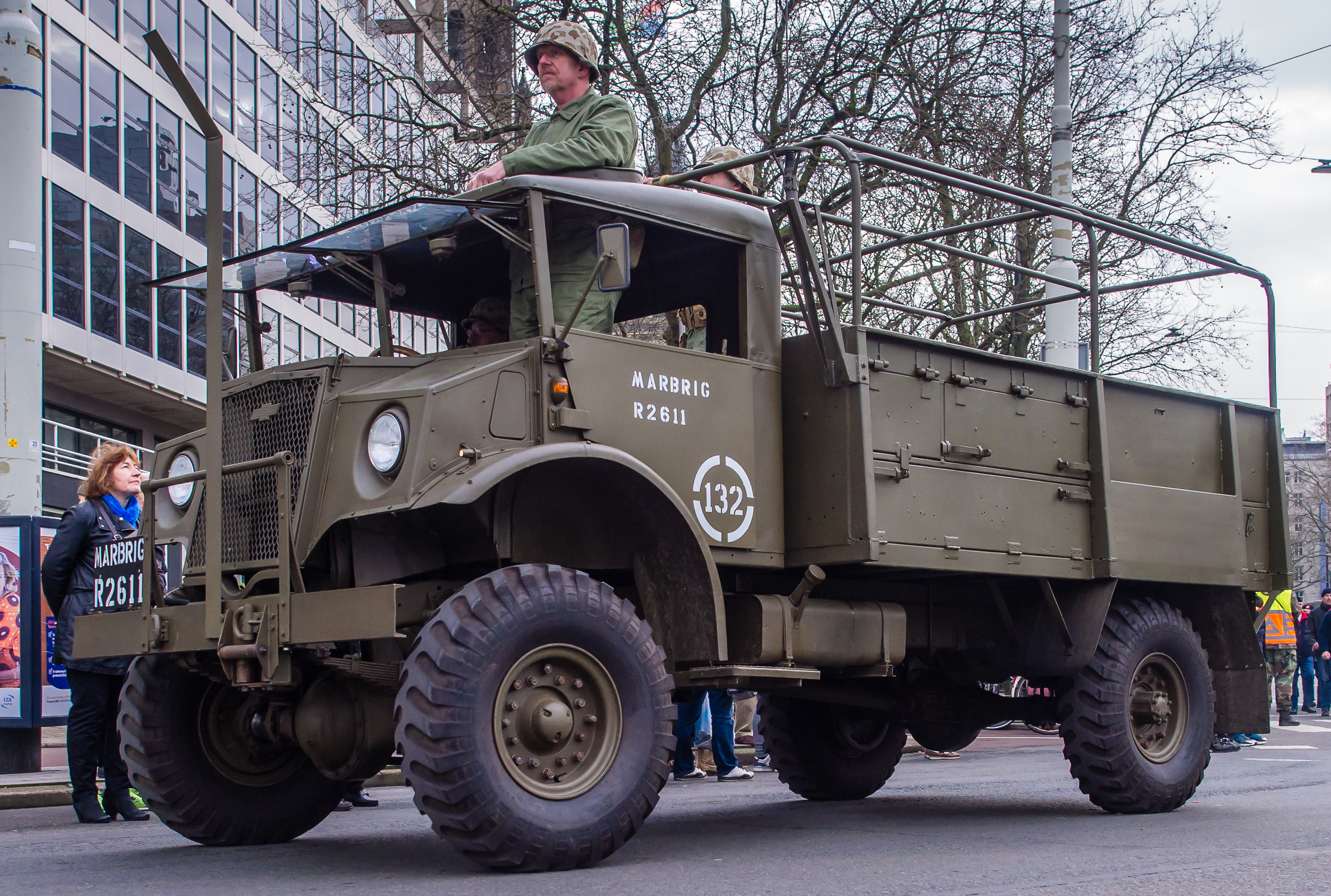
Chevrolet C60L formerly of the Netherlands Marine Corps.

Canadian factories produced around 850,000 vehicles in World War II, including some 50,000 armoured vehicles, self-propelled guns, and tanks. The number of trucks and light wheeled vehicles forms the most significant share as more than 800,000 units were produced by Ford, General Motors, and Chrysler of Canada. Thanks to a large pre-war automotive sector, Canada's was able to build more military trucks than the main Axis nations – Germany, Italy, and Japan – combined, reflecting the demands of mobile warfare in the age of blitzkrieg.

Canada's military truck production focused predominantly on a broad range of medium-rated vehicles. Thus, light jeeps and trucks above 3 tonnes (3.3 short tons) off-road capacity, required by the Canadian Army, were purchased from outside suppliers. Canadian industry production included both modified civilian commercial designs (306,000 of which were classified as "Modified Conventional Pattern" or MCP), as well as dedicated military-purpose designs, built conforming to the Canadian Military Pattern specifications, in roughly equal numbers.

Most CMP trucks were manufactured by the Canadian Chevrolet division of General Motors, and Ford Motor Company of Canada. The two manufacturers quickly ramped up their Canadian production utilizing the reserve production capacity that had remained idle ever since the Great Depression, and through an unusual act of collaboration between the two rival companies — the use of interchangeable components. A smaller number of CMP trucks were assembled from Canadian-made chassis and parts, typically first built on Canadian production lines, then broken (knocked) down, crated, shipped overseas, and re-assembled in Britain, Australia, New Zealand, South Africa (2,600), India (9,500), Italy, and Egypt. Following British convention, CMP trucks had right hand drive even though most of them were built in Canada, which primarily used left-hand drive vehicles. The CMP specification proved versatile, and it formed the basis of a wide variety of different truck types and even some armoured vehicles. There were no less than ninety types of CMP army vehicles on twelve different chassis, including three different types of wireless trucks, four ambulance types, and thirteen field-workshop vehicle types. In Australian service (almost always with the No. 13 cab), the vehicles were known as the "Chev Blitz" or the "Ford Blitz".

Around 410,000 CMP trucks were manufactured in Canada, with GM contributing 201,000 and Ford making the remainder. The most prevalent models were 4x4, 3-ton trucks (common types were the Chevrolet C60S and C60L, and the equivalent Ford F60S and F60L), with just over 209,000 vehicles made. Additionally, Chrysler was enlisted to produce another 180,000 Dodge trucks, just over three quarters of which were 3-ton trucks. These were to also be used in the CMP role, although they differed somewhat from the CMP pattern, being fitted with standard Dodge control cabins, on 2-inch (50 mm) longer wheelbases, and mostly being two-wheel drive. Furthermore, roughly 9,500 additional bare 4x4 CMP chassis were made, mainly for conversion to armoured cars and other vehicles in Allied countries.

Canada's production of CMP trucks alone exceeded the total military truck production of Nazi Germany. The British History of the Second World War (the United Kingdom's official history of the war) argues that the production of soft-skinned trucks, including the CMP truck class, was Canada's most important contribution to the eventual Allied victory.

After 1945, newly manufactured and modified war surplus CMP trucks were used in several European armies (e.g. the Netherlands, Belgium, Denmark, Norway, Portugal, Spain), and around the world (e.g., South Africa, Argentina, Jordan, Pakistan, South Vietnam, and Malaya). CMP trucks were adapted after the war for a variety of civilian roles including forestry, grain transport, fire-fighting, and snowplowing. In Malaysia, after the Malayan Emergency, many CMP trucks were converted to log transporters or off-road trucks at construction sites with upgraded brake systems and more powerful engines.

== Canadian Military Pattern types ==
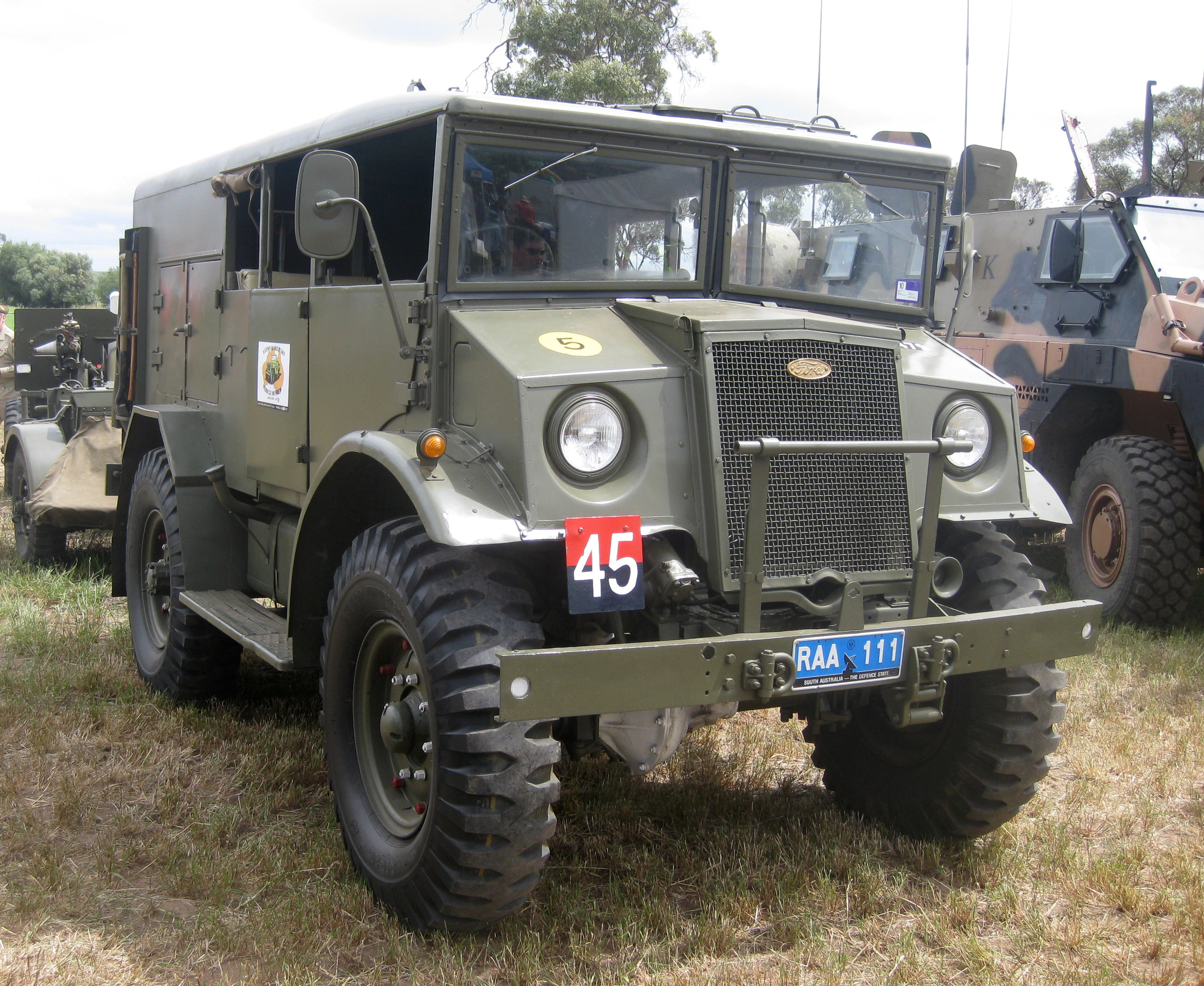
Ford Australia CMP "Blitz" Field Artillery Tractor (FAT) at the National Military Vehicle Museum

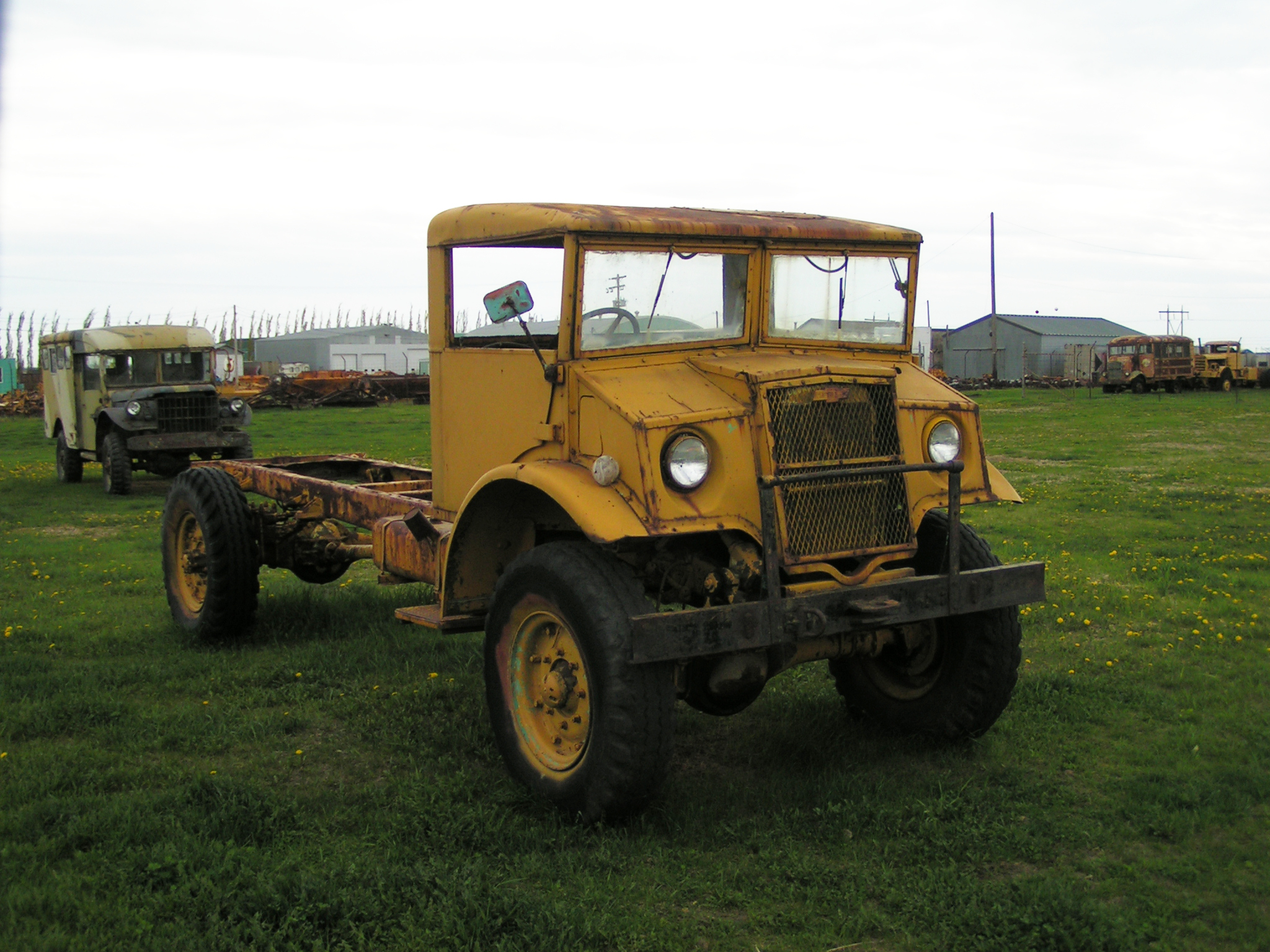
Chevrolet CMP with No.13 cab and chassis

The Ford-built CMP trucks used a 95 bhp (71 kW), 239 cu in (3.9 L) Ford V8 Flathead engine while most of the Chevrolet-built CMP trucks had an 85 bhp (63 kW), 216 cu in (3.5 L), straight-6 overhead-valve Chevrolet engine. An American-made 270 cu in (4.4 L) GMC straight-6 engine powered the C60X 3-ton truck.

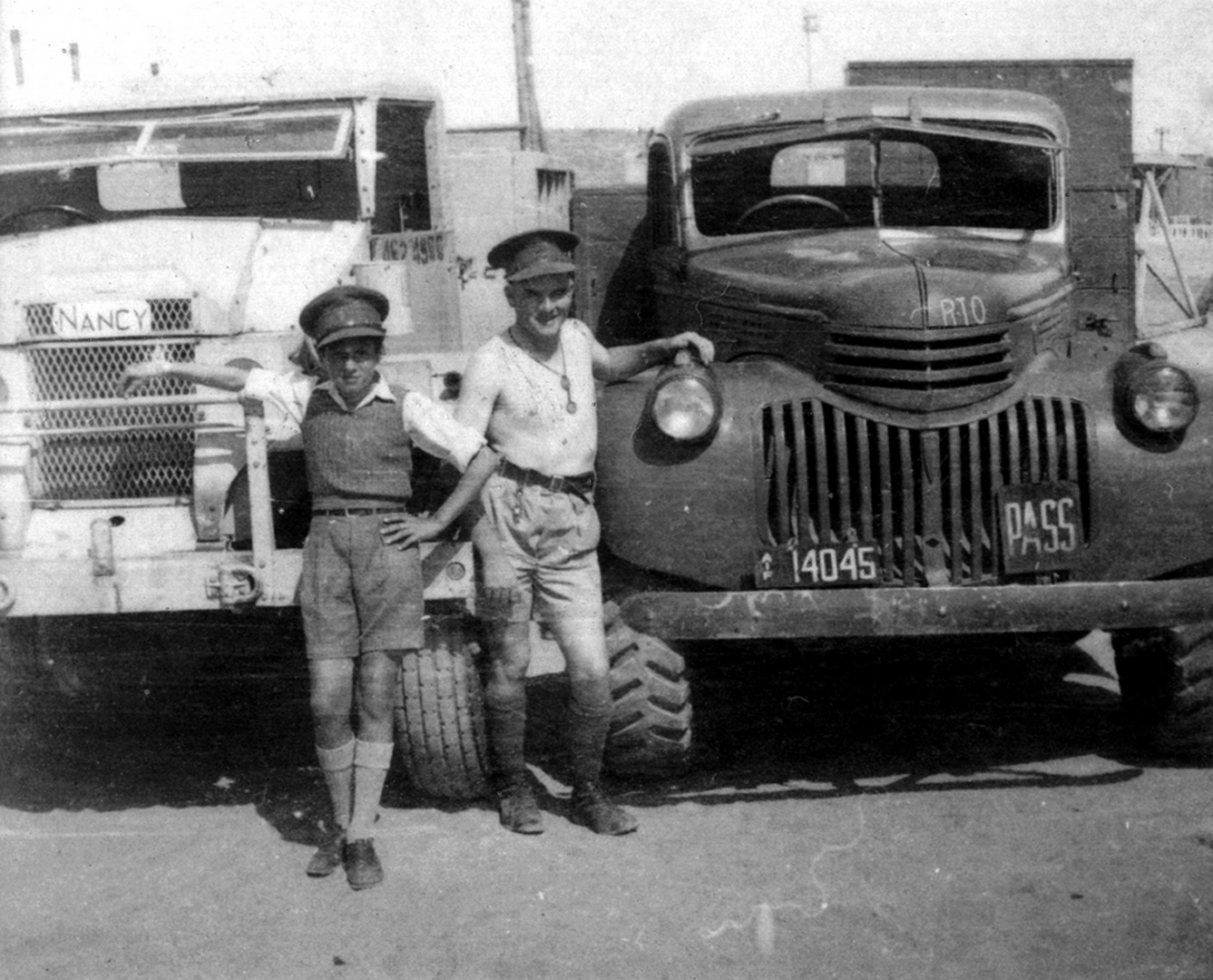
Two early Chevrolet trucks – CMP left and 'Modified Conventional Pattern' on right, 1942.

The Ford and Chevrolet trucks shared a standard cab design, which evolved over the years of production. The first (designed at Ford by Sid Swallow), second and third cab designs were called No. 11, 12 and 13, respectively. The first two types were similar, the main difference being a two-part radiator grille in the No. 12 cab (its upper part was opened with a bonnet, which was known as the "Alligator cab"). The final No. 13 cab, an entirely Canadian design made from late 1941 until the end of the war, had the two flat panes of the windscreen angled slightly downward to minimize the glare from the sun and to avoid causing strong reflections that would be observable from aircraft.

All the CMP cab designs had a short, "cab forward" configuration that gave CMP trucks their distinctive pug-nosed profile. This design was required to meet the British specifications for a compact truck design that would be efficient to transport by ship. The specifications also demanded right-hand drive.

Internally the cab had to accommodate the comparatively large North American engines and it was generally cramped. The standard cabs were then matched up with a variety of standard chassis, drive trains and body designs. Chevrolet-built vehicles could be recognised by the radiator grille mesh being of a diamond pattern, whereas Ford-built ones had grilles formed of a square mesh.

Dodge production started later. Early prototypes used the No. 13 cab, but production vehicles retained a commercial cab and longer conventional control similar to CMP vehicles. This enabled more rapid production, while retaining similar specifications for chassis, drive, and mounting of vehicle rear bodies.

The production of CMP truck bodies in Canada was subcontracted out to smaller companies in Ontario and Manitoba, organized into the wartime "Steel Body Manufacturers Association" by the Department of Munitions and Supply. The wide variety of truck body designs included general service (GS) / troop carrier, fuel / water tanker, vehicle recovery (tow truck), field ambulance, dental clinic, mobile laundry, wireless house (radio HQ), machinery (machine shop / welding station), folding-boat transport, artillery tractor, and anti-tank gun portee.

In the list below, a drive specification of NxM means that the vehicle has a total of N wheels and that M of those wheels are driven. The military specifications did not permit more than two wheels per axle. (Note: This restriction could have several possible benefits. First, a standard axle length would simplify the use of standard loading ramps, partial bridge decks, and bridge decks in which the road bearing girders protrude above the road surface on the top side. Second, the load of trucks of a standard axle length is more directly and safely transmitted down to the longitudinal spans supporting the bridge under the bridge deck by positioning the spans apart to match the standard axle length. Third, allowing only one wheel at each end of an axle would ensure that all wheels would be fast to change. Finally, minimizing the tread width would very slightly reduce a vehicle's vulnerability in minefields while following other vehicles of the same standard axle length.) The British standard load capacities of 8 cwt (400 kg), 15 cwt (760 kg), 30 cwt (1,525 kg) and 60 cwt (3,050 kg) correspond roughly to the American loads of 1/2, 3/4 ton, 1.5, and 3 short tons, respectively. The 60-cwt CMP trucks were usually called 3-ton lorries or trucks (60 cwt being 3 long tons).

=== Chevrolet (General Motors Canada) ===
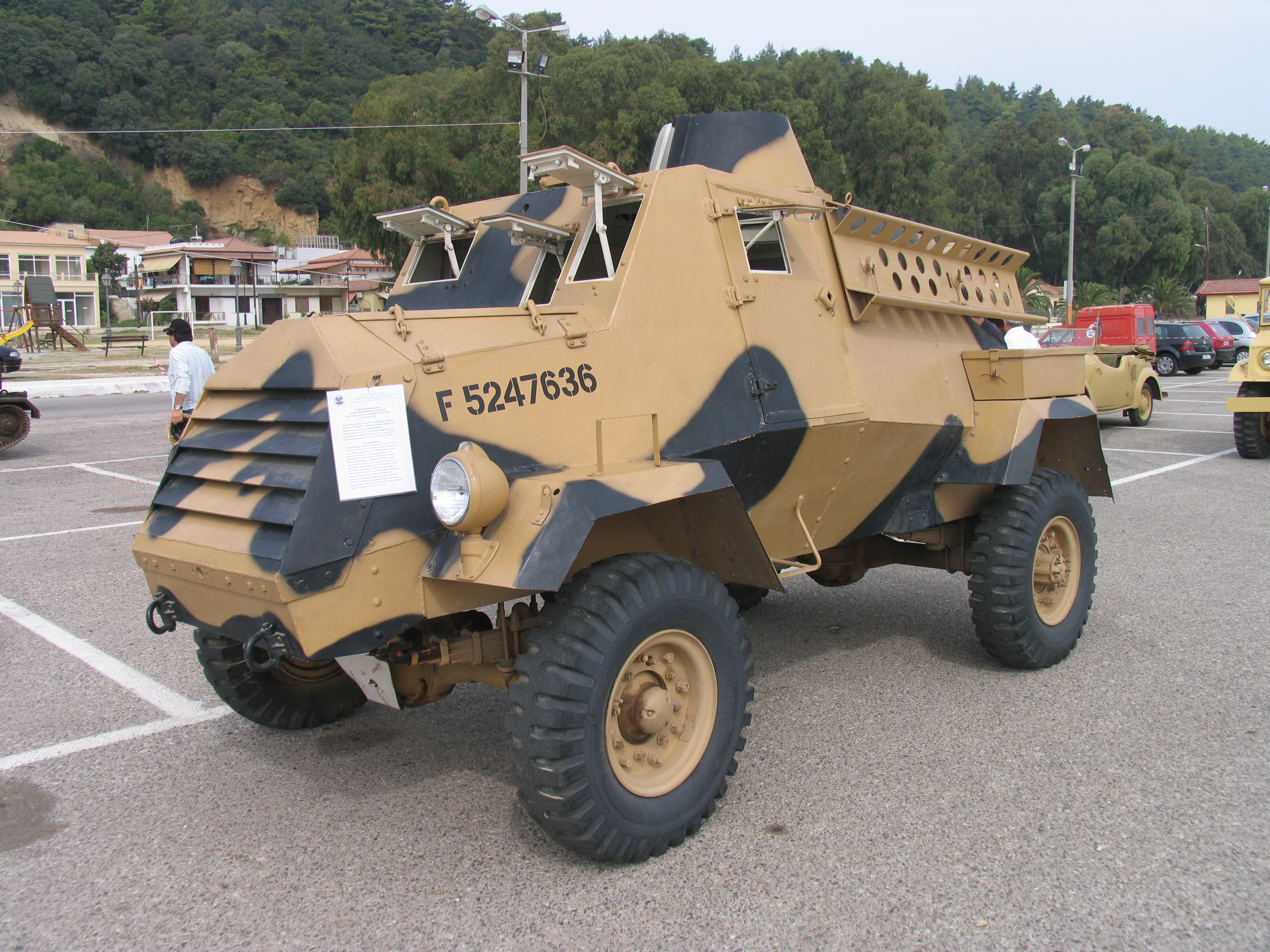
Otter MK1 at Katakolo beach, Greece.

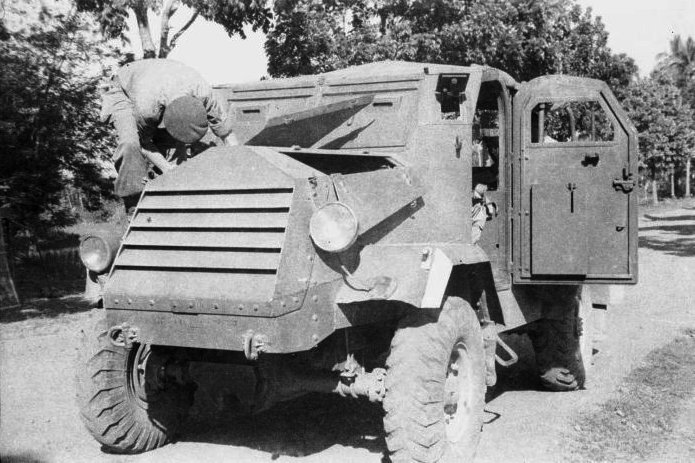
Dutch armoured personnel carrier (GM C15TA) used during the Indonesian Revolution

General Motors Canada CMP trucks
| Model | Drive | Wheelbase | Rating | Notes |
|---|---|---|---|---|
| Chevrolet C8 | 4×2 | 101 in (2.57 m) | 8 cwt | |
| Chevrolet C8A | 4×4 | 101 in (2.57 m) | 8 cwt | Heavy Utility Truck (Note: Produced in Wireless (HUW), Ambulance (HUA), Personnel (HUP), Machinery ZL (mobile radio repair shop) and Computer (accounting, payroll) configurations.) |
| Chevrolet C15 | 4×2 | 101 in (2.57 m) | 15 cwt | |
| Chevrolet C15A | 4×4 | 101 in (2.57 m) | 15 cwt | |
| Chevrolet C15TA | 4×4 | 101 in (2.57 m) | 15 cwt | Armoured truck |
| Chevrolet C30 | 4×4 | 134.25 in (3.41 m) | 30 cwt | |
| Chevrolet C60S | 4×4 | 134.25 in (3.41 m) | 3 ton | "Short" wheelbase variant |
| Chevrolet C60L | 4×4 | 158.25 in (4.02 m) | 3 ton | "Long" wheelbase variant |
| Chevrolet C60X | 6×6 | 160.25 in (4.070 m) +52 in (1.32 m) | 3 ton | 270 cu in GMC straight-6 engine |
| Chevrolet CGT | 4×4 | 101.25 in (2.57 m) | | Field artillery tractor |

As well as trucks, CMP chassis were used for the Fox Armoured Car, the design of the British Humber Armoured Car adapted for production by GM. General Motors Canada built 1,761 Otter Light Reconnaissance Cars, which were an adaption of the Humber Light Reconnaissance Car Mark III for a C15 chassis

=== Ford (Ford Canada) ===
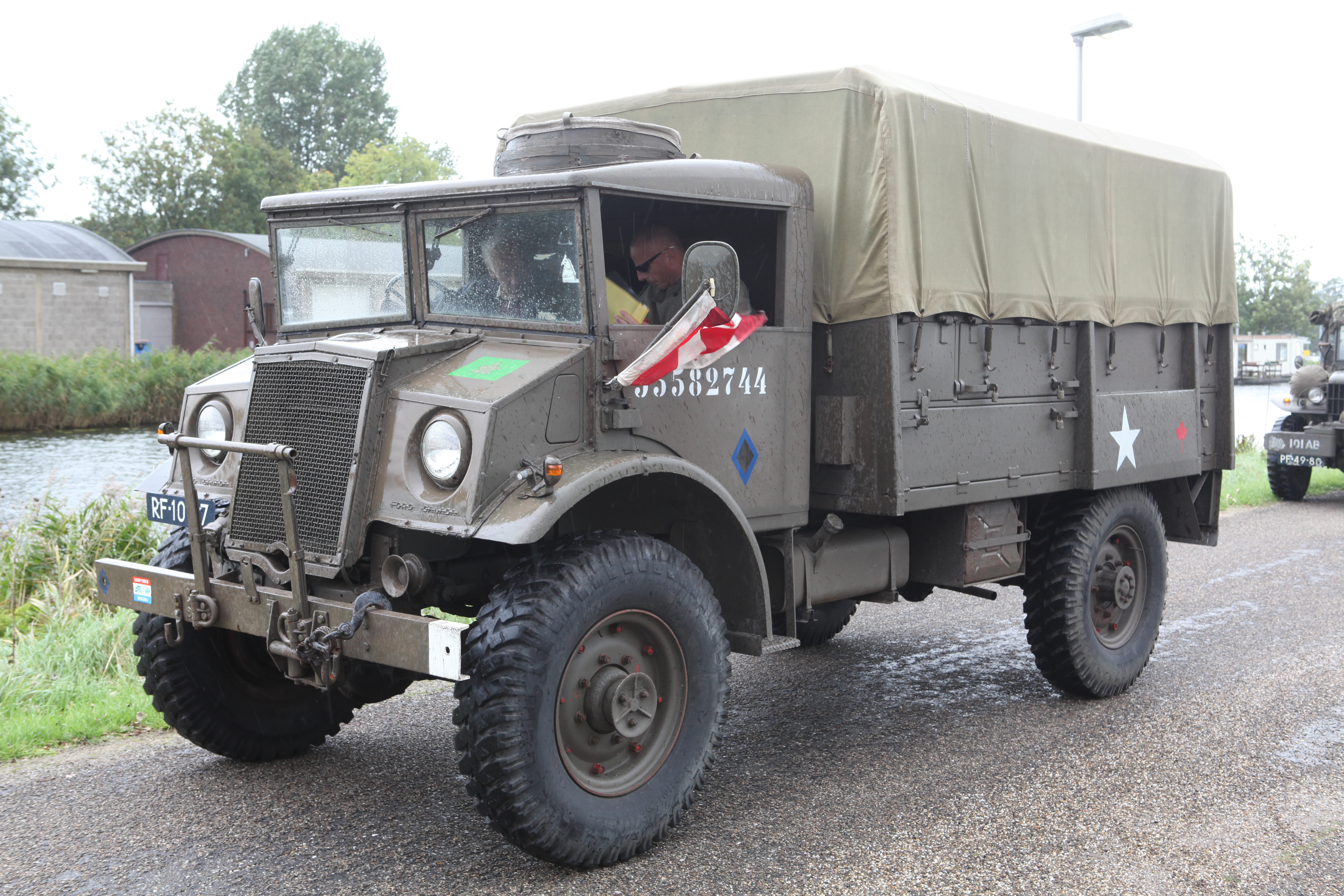
Ford F60S with cargo body

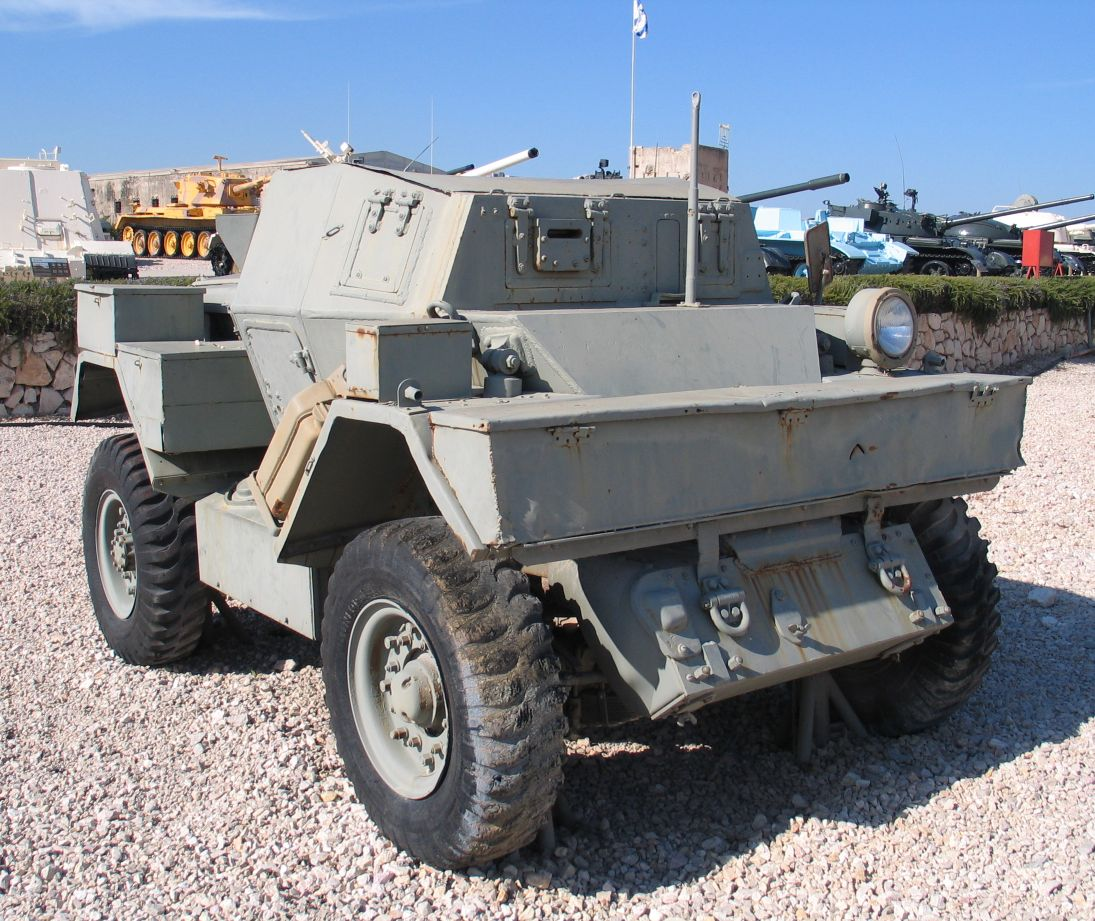
Ford Lynx Mk1 at Israel's Latrun Museum.

Ford Canada CMP trucks
| Model | Drive | Wheelbase | Rating | Notes |
|---|---|---|---|---|
| Ford F8 | 4×2 | 101 in (2.57 m) | 8 cwt | |
| Ford F15 | 4×2 | 101 in (2.57 m) | 15 cwt | |
| Ford F15A | 4×4 | 101 in (2.57 m) | 15 cwt | |
| Ford F30 | 4×4 | 134.25 in (3.41 m) | 30 cwt | |
| Ford F60S | 4×4 | 134.25 in (3.41 m) | 3 ton | "Short" wheelbase variant |
| Ford F60L | 4×4 | 158.25 in (4.02 m) | 3 ton | "Long" wheelbase variant |
| Ford F60T | 4×4 | 115 in (2.92 m) | 3 ton | Tractor unit |
| Ford F60H | 6×4 | 160.25 in (4.070 m) +52 in (1.32 m) | 3 ton | Rear axle undriven |
| Ford FGT | 4×4 | 101.25 in (2.57 m) | | Field artillery tractor |

The Ford Lynx Scout Car, also known as "Car, Scout, Ford Mark I", (4x4, 101-inch wheelbase), was the hull of a Daimler Dingo on a CMP chassis.

=== Dodge (Chrysler Canada) ===
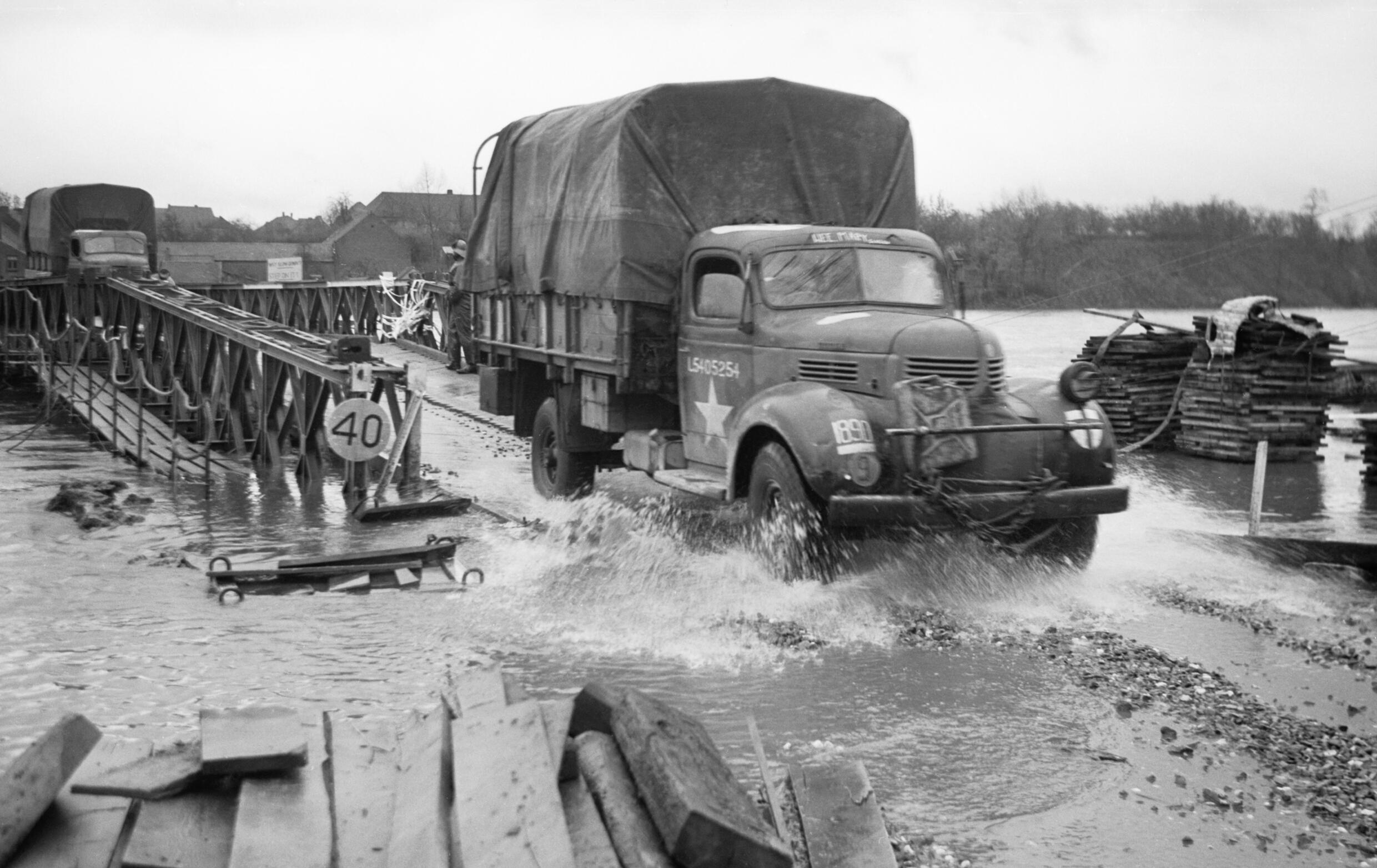
British Dodge D60 supply trucks crossing a Bailey bridge over the river Meuse in full flood. Maaseik on Dutch border, 25 November 1944.

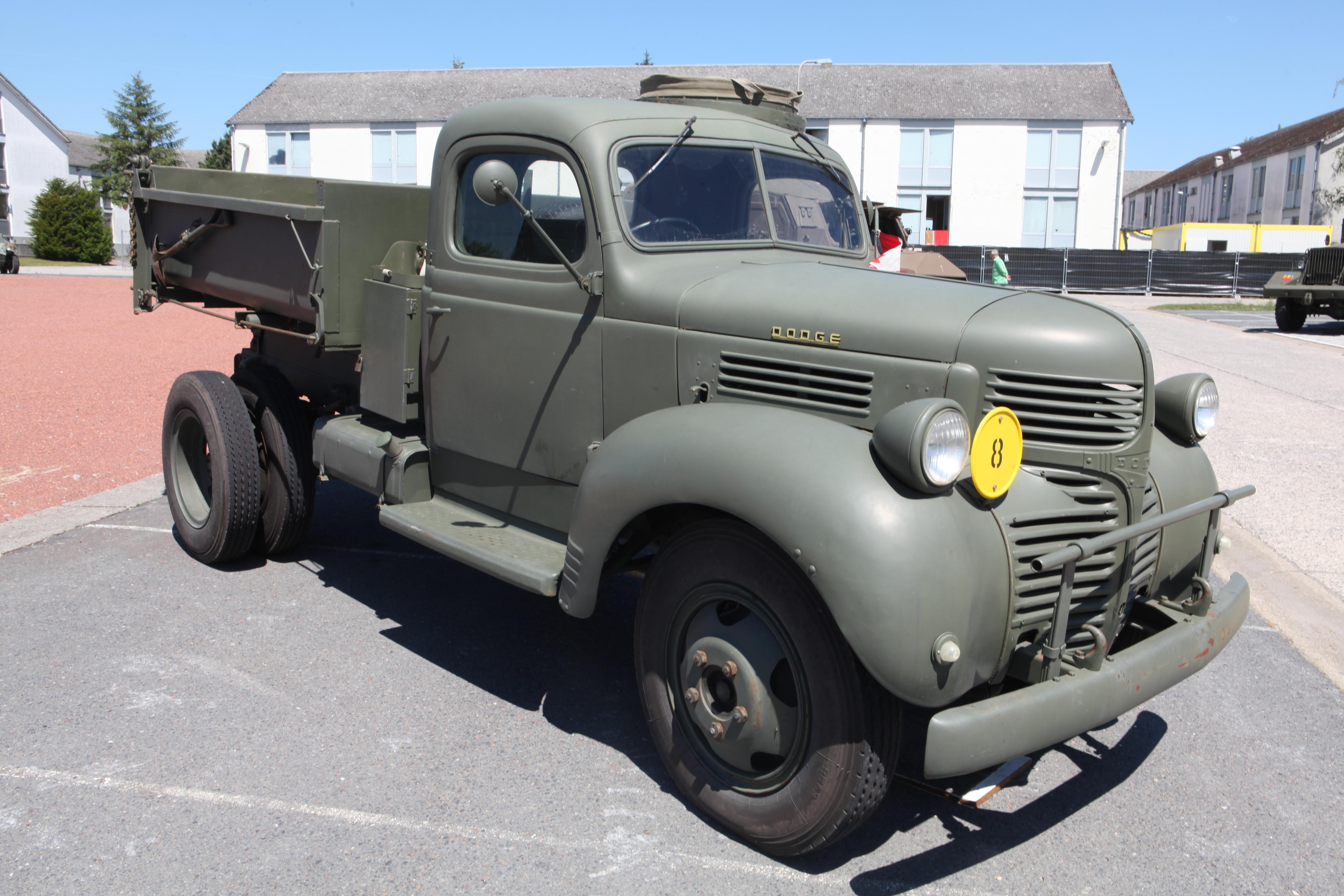
While retaining the Dodge cab, for CMP specification this D15 is right hand drive, standardised rear body, and has a roof hatch.

Chrysler of Canada built about 180,000 Dodge military trucks from 1939 to 1945, mostly for the CMP role, and following the same naming convention. Three quarters of these were 3‑ton models of various D60 (Dodge T-110) types. (Note: Chrysler's internal annual publication of starting and ending serials of all models shows production of 137,127 three‑ton T-110 (D60) variants: 1,500 T110L-S (3-ton SWB), 3,000 T110L-3 (3-ton LWB), 3,000 T110L-4 (3-ton LWB), 80,384 T110L-5 (D60L), 11,670 T110L-6 (D60S), 15,539 T110L-9 (D60L/D), 11,690 T110L-12 (D60L/DD), 5,678 T110L-13 (D60S/DD), 4,666 T110L-14 (3-ton LWB). Plus an additional 43,618 other models: 3,002 T212 (D8A), 28,866 T222 (D15), 11,750 T236 (3/4APT – Canadian WC-52s). A total of 180,745 trucks.)

To achieve a quick increase in production output of trucks providing equal functionality, it was deemed acceptable for the Dodges to forgo the standardized cab used on Fords and Chevrolets; and like the other two automakers, Dodge fitted its own engines. Although regular Dodge cabs were fitted, they were right hand drive (except for those for Canadian domestic use) and had a gunner's hatch in the roof. Initial production D60s had 8.25x20 tires and dual rear wheels; they were subsequently switched over to the larger CMP-specification 10.50x16 size and axles with single rear wheels, as well as being fitted with British-pattern rear bodies. Operator's and technical manuals for the Dodges also mirrored the Ford and GM CMP manuals. Most of Dodge's models were two-wheel drive, with a high and low-range rear axle. Only the 3,000 Dodge WC-1 (T-207)–based D8As and 11,750 units of the 3/4 APT ('Air Portable'; T-236), Canadian-built versions of the 3/4‑ton WC-52 were equipped with four-wheel drive.

All Dodges were powered by the Chrysler straight-six flathead gasoline engines – the D60 models' 236 cu in (3,870 cm^{3}) engine delivered 95 hp (71 kW) at 3,600 rpm.

Dodge trucks
| Model | Drive | Wheelbase | Rating | Notes |
|---|---|---|---|---|
| Dodge D8A | 4×4 | | 8 cwt | |
| Dodge D15 | 4×2 | 128.5 in (3.26 m) | 15 cwt | |
| Dodge D60S | 4×2 | 136 in (3.45 m) | 60-cwt | Short wheelbase |
| Dodge D60S/DD | 4×2 | 136 in (3.45 m) | 60 cwt | Short wheelbase, dual rear tyres |
| Dodge D60L | 4×2 | 160 in (4.06 m) | 60 cwt | Long wheelbase |
| Dodge D60L/D | 4×2 | 160 in (4.06 m) | 60 cwt | Long wheelbase |
| Dodge D60L/DD | 4×2 | 160 in (4.06 m) | 60 cwt | Long wheelbase, dual rear tyres |

The initial 60 cwt (3-ton) Dodge types (engineering codes T110L-S, T110L-3, T110L-4, as well as the later T110L-14) were not formally D60s, (Note: Initial units came with smaller wheels and tires, and dual rear wheels,) leaving 124,961 (91% of the 3‑ton trucks) with a CMP-type name-code (based on serial numbers). Including the D8As and D15 units, a total of 156,829 (87%) of Canada's Dodge trucks received a CMP type-code.

The D3/4 APT (for 'Air Portable') was based on the U.S. Dodge WC-52, but was powered by a 25 in (64 cm) long engine-block, like the 3‑tonners, rated at 92 1/2 bhp (69.0 kW). The first batch of 5,000 (Note: (serial nrs. 91,151,283 to 91,156,282)) were 6 ft 11 1/8 in (2.11 m) wide, but this presented an issue with their air-portability, so the second batch of 6,750 (Note: {serial nrs. 91,166,034 to 91,172,783)) were built with narrower beds of 6 ft 5 1/8 in (1.96 m) width. Winch capacity of the D3/4 was 7,500 lb (3,400 kg) The first, wider batch were also referred to as 2M1A, and the second, narrower series as the 2M2A.

== Outside Canada ==
Chassis and vehicle production was licensed to Australia, allowing local production, while other vehicles were shipped to Britain in part-assembled "knocked down" form. These were delivered as kits, and had final assembly in factories in Britain. Air-portable versions had the top half of the cab superstructure and exterior components stowed — to allow the vehicles to fit in the hold of transport aircraft — and could easily be re-fitted on receipt in theatre.

Bare chassis were created for alternative bodies to be fitted, reducing the shipping requirement to India. Bodies for these vehicles were locally produced in India from available materials, frequently built entirely from wood, creating a diverse range of "Indian Pattern" vehicles.

To meet the pressing demand for military vehicles during World War II, several Commonwealth countries designed light armoured vehicles based on Canadian-made CMP chassis. Special chassis were created to aid in this purpose, featuring rear mounted engines and central steering positions. Armoured cars used these or standard chassis depending on design and availability.

List of CMP-based vehicles outside Canada
| Manufacturer | Vehicle | Chassis | Drive | Wheelbase | Notes |
|---|---|---|---|---|---|
| Ruskin Motor Bodies; Ford Australia | Rover Mk I | Ford F60L | 4×4 | 158.25 in (4.02 m) | |
| Ruskin Motor Bodies; Ford Australia | Rover Mk II | Ford F60S | 4×4 | 134.25 in (3.41 m) | |
| General Motors; Holden Ltd | Rhino AC | | 4×4 | 101 in (2.57 m) | Prototype only |
| General Motors; Holden Ltd | 6×6 Heavy AC | | 6×6 | 158 in (4.01 m) | Design only |
| TATA Engineering and Locomotive Company | ACV-IP | | 4×4 | 101 in (2.57 m) | Most used CMP chassis |
| | SARC (Note: Short for South African Reconnaissance Car.) | | 4×4 | Various | |
| Hutt Workshops | Beaverette (NZ) AC | | 4×2 | | |
| | C8AX "Puddlejumper" | Chevrolet C8A | 4×4 | 101 in (2.57 m) | Created in New Zealand. |

== See also ==
- List of military equipment of the Canadian Army during the Second World War
- CMP FAT
- Morris C8 Field Artillery Tractor
- Military history of Canada during the Second World War
