= Otter light reconnaissance car =

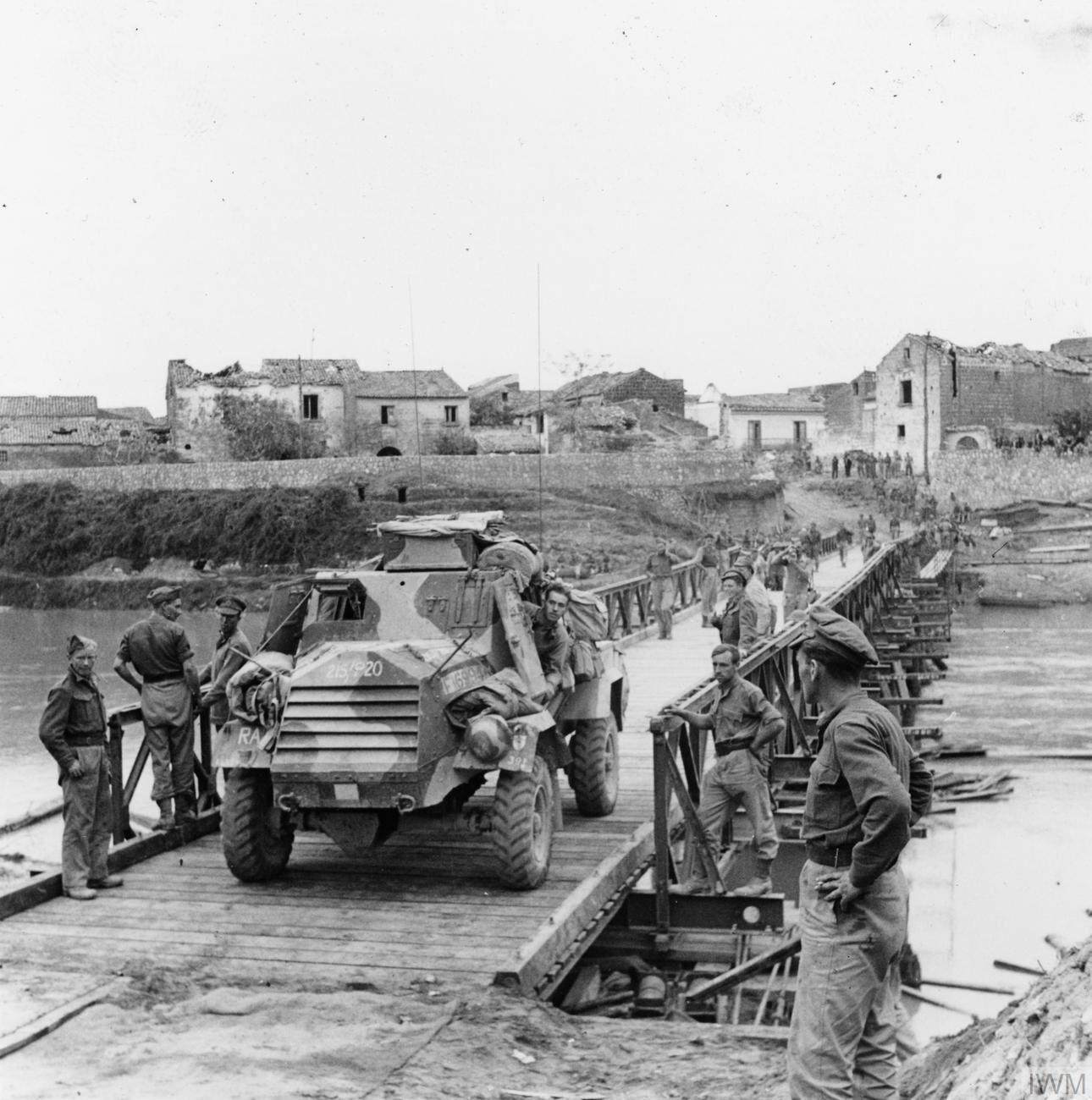
- An Otter crossing a Bailey bridge over the Volturno river at Grazzanise in October 1943
- Type: Light reconnaissance car
- Place of origin: Canada

Service history
- Wars: World War II; Greek Civil War; Indonesian National Revolution; 1948 Arab–Israeli War

Production history
- Designed: 1942
- Manufacturer: General Motors Canada

Specifications
- Mass: 4.44 t (4.37 long tons; 4.89 short tons)
- Length: 4.50 m (14 ft 9 in)
- Width: 2.16 m (7 ft 1 in)
- Height: 2.44 m (8 ft 0 in)
- Crew: 3
- Armour: up to 12 mm
- Main armament: .55 in Boys anti-tank rifle
- Secondary armament: 0.303 in (7.7 mm) Bren light machine gun
- Engine: GMC 6 cyl. gasoline 106 hp (79 kW)
- Power/weight: 24.1 hp/tonne
- Suspension: 4 x 4 wheel, leaf spring
- Maximum speed: 75 km/h (47 mph)

The Otter light reconnaissance car, known officially by the British as "Car, Light Reconnaissance, Canadian GM (R.A.C.)", was a light armoured car produced in Canada during the Second World War for British and Commonwealth forces.

== History ==
The Otter light reconnaissance car (LRC) was developed by General Motors Canada to meet the demand for this type of armoured car. The design followed the layout of the British Humber Mark III LRC.

== Design ==
The Otter was based on the Chevrolet C15 Canadian Military Pattern truck chassis and used many standard GM components. It took a crew of three – driver and commander seated in the vehicle front, while the gunner occupied the turret position at the rear. A Wireless Set No. 19 was mounted in the rear with A and B set aerials extending from the rear of the fighting compartment on mounting arms.

The primary armament consisted of a hull-mounted Boys anti-tank rifle and a Bren light machine gun in a small open-topped turret. A smoke discharger is mounted alongside the mounting for the Boy's anti-tank rifle.

Although it used a more powerful engine than the Humber, it was larger and heavier (by a ton); overall performance was less than that of the Humber but still acceptable.

== Production ==
Between 1942 and 1945, 1,761 units were produced in Oshawa, Ontario, though fewer than 1,000 were delivered overseas.

== Service history ==
=== World War II ===
The Otter served with Canadian units in the Italian campaign and Northwest European operations. It was also employed by the South African Army and the British RAF Regiment. Some RAF regiment vehicles used aircraft armament such as 20mm cannon and 0.303 Browning machine guns.

=== Post-war service ===
After the war, the Otter was used by the Jordanian Army during the First Arab-Israeli War and the Dutch Army during the Indonesian Revolution. The Syrian Army also operated the type after the war, with turretless Otters armed with 7.5 mm FM 24/29 light machine gun in pintle mounts or with a 37 mm Puteaux SA 18 cannon in a turret taken from other British-built armoured cars.

== Variants ==
- Car, Light Reconnaissance, Canadian, G.M. Mark 1(R.A.C.) with a turret.
- Car, Light Reconnaissance, Canadian, G.M. Mark 2 (R.A.C.) without a turret.

== Operators ==
- Canada
- Greece – used by the Greek Army.
- Netherlands – used by the Dutch Army.
- Jordan – used by the Jordanian Army.
- Syria – used by the Syrian Army.
- United Kingdom – used by the RAF Regiment.
- Union of South Africa – used by the South African Defence Force (SADF).

=== Non-state operators ===
- Arab Liberation Army (ALA)
- Haganah

== Surviving vehicles ==
- The Karl Smith Collection in Tooele, Utah.
- The RAF Regiment Museum, Honington.
- Hellenic Historical Vehicles Preservation Club, Greece,
- Fort Nieuw Amsterdam Open Air Museum, Surinam.

== Gallery ==
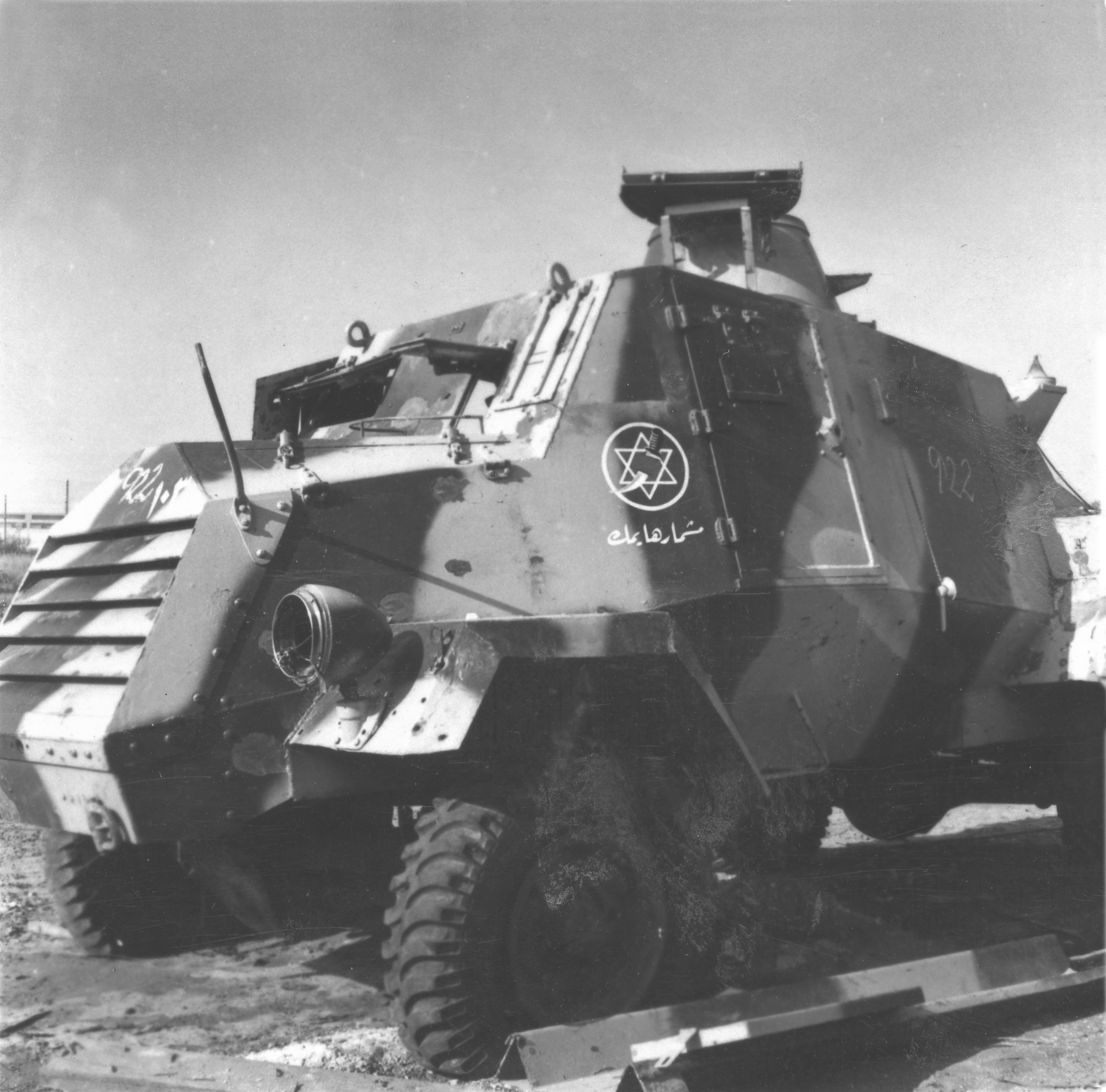
Otter armoured car captured by the Haganah from the Arab Liberation Army in 1948.

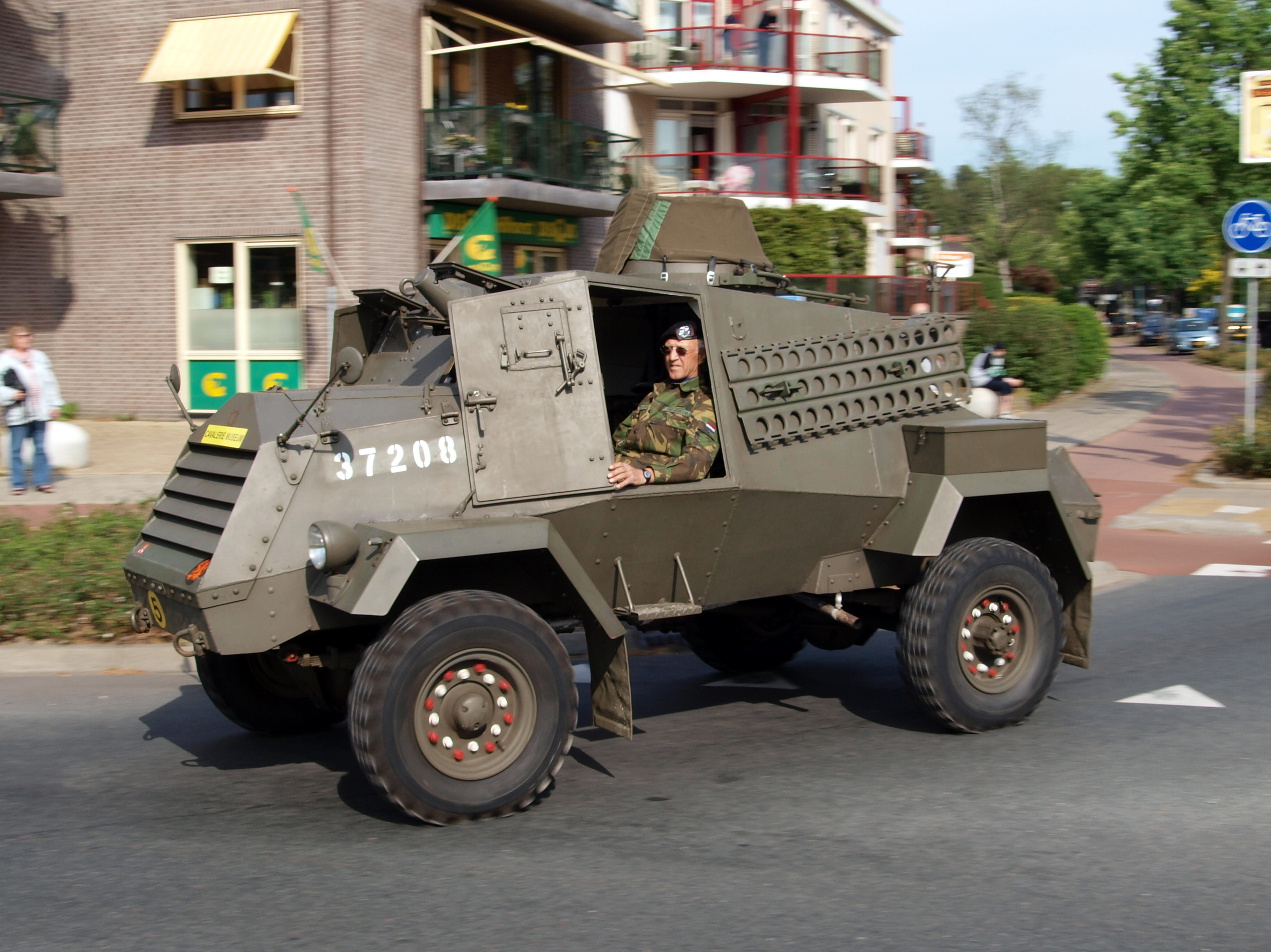
GMC Otter light reconnaissance car, Bridgehead 2011

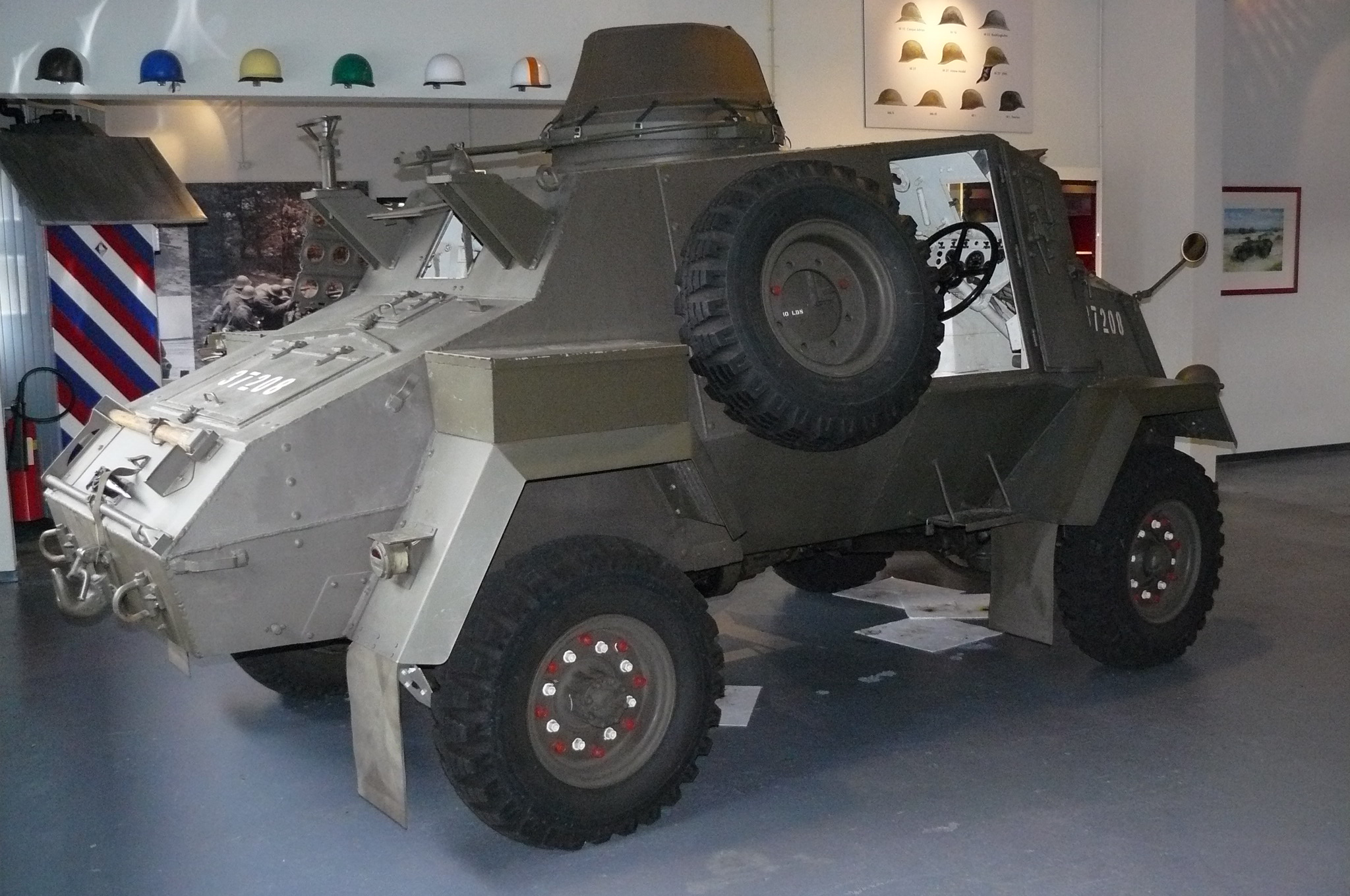
Otter at the Amersfoort Cavalry Museum

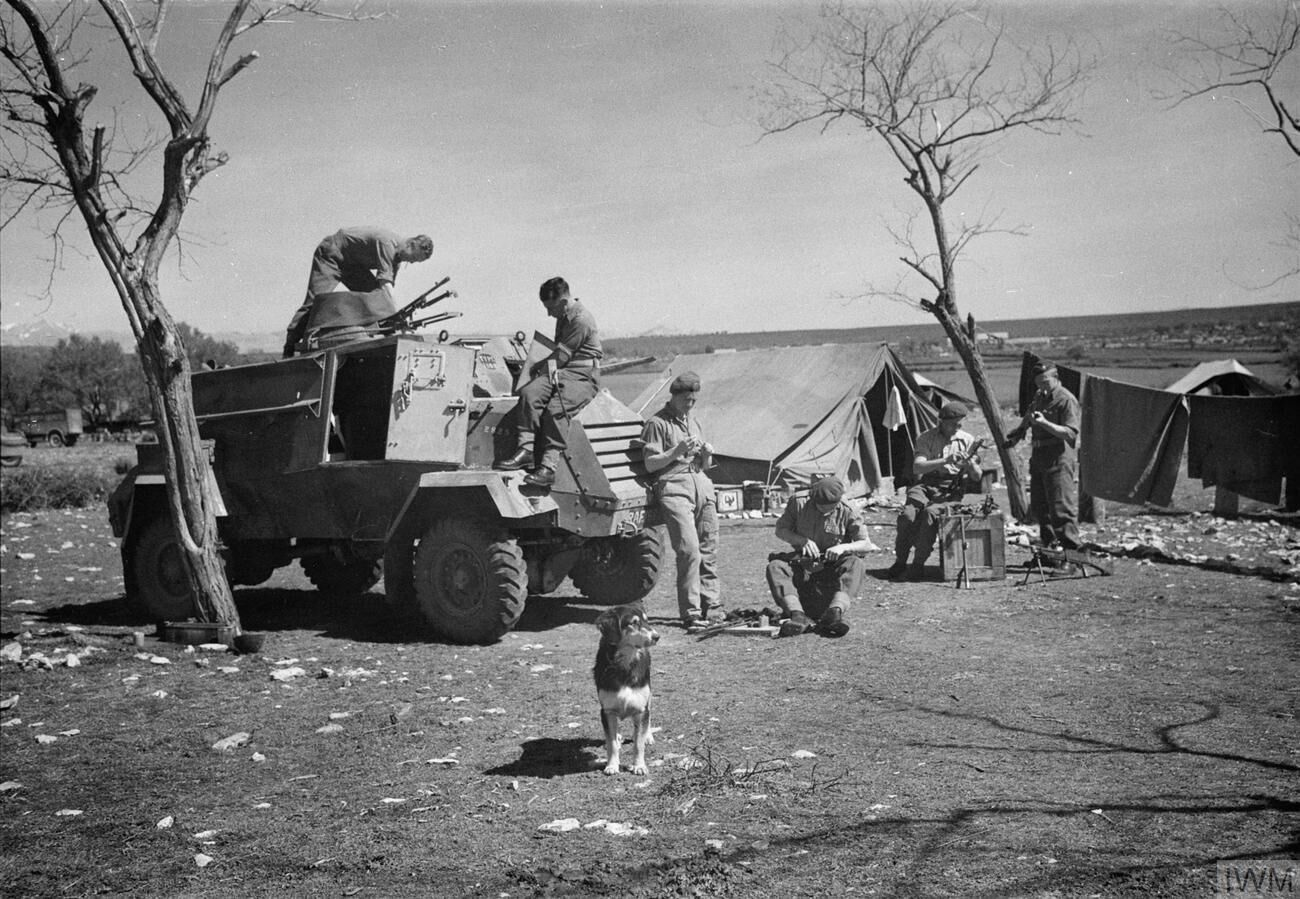
RAF Regiment Otter at Prkos Airfield

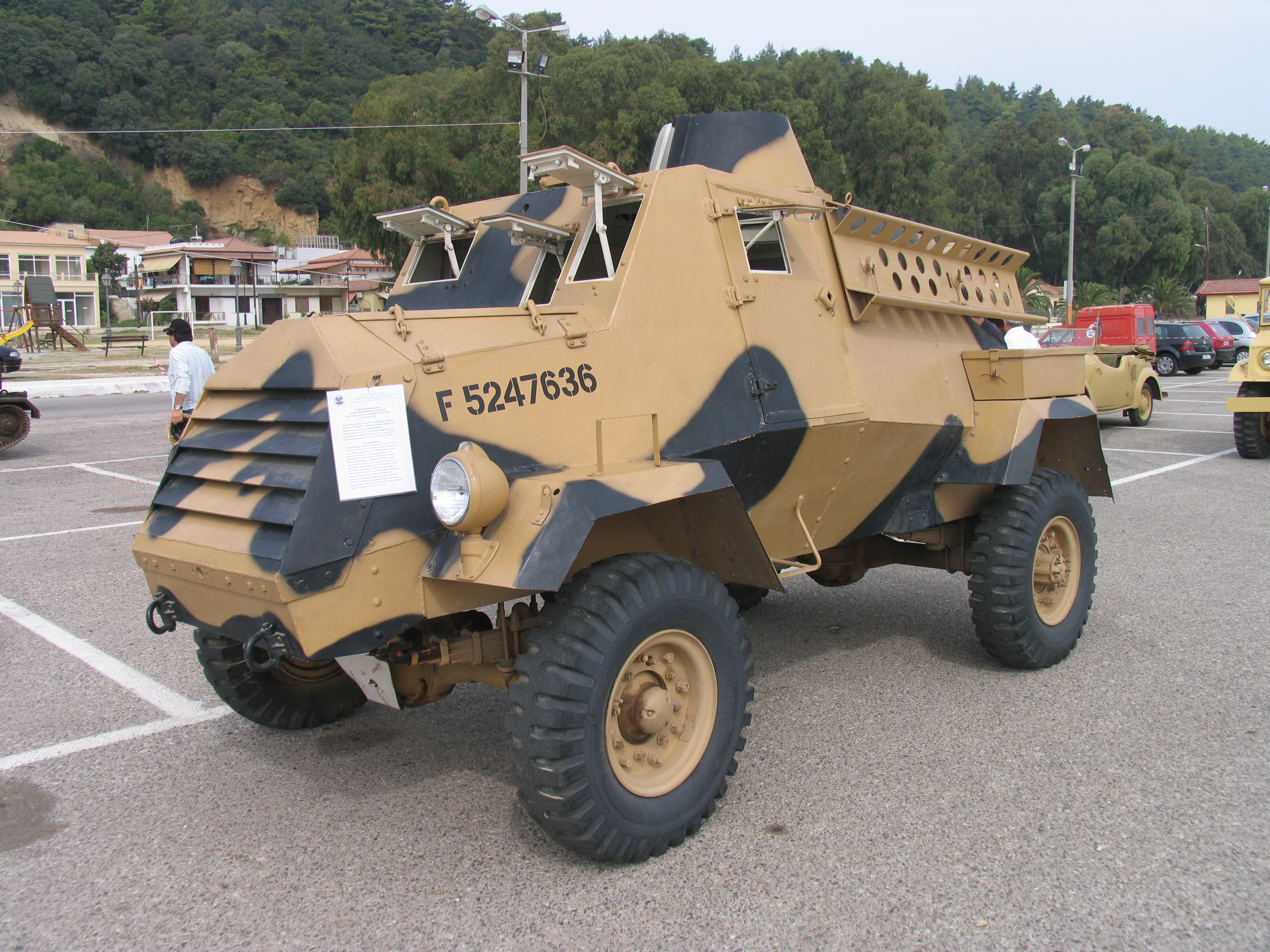
Otter MK1 at Katakolo beach, Greece. This image was taken at the place where Otters landed at on 24 September 1944. The vehicle itself is part of the Hellenic Historical Vehicles Preservation Club collection in Greece. (www.sdio.gr)

== See also ==
- C15TA armoured truck
- Canadian Military Pattern truck
