= Light tank Mk VIII =

Tank, Light, Mk VIII, Harry Hopkins (A25)
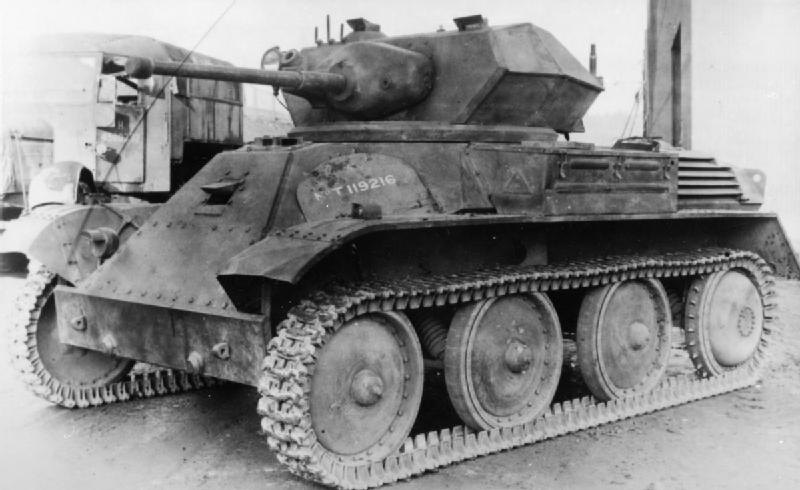
- Mk VIII light tank 'Harry Hopkins'
- Type: Light tank
- Place of origin: United Kingdom

Production history
- Designer: Vickers-Armstrongs
- Manufacturer: Metro-Cammell
- Produced: 1943–1945
- No. built: 100
- Variants: Alecto (SPG)

Specifications
- Mass: 19,040 pounds (8.64 t)
- Length: 4.34 m (14 ft 3 in)
- Width: 2.69 m (8 ft 10 in)
- Height: 2.11 m (6 ft 11 in)
- Crew: 3 (commander, driver, gunner)
- Armour: 17–38 mm (0.67–1.50 in)
- Main armament: Ordnance QF 2 pounder 50 rounds
- Secondary armament: 7.92 mm Besa machine gun 2,025 rounds
- Engine: 149-hp Meadows 12 cyl. petrol engine 148 hp (110 kW)
- Power/weight: 17.4 hp/tonne
- Suspension: Steerable road wheels
- Operational range: 125 miles (201 km)
- Maximum speed: 30 miles per hour (48 km/h)

The light tank Mk VIII (A25), also known as the Harry Hopkins, after American President Roosevelt's chief diplomatic advisor, and A25 from its General staff specification number, was a British light tank produced by Vickers-Armstrongs during the Second World War. The Mk VIII was the last in the line of light tanks the company had built for the British Army, and was intended to be the successor of the previous light tank designed by Vickers-Armstrongs, the Mk VII Tetrarch. A number of changes were made to the Mk VIII, most notably increasing its width, length and weight and also increasing the thickness of the armour. The design of the tank was submitted to the War Office in late 1941, with an initial order for 1,000 models being made by the Tank Board of the War Office in the same month, a number that increased to 2,410 in November. Production began in June 1942 but immediately began encountering problems with the tank, and a number of modifications had to be made to the design after complaints were made by the War Office and the Fighting Vehicle Proving Establishment. These problems were so acute that only 6 tanks had been produced by mid-1943, and only 100 when production ended in February 1945.

By mid-1941, officials in the War Office and the British Army had taken the decision that light tanks were no longer to be used by the British Army due to their inferior weapons and armour, as well as their poor performance during the conflict. Consequently, the Mk VIII was obsolete by the time that any significant number of the tanks had been produced, and none ever saw combat. A number of plans were made by the War Office for the design in light of this decision, including equipping reconnaissance units with them, or the unsuccessful idea of attaching wings to them so that aircraft could tow them as gliders into position to support airborne forces; eventually it was decided to hand over those tanks that had been built to the Royal Air Force for use in airfield defence. One variant on the Mk VIII was designed, the Alecto self-propelled gun which was to have mounted a howitzer and used as a close-support vehicle by airborne forces; however only a few were ever produced and they were never used in combat.

== Development history ==
The Mk VIII was the light tank designed by Vickers-Armstrongs to be the successor to the Mk VII Tetrarch for the British Army. The company intended that the Mk VIII would improve on the design of the Tetrarch in a number of areas, particularly that of armour protection. It had thicker armour than the Tetrarch, with the frontal hull and turret armour being increased to a thickness of 38 millimetres (1.5 in) and the side armour to 17 millimetres (0.67 in), and the turret and hull were given more sloping surfaces than the Tetrarch to help deflect shells. The dimensions of the Tetrarch design were also changed, with the Mk VIII being longer by 6 inches (0.15 m), wider by 1 foot 3 inches (0.38 m) and its weight being increased; these alterations meant that the tank could no longer be air-portable, as it was too heavy to be carried by the General Aircraft Hamilcar glider.

The same 12-cylinder engine as in the Tetrarch was fitted to the Mk VIII, although the increased weight meant that its maximum speed decreased to 30 miles per hour (48 km/h). The armament remained the same as the Tetrarch's: one machine-gun and a 2-pounder (40 mm [1.6 in]) main gun. The tank also kept the unusual steering system used in the Tetrarch design; this steering and mechanical system accomplished turns by the lateral movement of road wheels, which bowed the tracks. When the driver turned the steering wheel all eight road wheels not only turned but also tilted in order to bend the tracks and make the tank turn; the idea was to reduce the mechanical strain and waste of power caused by the traditional system used to turn tanks by braking one track. Unlike the Tetrarch, the steering system of the Mk VIII was power-assisted.

Vickers-Armstrongs submitted the Mk VIII design to the War Office in September 1941, and in that same month the Tank Board of the War Office ordered 1,000 tanks, increased in November to 2,410. The Board hoped that production could commence in June 1942 at a rate of approximately 100 per month, to be produced by Metro-Cammell, a subsidiary of Vickers-Armstrongs. It was also at this time that the tank was given the specification number A25 and given the name of Harry Hopkins. Production began in June 1942 as expected, but immediately began to experience problems; these are not specified, but it appears that testing of the prototypes of the Mk VIII provided by Vickers-Armstrongs raised a number of issues. A minute sent to the Prime Minister, Winston Churchill, in September from the Ministry of Supply stated that there would be delays in delivery of the tank due to developmental problems, and a report issued by the War Office in December stated that a number of modifications would be required before production could be continued; the front suspension system was singled out as requiring extensive modification. Problems were still being encountered in July 1943, with a report from the Fighting Vehicle Proving Establishment indicating that serious defects were still being found in the models being tested; the problems became so acute that trials of the Mk VIII were abandoned earlier than scheduled. By 31 August 1943 only six Mk VIII tanks had been produced, compared to a War Office requirement of 100 by the beginning of the year. Although the War Office persisted in retaining the design and issued an official requirement in November 1943 for 750 tanks to be built, only around 100 had been built when production officially ended in February 1945.

== Operational history ==
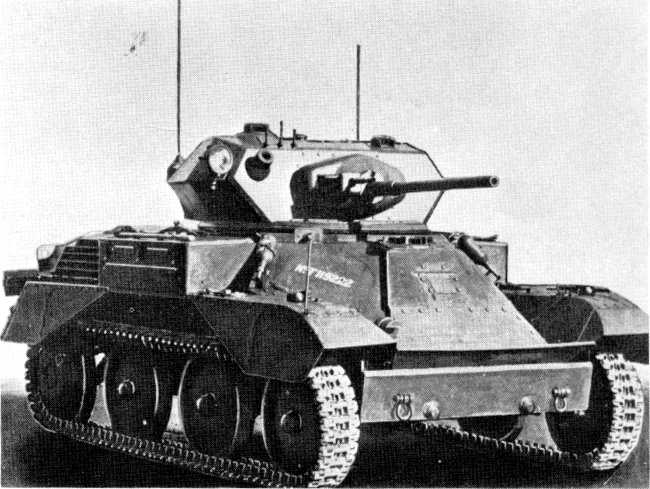
Mk VIII light tank

By mid-1941 officials at the War Office and in the Army had finally decided that light tanks as a concept were a liability, and too vulnerable to be used by the British Army. This was due to the poor performance of British light tanks during the Battle of France, caused when a shortage of tanks designed to engage enemy tanks had led to light tanks being deployed against German armour; the resulting high casualties led to the War Office rethinking the suitability of the light tank design. The pre-war role of the light tank, that of reconnaissance, had also been found to be better carried out by scout cars which had smaller crews and better cross-country abilities. Consequently, by the time that significant numbers of the Mk VIII were being produced by Metro-Cammell, they had already become obsolete and did not see combat. There was a requirement for a limited number of light tanks within the organization of British armoured divisions, but this had already been met by the American-produced M5 Stuart light tank. A policy report issued in December 1942 suggested that the tank could be issued to reconnaissance regiments or special light tank regiments raised for specialized operations. These suggestions were discussed and discarded, and instead it was decided that those tanks built should be handed over to the Royal Air Force for use in defending airfields and airbases.

The Mk VIII was also discussed in terms of another plan known as the Carrier Wing; in this plan flying surfaces, such as wings, would be fitted to the Mk VIII so that it could be towed by a transport aircraft and then glide into battle in support of airborne forces. The plan was dropped, however, after the prototype crashed after it had taken off.

A single variant of the Mk VIII was designed, the Alecto self-propelled gun. Originally known as the Harry Hopkins 1 CS (for "Close Support"), the Alecto was eventually given the General Staff specification number A25 E2. The Alecto mounted a 95-millimetre (3.7 in) howitzer on a lightweight version of the Mk VIII chassis which had the turret removed so that the howitzer could be placed low down in the hull, and the armour was reduced to a thickness of 10 to 4 mm (0.39 to 0.16 in) to reduce its weight, resulting in a maximum speed of 31 miles per hour (50 km/h). The Alecto was designed to replace the half-tracks carrying support weapons, such as howitzers, which British airborne formations used during the conflict, and was first developed in late 1942. It could also have been used in place of 75 mm gun equipped armoured cars. The War Office had ordered 2,200 Alectos but only a small number were ever produced, none of which saw service; many were converted into bulldozers for use by Royal Engineer units.
