= Mk VII Tetrarch light tank =

British light tank

Light tank Mk VII, Tetrarch
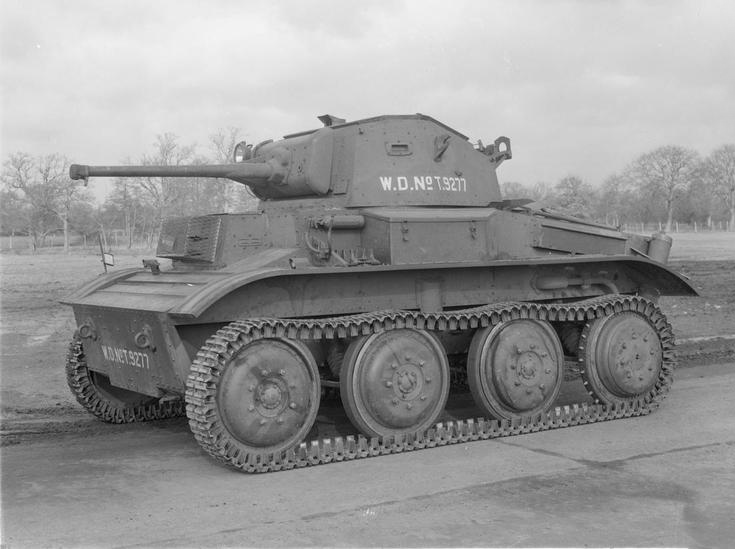
- Mk VII 'Tetrarch'
- Type: Light tank
- Place of origin: United Kingdom

Service history
- Used by: United Kingdom; Soviet Union
- Wars: Second World War

Production history
- Designer: Vickers-Armstrongs
- Designed: 1938
- Manufacturer: Metro-Cammell
- Produced: 1938–1942
- No. built: 100–177
- Variants: Tetrarch I CS, Tetrarch DD

Specifications
- Mass: 16,800 pounds (7,600 kg)
- Length: 13 ft 6 in (4.11 m)
- Width: 7 ft 7 in (2.31 m)
- Height: 6 ft 11 in (2.12 m)
- Crew: 3 (Commander, gunner, driver)
- Armour: 14 mm maximum
- Main armament: QF 2 pounder (40 mm); 50 rounds
- Secondary armament: 7.92 mm Besa machine gun 2,025 rounds
- Engine: Meadows MAT H12 petrol 165 hp (123 kW)
- Power/weight: 21.7 hp (16.2 kW) per ton
- Suspension: Coil spring
- Operational range: 140 miles (230 km)
- Maximum speed: 40 miles per hour (64 km/h), off–road 28 miles per hour (45 km/h)

The light tank Mk VII (A17), also known as the Tetrarch, was a British light tank produced by Vickers-Armstrongs in the late 1930s and used during the Second World War. The Tetrarch was the latest in the line of light tanks built by the company for the British Army. It improved upon its predecessor, the Light Tank Mk VIC, by introducing the extra firepower of a 2-pounder gun. The War Office ordered 70 tanks, an order that eventually increased to 220. Production was delayed by several factors and only 100 to 177 of the tanks were produced. (Note: Tucker states that 177 of the Mk VIIs were built during the war, but Flint states that whilst this figure is given in most published sources, surviving War Office documentation gives a lower figure of 100)

The design flaws of the tank, combined with the decision by the War Office not to use light tanks in British armoured divisions, ruled out the use of Tetrarchs in the North African Campaign. The majority of the tanks remained in Britain, although twenty were sent to the USSR as part of Lend-Lease. In early 1941, the Royal Armoured Corps formed three squadrons for use in overseas amphibious operations, one of which was equipped with Tetrarchs. In May 1942, a small number of Tetrarchs formed part of the British force which participated in Operation Ironclad, the invasion of Madagascar. In June 1942, Tetrarchs were attached to the 1st Airborne Division after it was decided that the design allowed its use as an air-portable light tank to support British airborne forces. The Tetrarchs were transported and landed in specially designed General Aircraft Hamilcar gliders. A lack of gliders prevented their participation in the Allied invasion of Sicily in 1943; instead they were attached to the new 6th Airborne Division and became part of the 6th Airborne Armoured Reconnaissance Regiment.

The division used approximately twenty Tetrarchs during Operation Tonga, the British airborne landings in Normandy in June 1944. The tanks were landed by glider, where their appearance caused the Germans to cancel a counter-attack at a key moment in the battle but individually, they did not perform well. Several were lost in accidents and those that did see action proved to be inferior in firepower and armour to the armoured vehicles of the German forces. A few days after the beginning of the operation, the tanks were removed from direct engagement with German armour and used only to provide fire support. By August 1944, most of the Tetrarchs in action were replaced with Cromwell tanks and the remainder were replaced by the M22 Locust in December 1944.

Tetrarchs did not see any further combat and were deemed obsolete by 1946; the last was retired in 1950. There were several variations on the Tetrarch design, including the Alecto self-propelled gun and the Light Tank Mk VIII but none of these were used operationally by the British Army.

== Development history ==
=== Initial development ===
The prototype of the Light Tank Mk VII (A17), nicknamed 'Purdah', was first developed in 1937 by Vickers-Armstrongs as a private venture, and was intended to be sold either to the British Army or to foreign militaries. It was to be the latest in a series of light tanks produced by the company. The tank was designed to overcome the shortcomings of insufficient armament in earlier light tanks that were fitted only with machine guns. Vickers-Armstrong installed on the Mk VIIs a 40 mm (1.6 in) QF 2-pounder main gun paired with a 7.92 mm (0.312 in) Besa machine gun, and mounted the two guns in a two-man turret. The tank had a maximum of 14 millimetres (0.55 in) of armour. The prototype weighed approximately 16,800 lb (7,600 kg) and was powered by a 165-horsepower (123 kW) Meadows engine. Suspension was on eight road wheels, four per side, with no separate driver or idler wheels and it was capable of a 40 miles per hour (64 km/h) top speed. The Mk VII design relied on an unusual steering method and a mechanical system incorporated into earlier Vickers models. The front wheels could be steered to allow for gentle turns by bending the tracks. For sharper turns, the system returned to the conventional method of braking one track to turn the tank; the dual system of turning was designed to lessen mechanical strain on the Mk VII and reduce its power wastage. The suspension system was also a new design that relied on struts with pockets of air for springing and cushions of oil for damping, and each of the wheels was independently sprung.

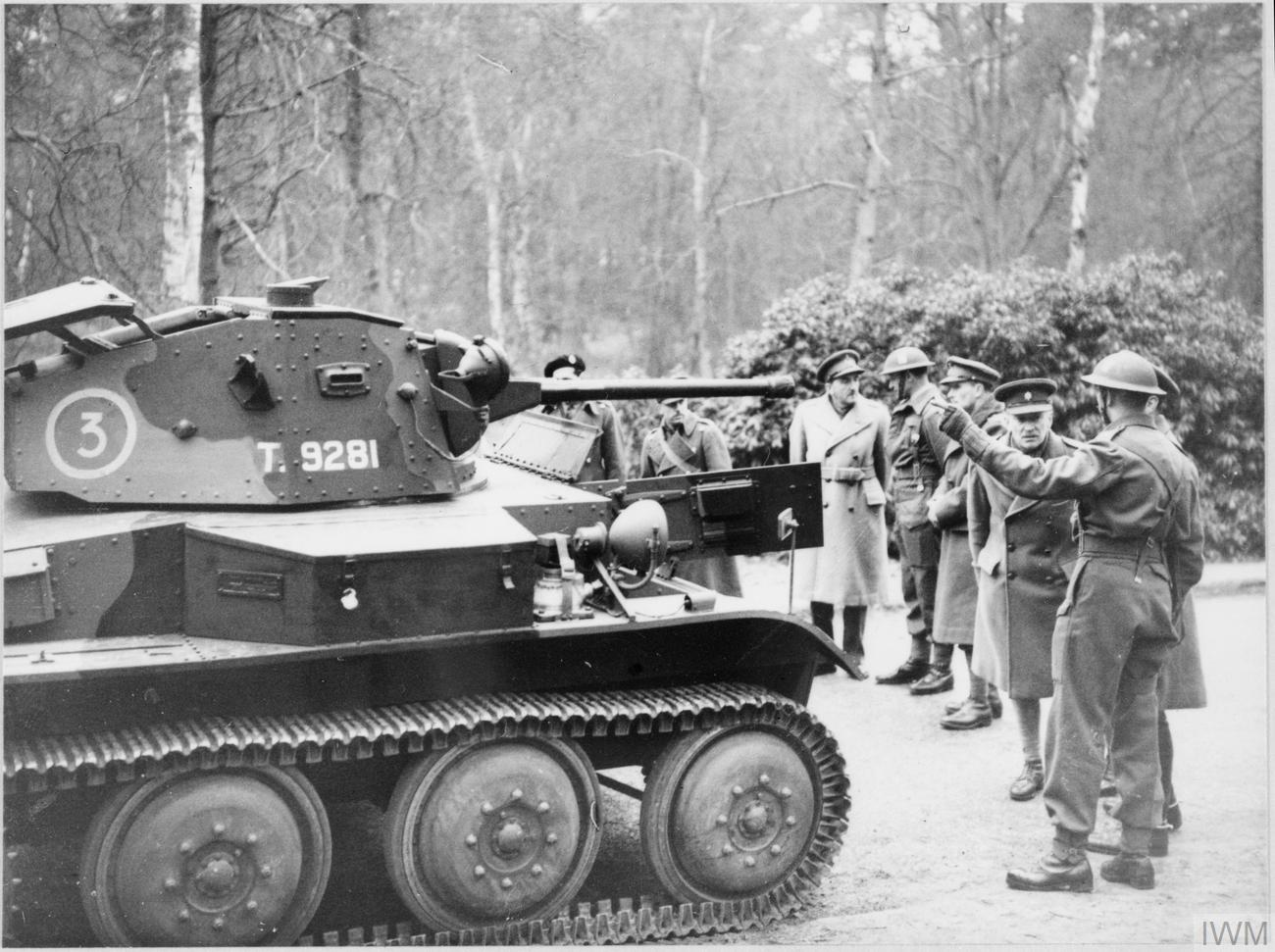
General Sir Alan Brooke, Commander-in-Chief Home Forces, inspecting a Light Tank Mk VII (Tetrarch) at the Army Staff College, 1941

The War Office examined the design and put the prototype through a series of trials during May and June 1938; the model was tested as a possible "light cruiser" since War Office light tank needs were already met by its predecessor, the Mark VI. The War Office then took the view that the tank was not acceptable as a light cruiser because the Nuffield A13 design offered better speed and obstacle crossing performance. Despite this, it was decided that it was essential for some Tetrarchs to be produced, and it was suggested that they be brought in at the end of the light tank program. Accordingly, the War Office gave the Tetrarch the official General Staff specification number A17, and, in November 1938, accepted it for limited production after requesting a few minor changes which included the fitting of an external fuel tank to increase the tank's range.

=== Production ===
The number to be produced was subject to fluctuation as the War Office vacillated in their demand; in July 1938, it requested that 70 of the tanks be produced, then increased the request to 120 after a three-day conference in November. Production was to begin in July 1940, but meanwhile the War Office temporarily returned to its original order of 70 before increasing the number to 100. The number further increased to 220 after Metropolitan Cammell Carriage & Wagon, a company part owned by Vickers-Armstrong that would be producing the tanks, indicated it had already ordered armour plating for that many tanks.

Production of the tank was delayed by a number of factors. The War Office put their order on hold in a post-Battle of France decision to focus military production on infantry and cruiser tanks, due to the poor performance of British light tanks during that battle. Due to the shortage of more suitable tanks, light tanks that were not designed for use against German armour, were nevertheless deployed against them; the resulting high casualties led the War Office to re-evaluate the suitability of the light tank design. The pre-war role of the light tank, that of reconnaissance, meanwhile had been found to be better suited to scout cars that used smaller crews and had better road abilities. Further delays were caused by the bombing raids of the Luftwaffe during May 1941 against the factories where the tanks were assembled.

The cumulative effect of these delays resulted in the production of only a small number of Mk VIIs; estimates place the final total produced to be between 100 and 177. The name 'Tetrarch' was given to the Mk VII, on 22 September 1941, on the orders of the War Office. The last of the tanks were built in the first quarter of 1942 and delivered at the end of the year.

=== Transfer to airborne role ===
The War Office and the Army were concluding, at this point, that light tanks were a liability and too vulnerable for use in further combat, and the Tetrarch was considered to be obsolete. This decision may have marked the end for the Tetrarch in active service; several of the tanks destined to be deployed to the Eighth Army in the Middle East for the North African Campaign were left in Britain when their cooling systems were determined to be unable to cope with the intense North African heat.

The demise of Tetrarch was prevented by a decision made by the War Office in mid-1941, as it was considering the equipment to be used by Britain's fledgling airborne forces, formed in June 1940 under the orders of the Prime Minister, Winston Churchill. When selecting the equipment for the airborne forces, officials at the War Office concluded that gliders would be an integral component; gliders would transport troops and heavy equipment, which, by 1941, was to include artillery and some form of tank. Plans to transport a tank went through a number of revisions, but, by May 1941, the feasibility of a 5.5 metric tons (5.4 long tons) tank to be carried for 350 miles (560 km) in a glider was accepted, although the aircraft would have to be specifically designed for the task. In a conference held on 16 January 1941, it was decided that the General Aircraft Hamilcar, currently under development, would be used to transport a single Tetrarch tank or two Universal Carriers. The Tetrarch was chosen because it was an obsolete design, and was therefore available to be used by the airborne forces.

Beginning in January 1944, training exercises were conducted carrying the Tetrarchs and their crews inside Hamilcar gliders. These exercises were successful; during the training by 'C' Squadron of the Glider Pilot Regiment, which specialised in flying the Hamilcars, over 2,800 lifts were made with an average of 50 lifts per crew. Only three incidents resulted in fatalities or injuries, with seven pilots killed during the training. When the Tetrarch was re-designated as an airborne tank, several changes were made to its design. A number of tanks had their 2-pounder guns replaced with a 76.2-millimetre (3.00 in) infantry support howitzer; these tanks were then designated as Tetrarch 1 CS (Close Support). Additionally, Littlejohn adaptors were added to those Tetrarchs which still possessed their 2-pounders to increase their muzzle velocity and armour penetration.

The Tetrarch experienced several setbacks throughout its development and deployment with the Army and airborne forces. One of the major problems was the limited number of these tanks that existed after production ended in 1942, which particularly affected the airborne forces. The transport of 20 of the tanks to the USSR under the Lend-Lease Act depleted the number available for use by airborne forces, as did the loss of several more during Operation Ironclad, the invasion of Madagascar. A Royal Armoured Corps report issued in December 1942 stated that approximately 50 Tetrarchs were available for use. In a memorandum, dated January 1943, by Major General George F. Hopkinson, commander of the 1st Airborne Division, Hopkinson complained that he had been informed that 70 of the tanks were available, whereas only 50 actually remained, with no reserves to replace those lost in combat. This lack of sufficient replacement reserves, combined with a War Office report that some 287 airborne tanks would be required for the 1st Airborne Division and an unnamed airborne division to be formed in India, led to the Tetrarch's eventual replacement by the US M22 Locust.

== Performance ==
A number of design faults of the Tetrarch were revealed through its operational use. Its size limited the possible crew to three, a driver in the hull and a gunner and commander in the turret, resulting in too few crew members to operate the Tetrarch effectively. The gunner or commander, in addition to his own duties, had to act as loader for the 2-pounder, which caused delays in combat. A report on the tank written in January 1941 stated that as the commander had to both fight and control the tank, controlling a troop of Tetrarchs during combat would be almost impossible.

Problems were also found with the Littlejohn adaptor fitted to the 2-pounder to increase its range and penetration power; after they had been fitted the adapters could not be removed, and could only fire specially designed armour-piercing rounds, which took time to manufacture.

The War Office also considered the Tetrarch's cooling system faulty, making the tank unsuitable for service in hotter climates, such as the Middle East and North Africa.

== Operational history ==
=== Lend-lease ===
The first Tetrarchs were delivered to the Army in November 1940, and were initially deployed with the 1st Armoured Division (which was being refitted after losing the majority of its previous tanks during the Battle of France) and the newly formed 6th Armoured Division. However, the faults discovered with the Tetrarch cooling system precluded them from being integrated into units that were sent to the Middle East to participate in the North African Campaign. Shortly after, all light tanks were discarded from the establishments of British armoured divisions as not suitable for further service.

The Tetrarchs remained in Britain, and would probably have been used as training vehicles before being retired from service, but on 22 June 1941 the German invasion of the USSR, Operation Barbarossa began, and the USSR became an ally of Britain. The Lend-Lease program, begun in March 1941 by the United States of America to supply defensive materials to Britain and China, was therefore extended to the USSR. As part of the program, the British government began supplying war materials to the USSR, which in early 1942, included a shipment of 20 Tetrarchs, as well as a number of Valentine and Matilda Mk I Infantry tanks. The Soviet military utilised a greater number of light tanks than the British, and so could use the Tetrarchs. When the tanks arrived in the USSR, however, it was apparent that the design problems with the cooling system were also present in cold conditions; additionally, the cold weather had a deleterious effect on the tank's suspension and tracks. Additional testing of the Tetrarchs was conducted by the Soviet military and the design was admired for its controllability, manoeuvrability, and speed, as well its ability to run on low-quality fuel, unlike contemporary Soviet designs. The thinness of the Tetrarch's armour was found to be a problem and one which could not be solved, as the weight of extra armour plating caused an unacceptable reduction in the tank's speed. Despite these drawbacks in the Tetrarch's design, Soviet authorities believed it to be comparable to the T-70 light tank in use at the time, and decided that it was suitable to be used in combat. A number of Tetrarchs were sent to Tank Training Schools which were subsequently sent into battle, and in September 1943 two were assigned to the 132nd Separated Tank Battalion, which was attached to the 5th Guards Tank Brigade; both tanks were destroyed in combat, one on 30 September and the other on 2 October, the latter a casualty of artillery fire. Several were also used for propaganda purposes, appearing in photographs of Soviet troops who were fighting in the Caucasus region.

=== Operation Ironclad ===
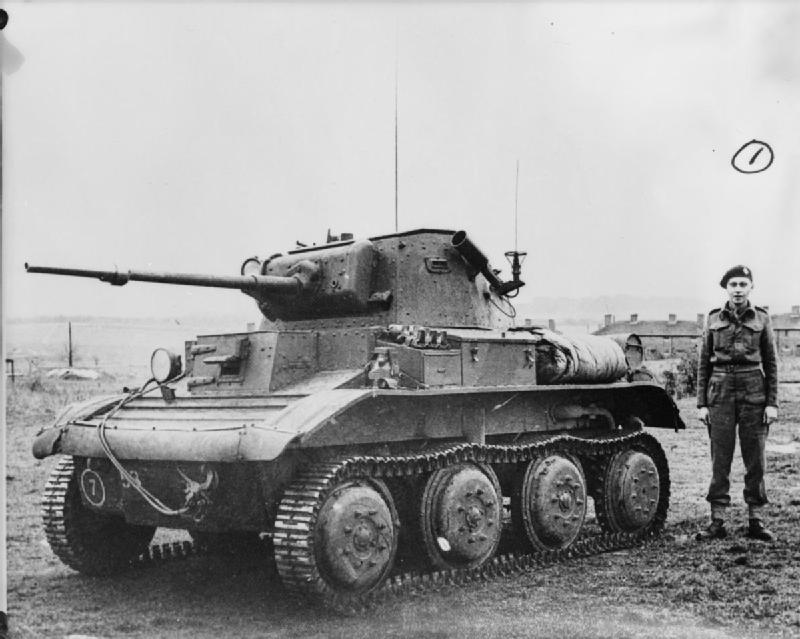
Tetrarch with Littlejohn (or Janeček) adaptor

In mid-1941, the Royal Armoured Corps in Britain created three tank squadrons for special overseas operations, known as 'A', 'B' and 'C' Special Service Squadrons. Both 'A' and 'B' Squadrons were equipped with Valentine Infantry tanks and Mark VIc light tanks, but 'C' Squadron was equipped with twelve Tetrarchs transferred from the 2nd Armoured Brigade, 1st Armoured Division. On 31 July 1941, 'C' Squadron was officially activated and immediately received orders to prepare for overseas service alongside 'A' and 'B' Squadrons in an unspecified tropical climate. All three squadrons were transported to Inverary in Scotland for intensive training that focused on embarkation and disembarkation from ships and landing craft to prepare them for action in potential amphibious operations. In early September, elements of 'C' Squadron, including six Tetrarchs, formed part of a force which sailed for Freetown in West Africa; during this period of the war there were fears that the Spanish government might enter the conflict on the side of Germany, and the force was readied to capture a number of Spanish islands off the coast of Africa if this occurred. Spain remained neutral, so the units were redeployed.

The next assignment, Operation Ironclad, was the May 1942 invasion of Madagascar, the third largest island in the world and then under Vichy French control. The Prime Minister and the Combined Chiefs of Staff decided that Madagascar should be occupied as rapidly as possible to deny the port of Antsirane to Japanese naval forces, which had recently advanced into the Indian Ocean. Operation Ironclad was under the command of Major General Robert G. Sturges and consisted of No. 5 Commando, 29th Independent Brigade Group, and the 17th and 13th brigade groups from 5th Infantry Division. The 29th Brigade formed the core of the invasion force due to its training in amphibious operations, and under its command was 'B' Special Service Squadron, created by amalgamating six Valentines from 'B' Squadron and six Tetrarchs from 'C' Squadron into a single unit. The squadron was formed into four troops, one Headquarters troop of three Valentines and one Tetrarch, one of four Valentines, and two formed from the remaining five Tetrarchs. The invasion force assembled off the west coast of the northern tip of Madagascar on 4 May, near Antsirane and the bay of Diego Suarez. The invasion plan called for an amphibious assault landing on four beaches on the west side of the tip, which would allow the British forces to advance approximately 20 miles (32 km) and approach Antsirane from the rear. Information about the landing beaches, the defences possessed by the port, and the Vichy French defending forces was limited and vague, although it was believed that the defenders had no weapons capable of penetrating the armour of a Valentine tank.

The landings began at 04:30 on 5 May, with 5 Commando landing at Courrier Bay and the three infantry brigades and 'B' Squadron landing at Ambararata Bay. The objective of the infantry brigades and their armoured support was to take control of Antsirane and a nearby town, but although the infantry landed successfully, 'B' Squadron had more trouble; the area of beach designated for its landing craft was blocked for several hours after a Tetrarch came loose from a landing craft and became stuck in the sand. The infantry brigades advanced toward Antsirane without the squadron, but eventually two Valentines and a single Tetrarch were dispatched in support, catching up with the lead elements of the infantry near the town of Anamakia. Here the invasion force encountered the first French defences, consisting of camouflaged trenches and pillboxes dug in along a ridge. The tanks attempted to breach them, but the rocky ground made manoeuvring difficult and they could not close with the pillboxes and trenches; they engaged a number of targets with 2-pounder and machine-gun fire, but the line had to be cleared by an infantry assault later in the day. The tanks were ordered to outflank the defences and advance further into the island, and they were soon joined by two other Tetrarchs dispatched from the beaches; the small force continued to advance until it encountered the Vichy French main line of defence. This had been built prior to the First World War and included camouflaged pillboxes, machine-gun nests and dug-in 75 mm artillery pieces; the latter, although not specifically designed for an anti-tank role, could penetrate the armour of both the Tetrarchs and the Valentines. The two Valentines advanced first but were knocked out by artillery fire, and two Tetrarchs that were moving behind them suffered the same fate; the third Tetrarch retreated in order to report on the French resistance, machine gunning a motorcycle combination and a truck it encountered on the way back.

The commander of the Tetrarch made his report, and was then ordered to take command of four Valentines and two Tetrarchs which had recently arrived and once again attempt to breach the French defences. The tanks followed the road leading to the defensive line and then attempted to out-flank the line by advancing from the right-hand side, using several hills as cover; the artillery pieces were able to turn and face the assault, however, and one Valentine and one Tetrarch were hit and destroyed. The remaining tanks exchanged several volleys of fire with the artillery pieces before retreating back to their original positions. The French line was eventually broken by 29th Brigade, aided by an amphibious assault by Royal Marines; the remaining tanks of 'B' Squadron, two Valentines and three Tetrarchs, remained in defensive positions until the afternoon of 6 May, coming under sporadic artillery fire which disabled another Valentine. The squadron played no further part in the battle, as the Vichy French authorities negotiated a formal surrender the following day, although French troops would continue to engage the British occupying force in guerrilla warfare until late November. 'B' and 'C' Squadrons were embarked onto SS Ocean Viking for use during these operations, but in the event they were not used. 'C' Squadron suffered heavy casualties during the invasion; only one Valentine and three Tetrarchs out of twelve tanks were functional by 7 May, and the squadron had suffered seven killed and six wounded. It remained in Madagascar until early 1943, when it was shipped to India and took part in the Burma Campaign as part of 29th Brigade.

=== Operation Tonga ===
Because of a lack of equipment training facilities in mid-1940, when the British airborne establishment was formed, the War Office was able to accept only 500 volunteers for training as airborne troops. Progress in setting up proper training facilities and acquiring suitable transport aircraft was so slow that the first British airborne operation, Operation Colossus, was conducted by a retrained Commando unit. By 1942, there existed specifically trained airborne units, including the 1st Airborne Division, and on 19 January 1942 the War Office decided that a light tank unit would be one of the support units attached to the division. This unit, designated the Light Tank Squadron, was to be formed of nineteen light tanks and would operate to the fore of the division, using their tanks' speed to capture objectives and then holding them until relieved by other units. The obvious unit for conversion was 'C' Special Services Squadron, as it was trained to act as an independent tank unit and, more importantly, was the only unit that was still using Tetrarchs; it had been re-designated as an airborne tank by the War Office. 'C' Squadron was officially transferred to the 1st Airborne Division on 24 June 1942, bringing with it seven Tetrarchs among its other vehicles. The unit immediately began training, but was not attached to the 1st Airborne Division for long; during mid-1943, the division was transported to the Middle East so it could participate in the Allied invasion of Sicily. 'C' Squadron remained in Britain, as not enough Hamilcar gliders had been built by the time the division departed to transport its Tetrarchs; the squadron was transferred to the 6th Airborne Division, which had been raised in April 1943, and 'C' Squadron remained with it for the rest of the conflict. The squadron continued to train as an air-portable unit, and participated in a number of exercises to prepare for its new duties, including reconnaissance of enemy positions and counter-attacking enemy infantry and armour.

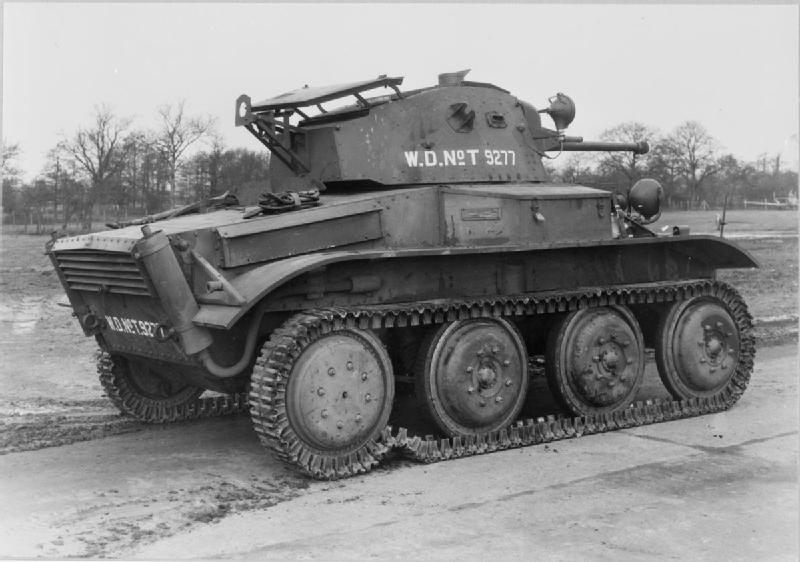
Side and rear view of a Tetrarch light tank

On 13 December 1943, the War Office decided to expand the squadron into a regiment equipped with a combination of light tanks and conventional reconnaissance vehicles such as scout cars, and on 1 April 1944, it was re-designated as the 6th Airborne Armoured Reconnaissance Regiment. The regiment consisted of a Headquarters Squadron, a Light Tank Squadron and a Reconnaissance Squadron; two Tetrarchs, the Mark 1 CS variation, were attached to the Headquarters Squadron, but the Light Tank Squadron, also known as 'A' Squadron, received the majority of the Tetrarchs. 'A' Squadron had approximately nineteen Tetrarchs split between six troops, two of which were of the CS variation and the rest were armed with 2-pounders fitted with Littlejohn adaptors. On 24 May 1944, after participating in a further series of exercises and manoeuvres, 'A' Squadron moved from their training area to a transit camp at Tarrant Rushton airfield, while the rest of the regiment moved to RAF Brize Norton airfield the next day; from these two airfields, the regiment would be transported from to participate in the British airborne landings in Normandy. The operation began on the night of 5 June, with the deployment of 6th Airborne Division to eastern Normandy. It was tasked with protecting the eastern flank of the Allied seaborne landings, securing strategically important areas east of Caen, capturing several important bridges over the Caen Canal and River Dives, and destroying a coastal artillery battery. Insufficient transport aircraft were available to land all three of the division's brigades simultaneously; one would have to be landed in a second lift later in the day. Major General Richard Gale had initially intended for the 6th Airlanding Brigade, to which the 6th Airborne Armoured Reconnaissance Regiment was attached, to be landed first; however, aerial photography revealed that anti-glider poles had been erected in the landing zone selected for the brigade. Therefore, Gale decided that the 3rd Parachute Brigade and 5th Parachute Brigade (which did not utilise gliders) should land in the first lift to clear the landing zones, allowing the 6th Airlanding Brigade to land in the second lift.

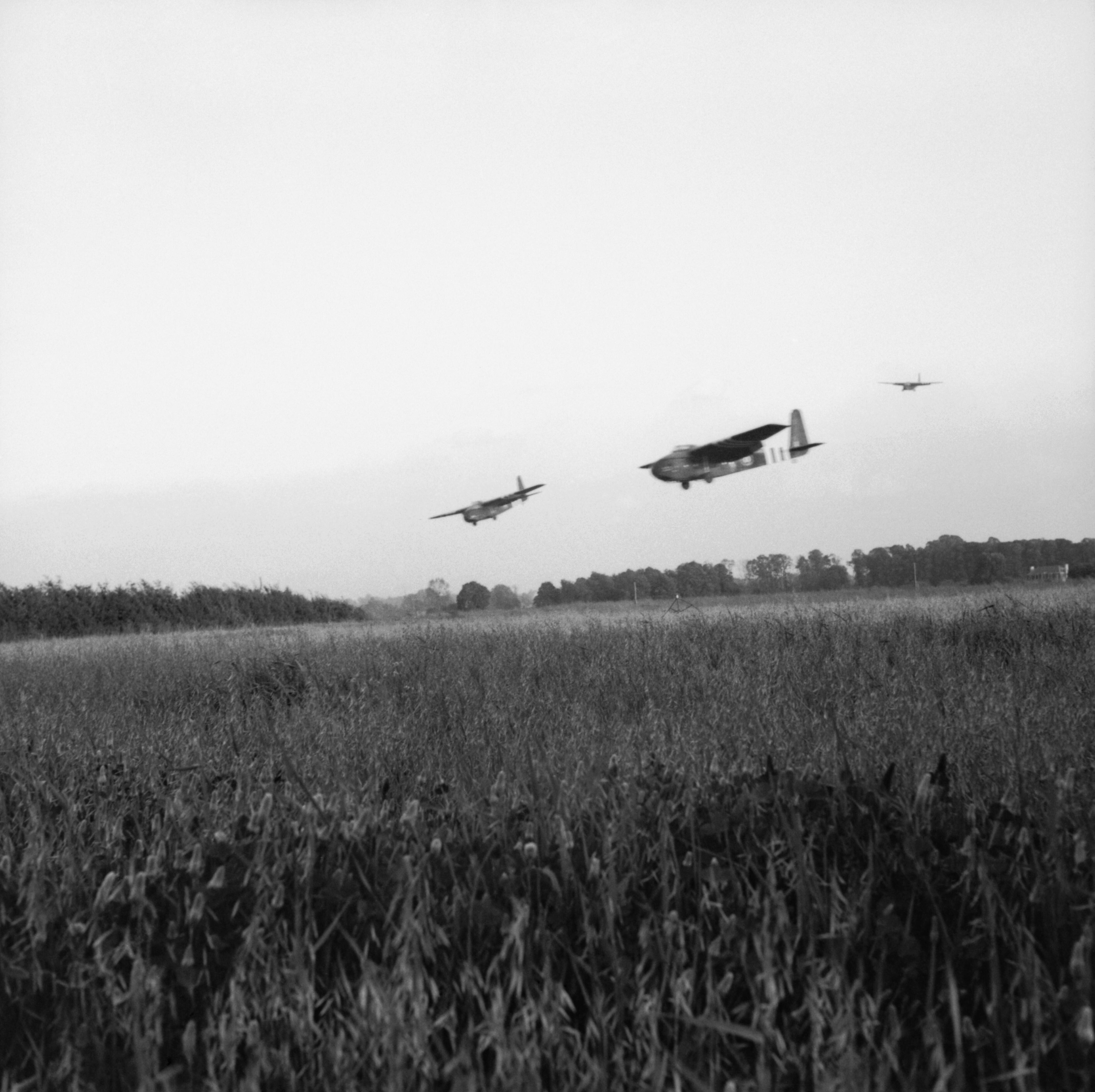
Hamilcar gliders of 6th Airlanding Brigade arrive on Drop Zone 'N' carrying Tetrarch tanks, 6 June 1944.

The Horsa and Hamilcar gliders of the brigade landed at 21:00 on 6 June in a landing zone cleared of obstructions by the 5th Parachute Brigade. The primary tasks of the brigade were to bring in reinforcements and supplies, and to aid the two parachute brigades in consolidating the area held by the division; the 6th Airborne Armoured Reconnaissance Squadron was to aid in the latter task, acting as a reconnaissance force to scout out German positions and impede the movement of German forces attempting to counter-attack. The Tetrarchs of 'A' Squadron were to play an integral part in this reconnaissance role due to their speed, but the squadron's strength of twenty tanks was severely depleted by the time it landed in Normandy. One tank was lost before the formation landed when the Tetrarch broke loose of its shackles and crashed through the nose of the glider carrying it, causing both to fall into the sea mid-flight. Two gliders collided with each other in the landing zone, destroying themselves and the Tetrarchs they carried. Another Hamilcar hit a Tetrarch that was being unloaded and flipped the tank upside down, rendering it unusable, although the crew escaped injury. The surviving tanks were then rendered temporarily immobile when parachute rigging lines became tangled in their suspensions, forcing their crews to cut the lines away with welding torches.

The squadron retrieved all of the remaining Tetrarchs and advanced to the south of the landing zone to link up with the rest of the regiment. There, they received orders to support the 8th Parachute Battalion in the Bois de Bavent area and conduct reconnaissance duties. After linking with the battalion, the squadron began reconnoitering, and engaged German infantry and armour they encountered. By the end of 7 June, two Tetrarchs had been lost to enemy action, one destroyed by a German self-propelled gun and the second by hitting a mine. The division was reinforced by British troops who were advancing from the invasion beaches and it began to push through Normandy, while the squadron continued its reconnaissance duties. At this time, Gale decided to avoid, when possible, engaging the Tetrarchs with German armour, as they proved to be completely outclassed by the German tanks and self-propelled guns, such as the Panzer IV and the Sturmgeschütz III. Instead, when the division required armoured support, it summoned it from armoured units outside the division, and the Tetrarchs were used to support infantry patrols and provide fire support. By August, in the division's preparation for the planned breakout from the Normandy bridgehead, the majority of Tetrarchs in 'A' Squadron were replaced with Cromwell fast cruiser tanks; only three Tetrarchs remained, assigned to the Headquarters troop of 'A' Squadron.

=== Post-war ===
Operation Tonga was the last that Tetrarchs saw of active combat. During the first week of October 1944, the 6th Airborne Armoured Reconnaissance Regiment underwent an extensive reorganization, in which it was completely restructured, and all the remaining Tetrarchs were retired. They were replaced with the M22 Locust, a purpose-built airborne light tank of American design; eight Locusts were used by the regiment in March 1945 during Operation Varsity, the airborne operation to cross the river Rhine. A report issued by the Director (Air) of the War Office in January 1946 confirmed that the Tetrarch design was considered obsolete, and any light tanks used in post-war airborne formations would be entirely new in design. A small number of Tetrarchs remained in service with the 3rd Hussars until 1949; a Hamilcar glider flight was stationed at RAF Fairford, and a troop of Tetrarchs was kept by the regiment for training exercises with the gliders. However, glider training by the regiment was stopped in 1950 and the Tetrarchs withdrawn from service.

== Variants ==
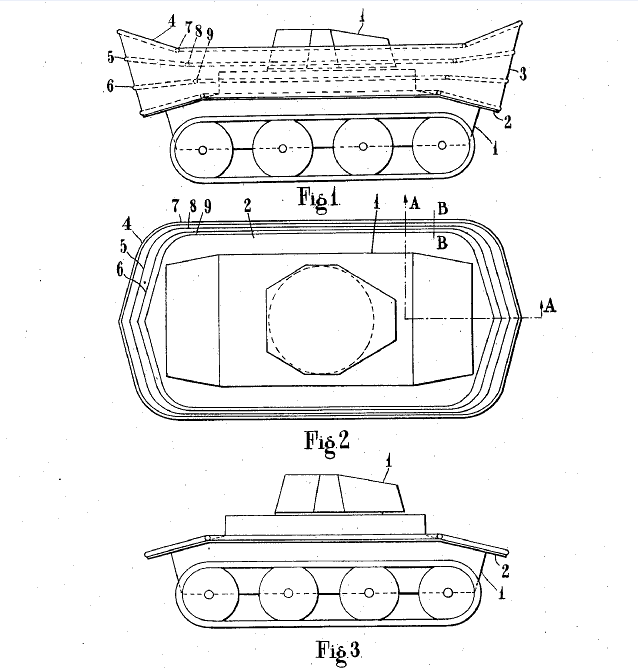
Diagram of a floatation screen fitted to a Tetrarch tank, taken from Straussler's patent, U.S. patent 2,390,747, issued 1945

There were several variants of the Tetrarch design. The first was the Light Tank Mk VIII, Vickers-Armstrong's proposed successor to the Tetrarch. The Mark VIII was also known as the Harry Hopkins, named after President Roosevelt's chief diplomatic advisor, and was given the General Staff design number A25 by the War Office. The Mark VIII was intended to improve upon the design of the Tetrarch in a number of areas. It had thicker armour than the Tetrarch, with the front hull and turret armour increased to a thickness of 38 millimetres (1.5 in) and the side armour to 17 millimetres (0.67 in), and the turret and hull given more sloped surfaces to help deflect shells fired at the tank. The dimensions of the Tetrarch were also changed; the Mark VIII was longer by 6 inches (0.15 m), wider by 1 foot 3 inches (0.38 m) and heavier. The new tank was no longer air-portable, as it was too heavy to be carried by a Hamilcar. The 12-cylinder engine of the Tetrarch was fitted to the Mark VIII, although the increased weight meant that its maximum speed decreased to 30 miles per hour (48 km/h); its armament also remained the same as that of the Tetrarch. The War Office authorised the construction of three prototype models in April 1941. The new design was considered a success, and the Tank Board of the War Office ordered 1,000 to be constructed in September. However, problems were encountered with further tests of the prototypes, and a report issued in December 1942 stated that production of the Mark VIII had been delayed due to developmental problems. These problems continued to persist into 1943, when the War Office decided against using the tank in active service; approximately 100 Mark VIIIs were produced by 1945, when production ended.

A second variant on the Tetrarch design was the Tetrarch Duplex Drive ("Tetrarch DD"). The Duplex Drive system was invented by Nicholas Straussler, and was designed to allow a tank to 'swim' through water and participate in amphibious operations. The system functioned by erecting a large waterproof canvas screen around the tank above its tracks, which was supported by thirty-six inflatable tubes and steel struts; this gave the tank sufficient buoyancy to float, and was then propelled along by a small propeller powered by the tank's engine. The screen could be collapsed by using a small explosive charge once the tank reached land. The system was fitted during June 1941, as the Tetrarch was the lightest light tank available at the time; the converted tank was successfully tested on a number of lakes and reservoirs, allowing the Duplex Drive system to be tested on heavier tanks, such as the Valentine. The system would be used during Operation Overlord, when M4 Sherman medium tanks would land on the invasion beaches.

== Survivors ==
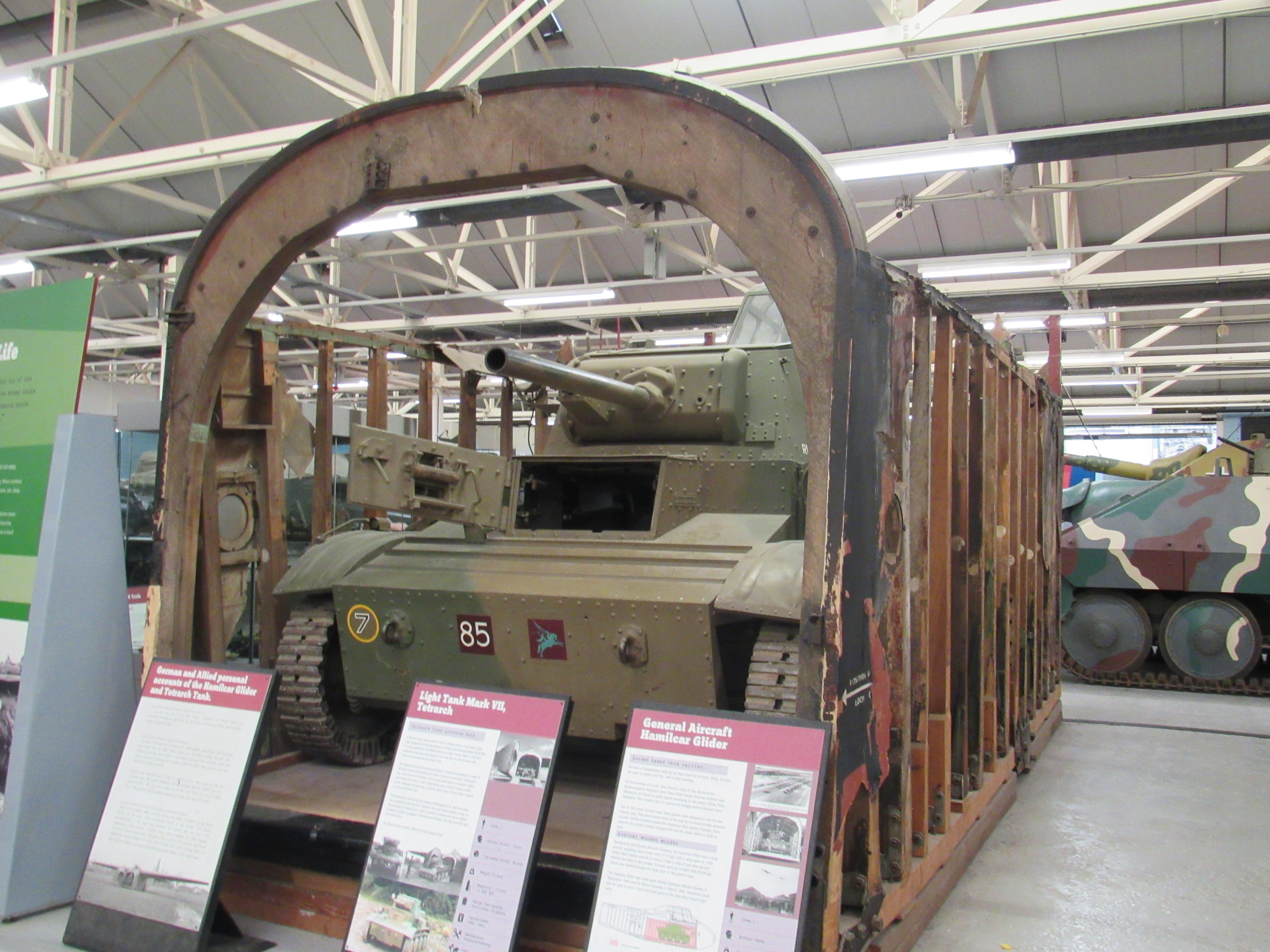
The Bovington Tetrarch, displayed within a fuselage section of a Hamilcar glider

A Tetrarch fitted with an Ordnance QF 3-inch howitzer is preserved at The Tank Museum in Bovington in England. A Tetrarch with an Ordnance QF 2-pounder is in the Kubinka Tank Museum in Russia.
