= Alecto (SPG) =

British self propelled gun from WWII

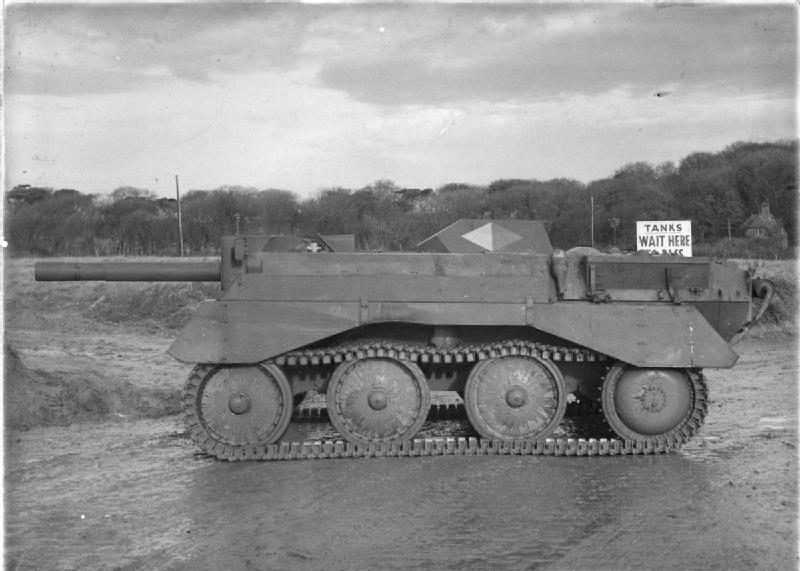
- Type: Self propelled gun
- Place of origin: United Kingdom

Production history
- Designer: Vickers
- Manufacturer: Vickers

Specifications
- Mass: 19,040 lb (8.64 t)
- Length: 14 ft (4.3 m)
- Width: 8 ft 10.5 in (2.705 m)
- Height: 6 ft 11 in (2.11 m)
- Crew: 3 or 4
- Armour: 6 - 38 mm
- Main armament: howitzer or AT gun
- Secondary armament: Vickers machine gun
- Engine: Henry Meadows HOP 12-cylinder petrol engine 162 hp (121 kW)
- Operational range: 125 mi (201 km)
- Maximum speed: 31.4 mph (50.5 km/h)

The Alecto, initially known as the Harry Hopkins Mk 1 CS, was a self propelled gun developed by the British during World War II.

== Development ==
In 1942 a project for a 3.75 inch (95 mm) howitzer was started. Two guns were made, and one of these was chosen for test mounting on a Light Tank Mk VIII "Harry Hopkins" chassis. Like the Harry Hopkins, the Alecto had skid steering, which operated by bowing the tracks through lateral movements of the central road wheels. The gun was mounted in an open-topped structure. The first trials were not started until late in 1944. The trials uncovered various problems but by the time these were solved the war in Europe was over. With little perceived potential for use in the war against Japan, the project was ended.

A small number of Alecto Is were completed, some served briefly with the British Army in Germany, arriving in the immediate post-war period and they equipped the heavy squadrons of at least the Kings Dragoon Guards operating in the Middle East just after the end of the war

== Variants ==
Mk I
3.75 inch (95 mm), 20 cal howitzer
Mk II
QF 6 pdr gun. Also known as "Alecto Recce"
Mk III
QF 25 pounder gun-howitzer. Prototype partially completed
Mk IV
QF 32-pounder, not built
Alecto Dozer
Some vehicles completed in 1945 with hydraulically operated bulldozer blades

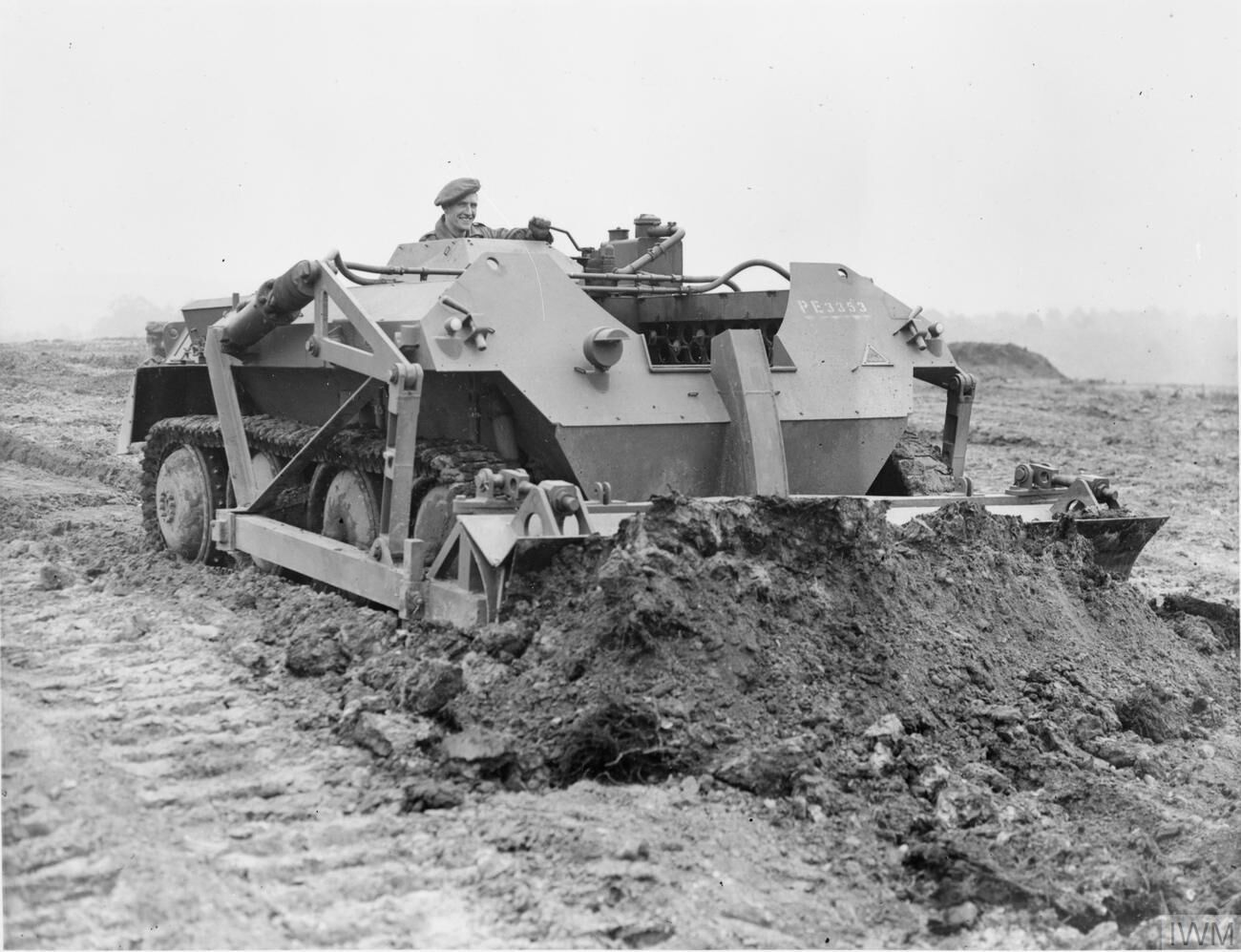
Alecto dozer.

== See also ==
- Light Tank Mk VII Tetrarch
- SP 17pdr, A30 (Avenger)
- SP 17pdr, Valentine (Archer)
