= Panzerabwehrkanone =

World War II German anti-tank cannons

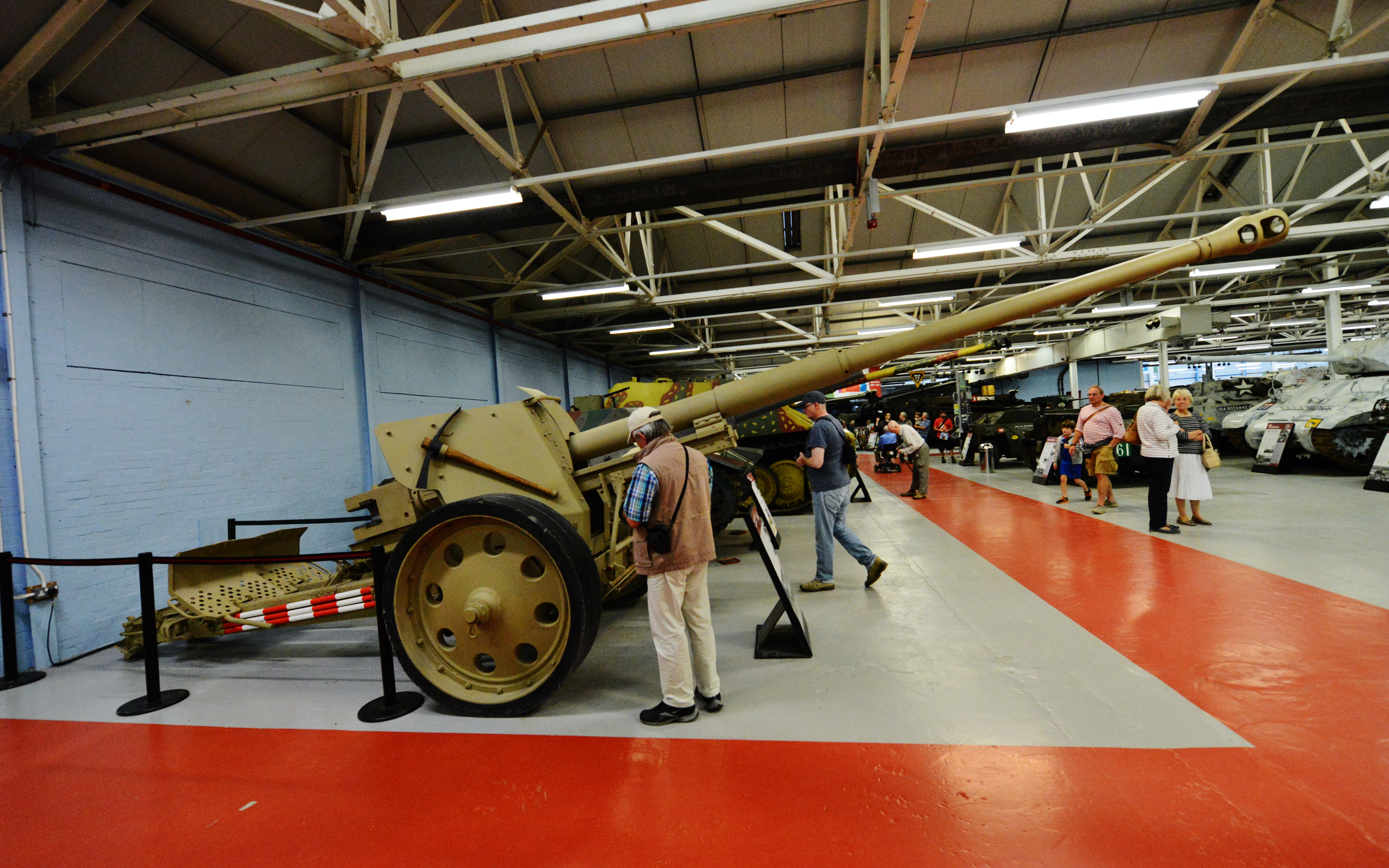
A Pak anti-tank gun at the Bovington Tank Museum

Panzerabwehrkanone (abbreviated as Pak), changed to Panzerjägerkanone in 1941, is the German term for anti-tank gun. In the English-speaking countries, however, Pak refers to the fifteen variants of Wehrmacht's anti-tank gun produced before or during World War II. Of these fifteen, PAW 600 and sPzB 41 do not bear the Pak designation in their names.

== Overview ==
A Pak's weight is within the range of 229 kg (505 lb) to 10,160 kg (22,400 lb). The smallest caliber was 28 mm (1.1 in) and the largest was 128 mm (5.0 in).

Over the six-year course of World War II the armor of the tanks steadily improved, so the size of the projectile had to increase. A larger projectile required a heavier weapon. All of these guns were meant to be towed. The earlier ones were light enough to be moved by hand over short distances, into and out of their firing positions. Some variants were only used on self-propelled guns.

== Variants ==
Pak guns
Designation	Produced (year)	Mass	Additional notes
3.7 cm Pak 36	1928	327 kg (721 lb)	
4.7 cm Pak 181(f)	1937	1,070 kg (2,360 lb)	Captured French anti-tank gun (47mm SA mle 1937)
5 cm Pak 38	1937	1,000 kg (2,200 lb)	
4.7 cm Pak 38(t)	1939	590 kg (1,300 lb)	Exclusively mounted on a tank destroyer
2.8 cm sPzB 41	1941	229 kg (505 lb)	sPzB meaning schwere Panzerbüchse, literally "heavy anti-tank rifle"
4.2 cm Pak 41	1941	560 kg (1,230 lb)	lightweight squeeze bore gun for airborne units
7.5 cm Pak 97/38	1941	1,190 kg (2,620 lb)	French 75mm gun on the 5cm Pak 38 carriage
7.5 cm Pak 40	1942	1,425 kg (3,142 lb)	
7.5 cm Pak 41	1942	1,390 kg (3,060 lb)	squeeze bore
7.62 cm Pak 36(r)	1942	1,710 kg (3,770 lb)	Captured Soviet anti-tank gun, modified to suit the needs of the German Army
7.5 cm PaK 39	1943	1,235 kg (2,723 lb)	only used as armament of Jagdpanzer vehicles
7.5 cm Pak 42	1943	1,000 kg (2,200 lb)	Mounted on the Jagdpanzer IV and the Panther tank, although, on the latter, it is designated 7.5 cm KwK 42
8.8 cm Pak 43	1943	3,650 kg (8,050 lb)	
12.8 cm Pak 44	1944	10,160 kg (22,400 lb)	
8 cm PAW 600	1945	640 kg (1,410 lb)	High-pressure combustion chamber, delivered propellant gas to a light-weight barrel. PAW stands for Panzerabwehrwerfer, literally "anti-tank launcher."

== See also ==
- Pak 57, a Swiss anti-tank gun
- 8.8 cm Flak 36, colloquially known as "eighty-eight," it was the dreaded German tank killer of the World War II.
