= 4.2 cm Pak 41 =

WWII German light anti-tank gun

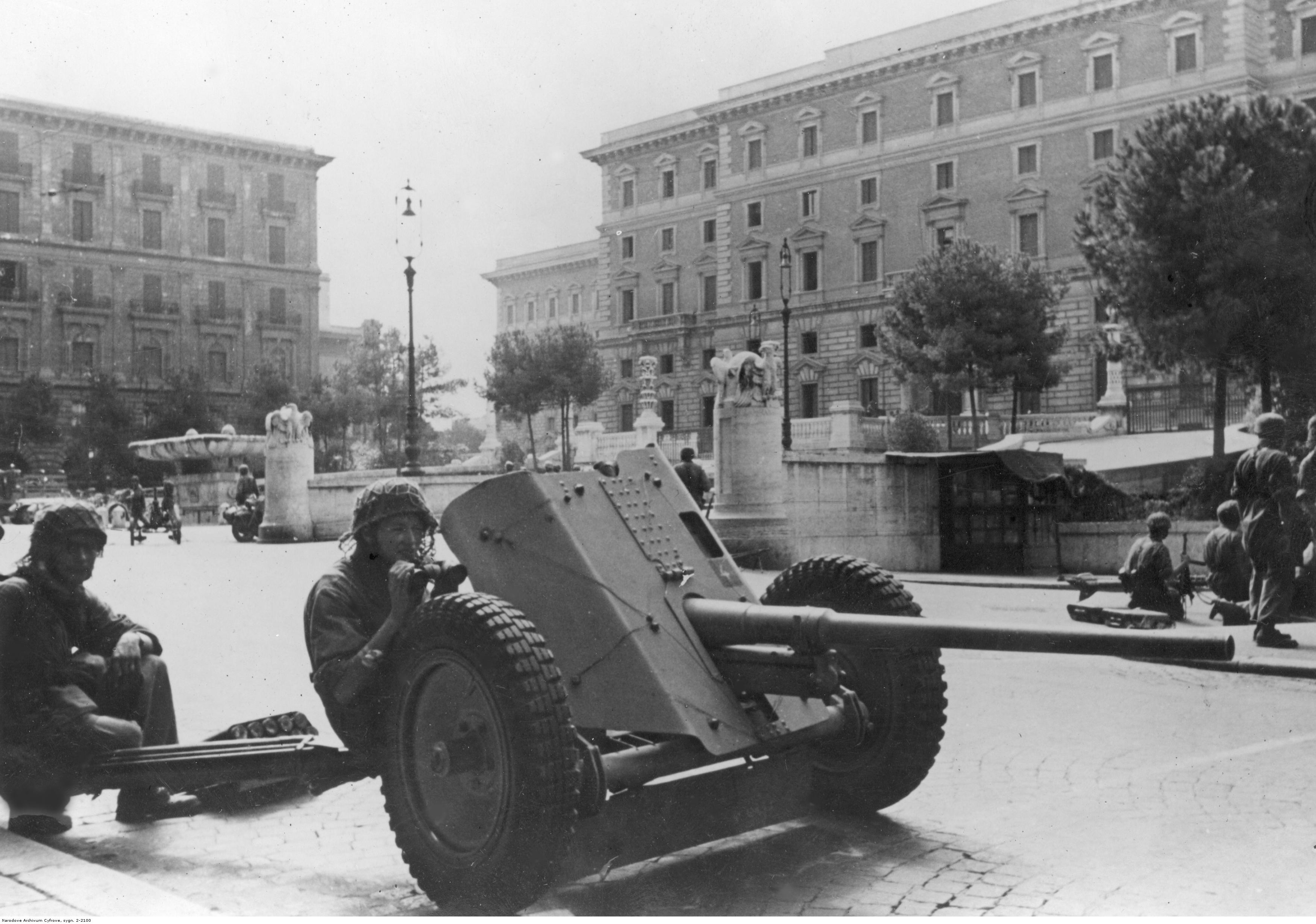
- A 4.2 cm Pak 41 light anti-tank gun in Italy, 1943.
- Type: Anti-tank gun
- Place of origin: Nazi Germany

Service history
- In service: 1942−1943
- Used by: Nazi Germany
- Wars: World War II

Production history
- Designer: Krupp
- Produced: 1941−1942
- No. built: 313

Specifications
- Mass: 642 kg (1,415 lb)
- Length: 2,350 mm (93 in)
- Barrel length: 2,114 mm (83.2 in)
- Shell: Armour-piercing, composite non-rigid (APCNR); High-explosive (HE)
- Shell weight: 1.52 kg (3.4 lb) (APCNR); 1.34 kg (3.0 lb) (HE)
- Caliber: 40.6 / 29.4 mm (1.60 / 1.16 in)
- Breech: Horizontal sliding-block
- Elevation: −8° to +25°
- Traverse: 60°
- Rate of fire: 10−12 rounds per minute
- Muzzle velocity: 1,265 m/s (4,150 ft/s)
- Maximum firing range: 1,000 m (3,300 ft)

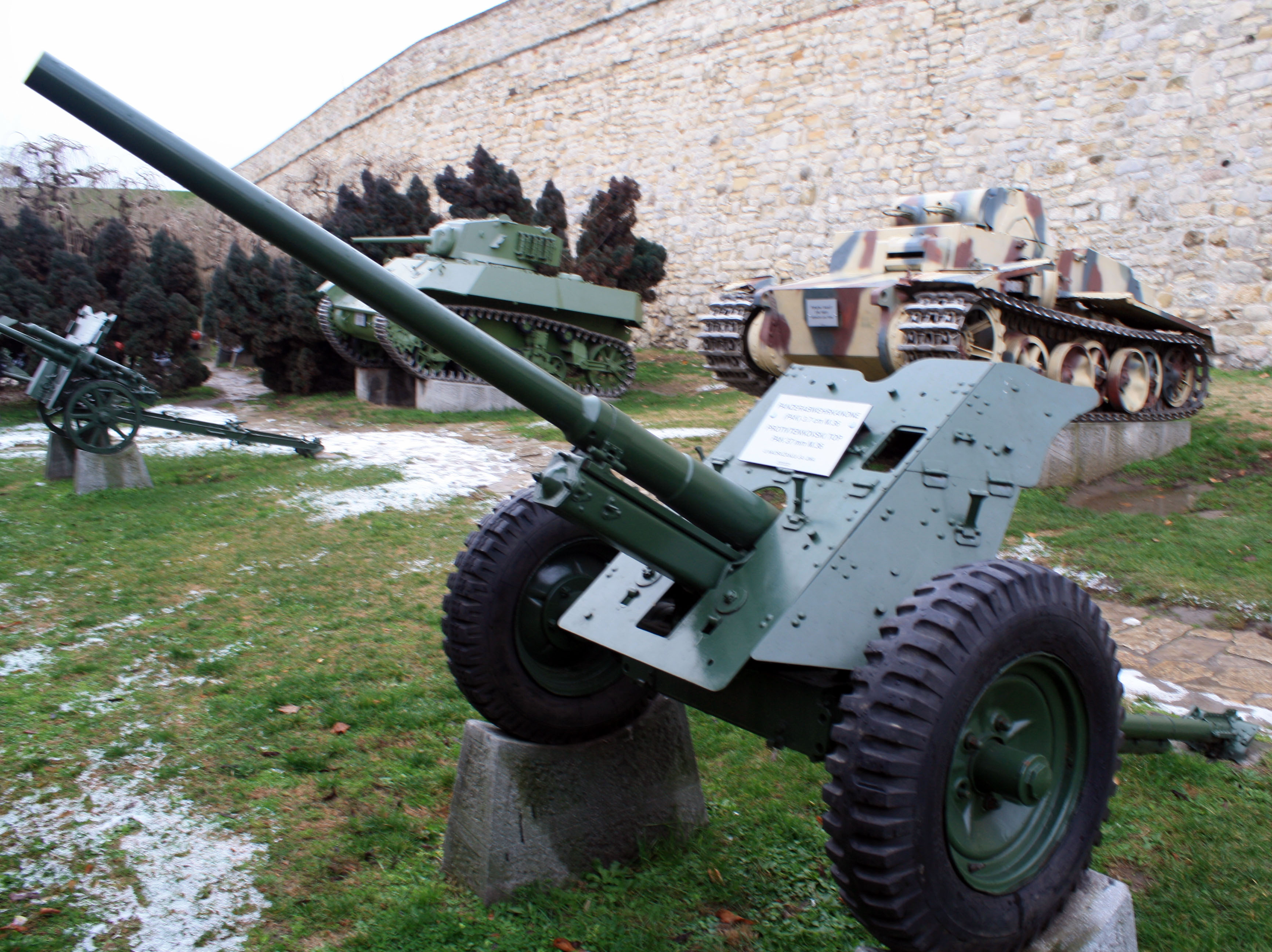
4.2 cm Pak 41 light anti-tank gun, part of Belgrade Military Museum outer exhibition at Kalemegdan fortress.

The 4.2 cm Pak 41 (Panzerjägerkanone —"anti-tank gun") was a light anti-tank gun issued to German airborne units in World War II. This gun was externally similar to the 3.7 cm Pak 36, using a modified version of the latter's carriage, but used the squeeze bore principle. While it was nominally a 4.2 cm (1.7 in) gun, the actual caliber was 4.06 cm (1.60 in) at the breech and tapering down to 2.94 cm (1.16 in) at the muzzle. It saw limited use in the Italian and Eastern campaigns before shortages of strategic metals prevented the production of new guns and ammunition.

== Background ==
The idea of tapering the barrel of a gun in order to increase muzzle velocity was worked on by several inventors before it was successfully applied by Hermann Gerlich, a German weapons designer, in the late 1920s. The German Army, using Gerlich's squeeze bore principle, managed to produce three different anti-tank guns based on it: the 2.8 cm schwere Panzerbuchse 41, the 4.2 cm Panzerjägerkanone 41, and the 7.5 cm Panzerabwehrkanone 41.

== Description ==
The 4.2 cm Pak 41 was mounted on the 3.7 cm Pak 36 carriage. Externally, the two guns are very similar to each other, with the only obvious difference being the length of the barrel, which was about 76 cm (30 in) longer. Other changes include a spaced gun shield which was fitted over the original shield, and replacing of the carriage coil springs with a laminated torsion bar.

Although nominally a 42 mm (1.7 in) caliber, the barrel actual caliber was 40.6 mm (1.60 in) at the breech end, tapering to 29.4 mm (1.16 in) at the muzzle, giving a muzzle velocity of 1,265 m/s (4,150 ft/s). The breech was manually operated only. The gun carriage was very similar to the Pak 36.

Armour-piercing (AP) shells for the 4.2 cm Pak 41 had a tungsten carbide core which was encased in a mild steel body which was formed into skirts of a larger caliber. When traveling through the barrel, these skirts were squeezed down increasing gas pressure around the base area of the projectile and subsequently boosting muzzle velocity. While the squeeze bore design successfully increased penetration, it also made designing high-explosive (HE) projectiles much more difficult, and these were rarely used. Other drawbacks was the need for tungsten, which had to be imported, and excessive barrel wear, reducing their service life and making the production of guns uneconomical.

== History ==
Produced in small numbers, it was used by some Fallschirmjäger divisions during 1942−1943, seeing limited use in the Italian front and a wider use in the Eastern front. Production was terminated in the summer 1942 due shortages of manganese (used in some of the carriage components) and tungsten.

== Specifications ==
The 4.2 cm Pak 41 fired AP and HE fixed rounds with a cartridge case length of 348 mm (13.7 in). The complete rounds weighted 1.52 kg (3.4 lb) for AP rounds and 1.34 kg (3.0 lb) for HE rounds.

=== 4.2 cm Pzgr Patr 41 ===
A 336 g (11.9 oz) tungsten carbide-cored AP round with a flanged body. Strongly resembling an upscaled 2.8 cm sPzB 41 round, it also used a magnesium alloy cap that produced a flash upon impact. The propelling charge was 435 g (15.3 oz) of Gudol RP.

Range	Penetration at 0 degrees from vertical	Penetration at 30 degrees from vertical
0 m	124 mm	95 mm
100 m	120 mm	90 mm
250 m	105 mm	83 mm
500 m	87 mm	72 mm
750 m	70 mm	62 mm
1000 m	60 mm	53 mm

=== 4.2 cm Sprgr Patr 41 ===
A 280 g (9.9 oz) HE round with a skirted body similar to the rounds used on the 2.8 cm sPzB 41. Nominally it used 310 g (11 oz) of Digl RP propellant, while in practice the propelling charge varied from batch to batch.

== See also ==
- 2.8 cm sPzB 41
- 7.5 cm Pak 41
- Littlejohn adaptor
