= Littlejohn adaptor =

Mechanical device

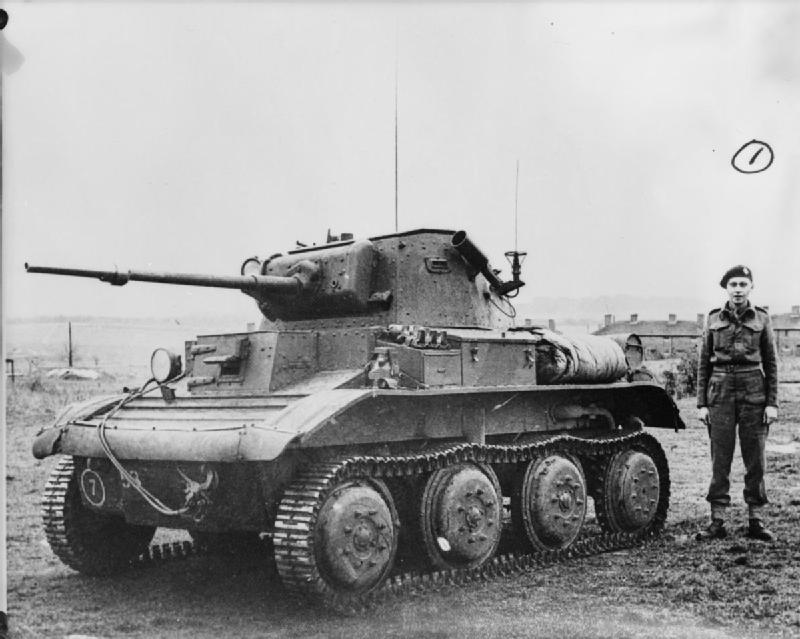
Light tank Mk VII Tetrarch Mk I with Littlejohn adaptor.

The Littlejohn adaptor was a device that could be added to the British QF 2 pounder (40 mm) anti-tank gun. It was used to extend the service life of the 2-pounder during the Second World War by converting it to squeeze bore operation, improving its ability to penetrate armor. "Littlejohn" came from the calque, i.e. literal anglicization, of the name of František Janeček, the Czech designer and factory owner who had been working on the squeeze-bore principle in the 1930s, and his son František Karel Janeček, who had brought his know-how to Britain after fleeing from German-occupied Czechoslovakia.

== Design ==
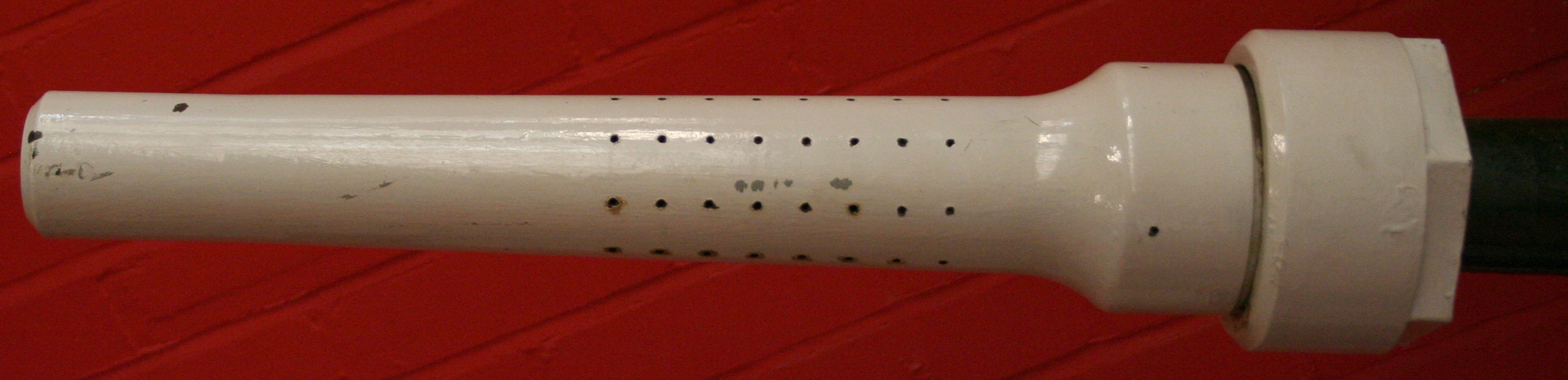
At Bovington Tank Museum

The adaptor took the form of a reducing bore that was screwed on to the end of the gun. This was coupled with a round formed from a hard core (tungsten) inside a softer metal casing - the armour-piercing, composite non-rigid (APCNR) design.

Upon firing, the round travelled the first part of the bore as normal, but on entering the tapering portion the softer and malleable metal of the outer shell of the round was compressed - from 40 mm to approximately 30 mm.

When the round emerged from the adaptor, it now had a smaller cross-section than before. Together with the higher driving pressure developed in a barrel of diminishing cross-section compared to a standard cylindrical bore, the APCNR round, called APSV (from armour-piercing super velocity), travelled faster, over a flatter trajectory. The Littlejohn adaptor/APCNR combination gave the 2 pounder a similar effect as the armour-piercing discarding sabot round used with the much larger and heavier QF 6 pounder gun.

The muzzle velocity of the APSV Mark II shell was 1,143 m/s compared with the 792 m/s of the normal 1.2 kg APCBC shell. The lighter Mark I APSV shell was capable of penetrating 88 mm of armour at 450 m at a 30-degree angle of impact.

In 1942, US Ordnance tested the Littlejohn adaptor in an attempt to develop a taper bore adaptor for the 37 mm Gun M3. The adaptor distorted after a few shots.

== Use ==
The adaptor was chiefly used on British armoured cars, e.g. the Daimler, which had been designed and built earlier in the war and could not be readily fitted with a larger gun. As an adaptor to the existing gun it could be removed so that normal rounds could be fired. This offered increased anti-armour effect but with obvious drawbacks in combat conditions. When crews discovered the special 'squeeze bore' ammunition was more effective than the standard 2-pounder anti-tank round even when not 'squeezed', the usual practice was to store the adaptors rather than have them fitted.

It was also experimentally fitted to the Vickers 40mm S Gun fitted to the Hawker Hurricane IID anti-armour variant, but the conclusion published in the official bulletin of the European Cartridge Research Association was:

Tests in the Far East showed a high level of accuracy, with an average of 25% of shots fired at tanks striking the target. Attacks with HE were twice as accurate as with AP, possibly because the ballistics were a closer match to the .303" Browning machine guns used for sighting... the gun/ammunition combination did not function with sufficient reliability...

— Anthony G. Williams, The Cartridge Researcher

== See also ==
- 2.8 cm sPzB 41 – German anti-tank gun working on the squeeze bore principle.
- 4.2 cm Pak 41 – Most comparable German anti-tank gun working on the squeeze bore principle.
- 7.5 cm PaK 41 – Another German anti-tank gun working on the squeeze bore principle.
