= Sub-caliber ammunition =

Type of firearm ammunition

Sub-caliber_ammunition

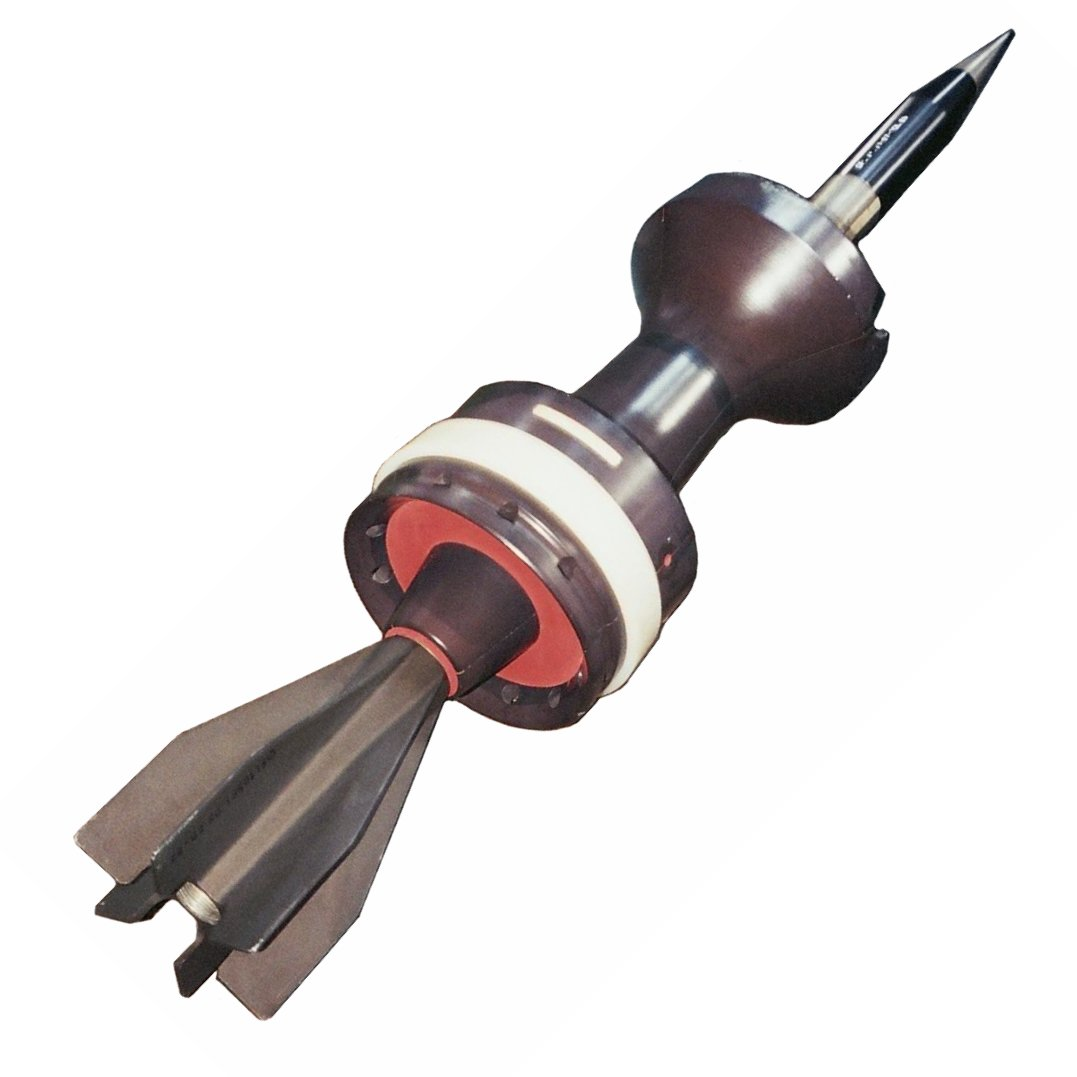
A sub-caliber armour-piercing fin-stabilized discarding sabot projectile in its sabot.

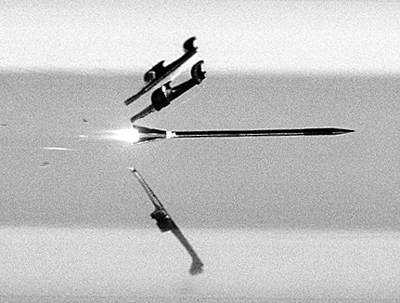
A sub-caliber armour-piercing fin-stabilized discarding sabot projectile separating from its sabot.

Sub-caliber ammunition (also spelled subcaliber) is firearm ammunition in which the diameter of the projectile is smaller than the bore of the gun barrel from which it is fired. Sub-caliber ammunition has several capabilities that full-caliber ammunition does not. For example, it can achieve a higher muzzle velocity than a full-caliber projectile from the same propellant charge, while costing less because of the smaller amount of material used.

Several methods exist for firing sub-caliber ammunition.

== Sabot method ==
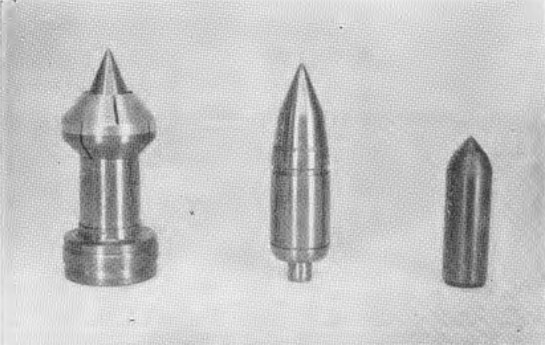
Sub-caliber armour-piercing discarding sabot projectile. Here seen with and without its sabot as well as its internal tungsten core.

The most traditional way to fire sub-caliber ammunition is to fit the projectile with an expendable sabot. The sabot is a device which fills out the missing caliber when the projectile is fired and then leaves the projectile once it has left the barrel.

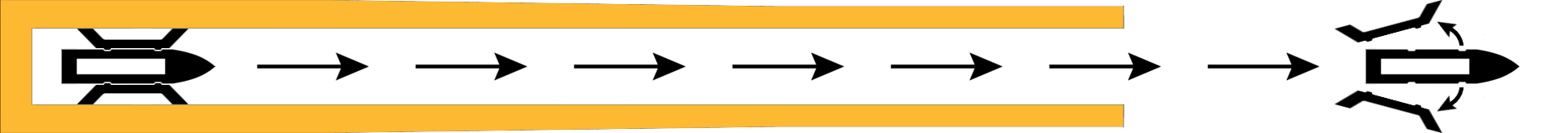
Diagram of the sabot method

=== Saboted sub-caliber ammunition types ===
- Armour-piercing discarding sabot (APDS)
- Armour-piercing fin-stabilized discarding sabot (APFSDS)
- Saboted light armor penetrator (SLAP)
- Flechette (not necessarily a sub-caliber projectile)
- Shotgun shell (the wad is considered a sabot in some countries)

== Flange method ==
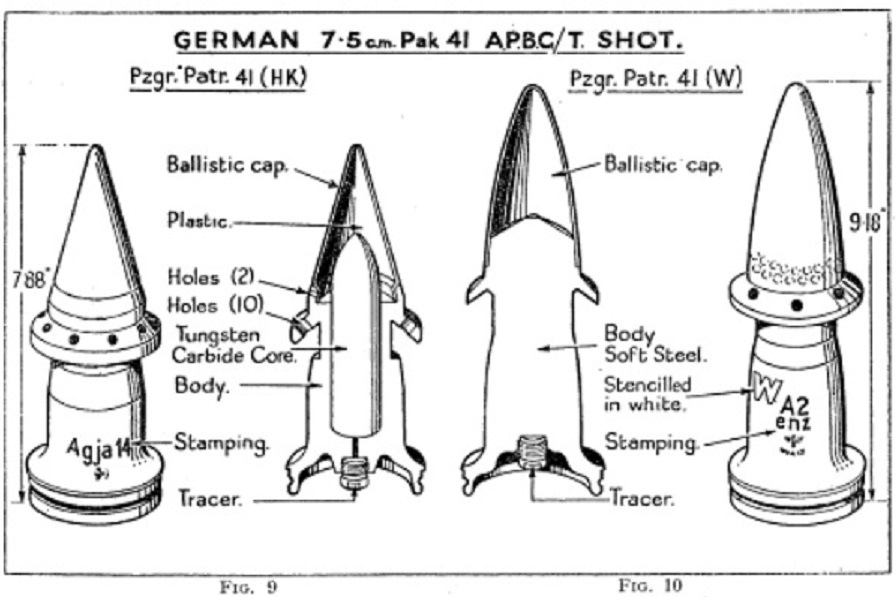
Sub-caliber squeeze bore projectiles. Here seen in two examples: an armor-piercing composite non-rigid projectile with a tungsten core, and a regular armor-piercing non-rigid projectile without a tungsten core.

A common method during World War Two, often called the Gerlich-, Littlejohn- or tapered bore principle, was to fit sub-caliber ammunition with soft metal flanges filling out the missing caliber and then fire them from squeeze bore barrels. Squeeze bore barrels, often found on shotguns (see Choke (firearms)), progressively decreases its bore diameter towards the muzzle, resulting in a reduced final bore. When fired the flanges on the projectile would fold inwards as it travels through the reducing inner diameter of the squeeze bore.

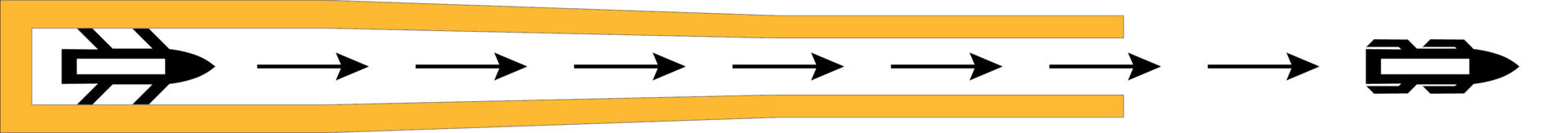
Diagram of the flange method

=== Flanged sub-caliber ammunition types ===
- Armor-piercing composite non-rigid (APCNR)
- Armor-piercing non-rigid (APNR)

== Sub-caliber barrel ==
A third method is to simply fit a smaller barrel into the original full caliber weapon which then allows the firing of smaller caliber cartridges. This is called sub-caliber training and it is used to lower the cost of training with large caliber weapons by allowing them to fire cheaper lower caliber ammunition and to not put wear on the original barrel.
