= Squeeze bore =

Weapon type

Historical squeeze bore example:

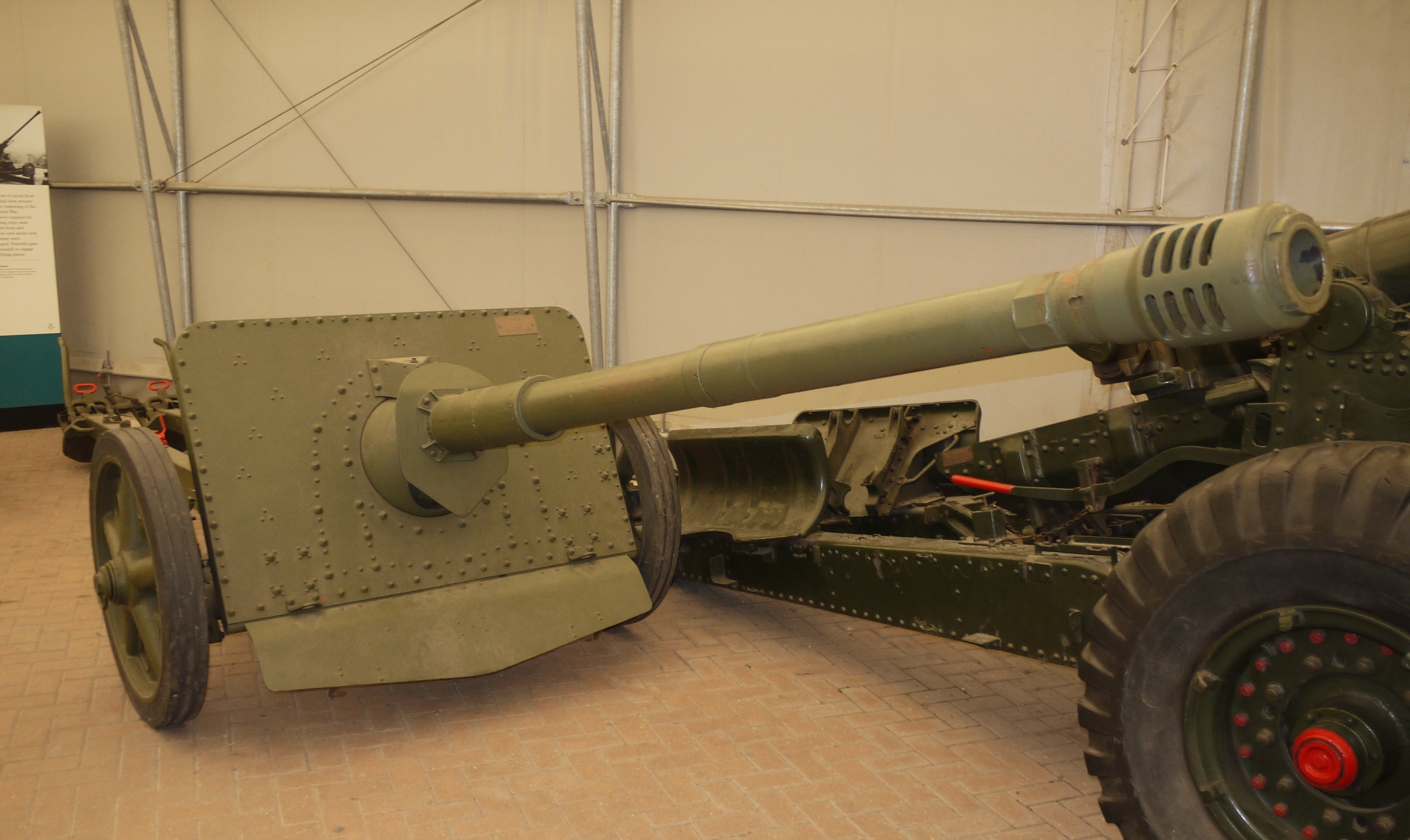
7.5 cm Pak 41 squeeze bore gun

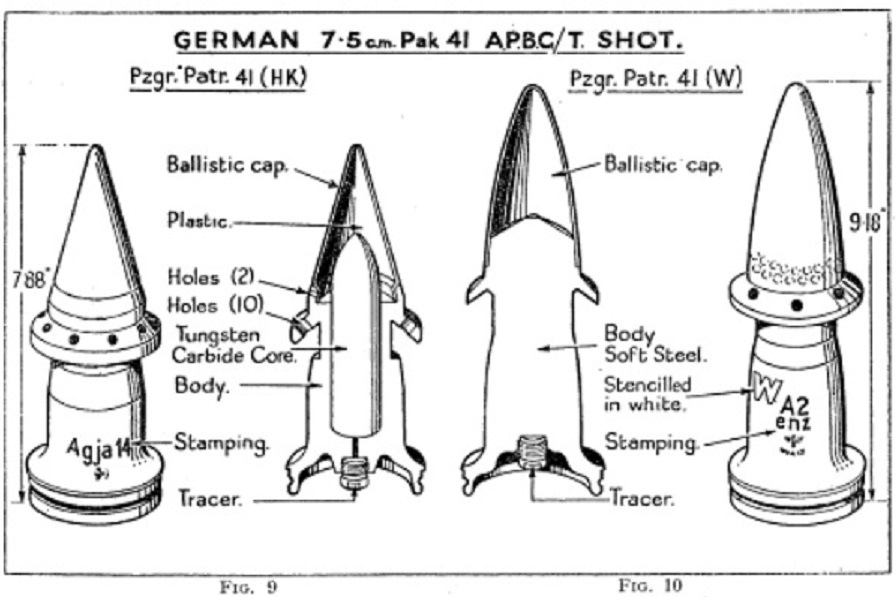
7.5 cm Pak 41 flange-projectiles.
Left: Armor-piercing composite non-rigid (APCNR)
Right: Armor-piercing (AP)

A squeeze bore, alternatively taper-bore, cone barrel or conical barrel, is a weapon where the internal barrel diameter progressively decreases towards the muzzle, resulting in a reduced final internal diameter. These weapons are used in conjunction with special sub-caliber ammunition where the projectile is fitted with soft-metal flanges which fill out the caliber. As the projectile travels through the squeeze bore, the flanges fold inward, resulting in a reduced caliber round with an increased velocity compared to a traditional full-caliber round.

== Mechanism ==
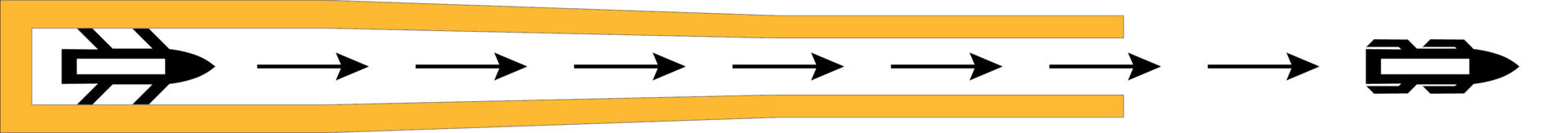
Diagram of the squeeze-bore concept

A squeeze bore utilizes the energy of the propellant to squeeze the diameter of the bullet or shell down, increasing penetration and velocity significantly. This process also means high chamber pressure and low barrel service life. For example, the service life of a squeeze bore 7.5 cm Pak 41 could be as low as 1000 rounds compared to 5000–7000 rounds for the 7.5 cm Pak 39 (L/48). The diameter of a fired shell could decrease as much as 40% from .50 caliber to .30 caliber (achieved in a version of the M2 machine gun). Rather than squeezing solid shot, this is accomplished through a hardened penetrator core (tungsten, for example) and a softer outer jacket (aluminium alloy) forming flanges or wings. This outer jacket is crushed as the projectile leaves the barrel.

The squeeze-bore concept typically was used in anti-tank guns before the widespread use of shaped charges. Later, the perfection of discarding-sabot ammo, which is based on the same concept of using a larger-caliber barrel to fire a smaller-caliber projectile at high speed, negated the need for the squeeze-bore concept.

== History and usage ==
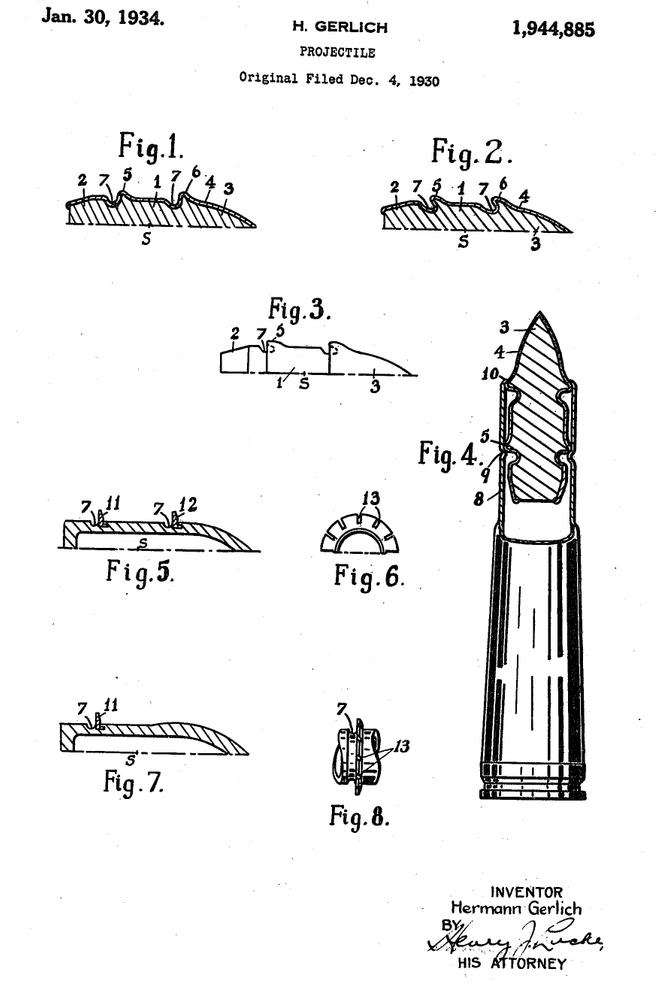
The original patent filed by Hermann Gerlich in 1932

The squeeze-bore concept was first patented by German inventor Carl Puff in 1903, even though the general principle was known already in 19th century and later applied in lighter fashion on Armstrong guns, on which only the muzzle (not the barrel itself) was of slightly smaller diameter (to cast off the sealing leather bag that the powder cartridge was folded into). Later, Hermann Gerlich in the 1920s and 1930s experimented with the concept, resulting in an experimental 7-centimetre anti-tank rifle with a 1,800-metre-per-second (5,900 ft/s) muzzle velocity. This led to the squeeze-bore concept sometimes being called the "Gerlich principle". He also made and sold hunting rifles based on the principle.

In 1939–40, Mauser-Werk AG produced the 2.8 cm sPzB 41 and Krupp (in 1941) produced the 7.5 cm Pak 41. These were eventually discontinued due to the lack of tungsten and manufacturing complexity for the ammunition. Imperial Japan would attempt to create their own version of the Pak 41, known as the Type Ge, but it would not enter production.

Other uses of the squeeze bore include the British Littlejohn adaptor, a QF 6-pounder adapter, and a version of the M2 machine gun produced during WW2, Squeezing down from 40mm to 30mm, 57mm to 42.6mm, and .50 caliber to .30 caliber respectively. The Littlejohn adapter was used to extend the service life of the QF 2-pounder and was designed by František Janeček whose anglicized name gave the Littlejohn its designation. The QF 6-pounder adapter was never adopted.

Firearms with Squeeze bore barrels are more likely to function without blank-firing adapters using blank rounds as the pressure is congregated at the muzzle.

== Gallery ==
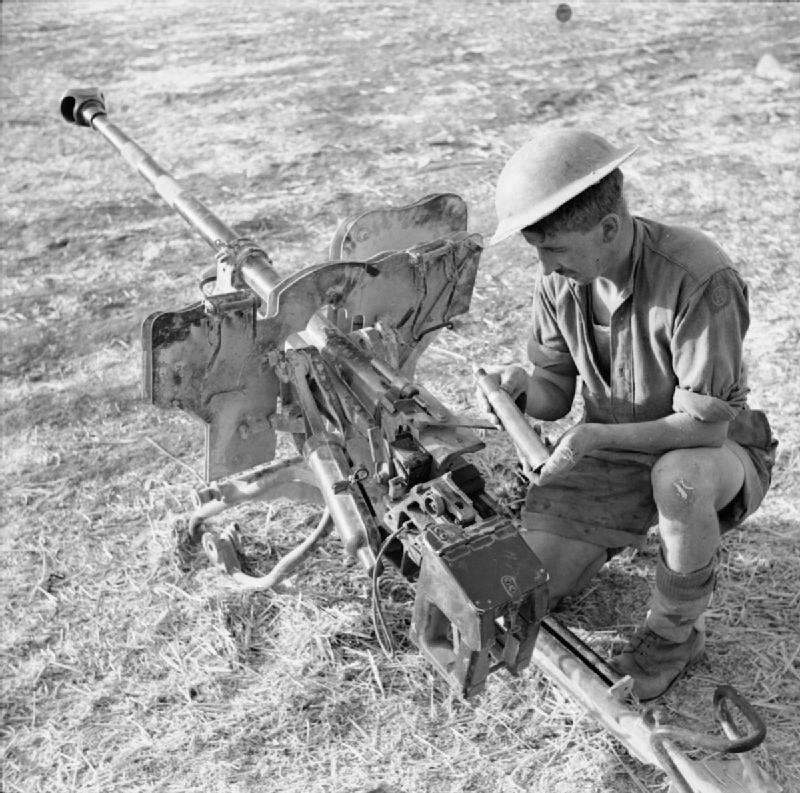
2.8 cm sPzB 41 squeeze-bore anti-tank gun captured by British forces in Sicily 1943.

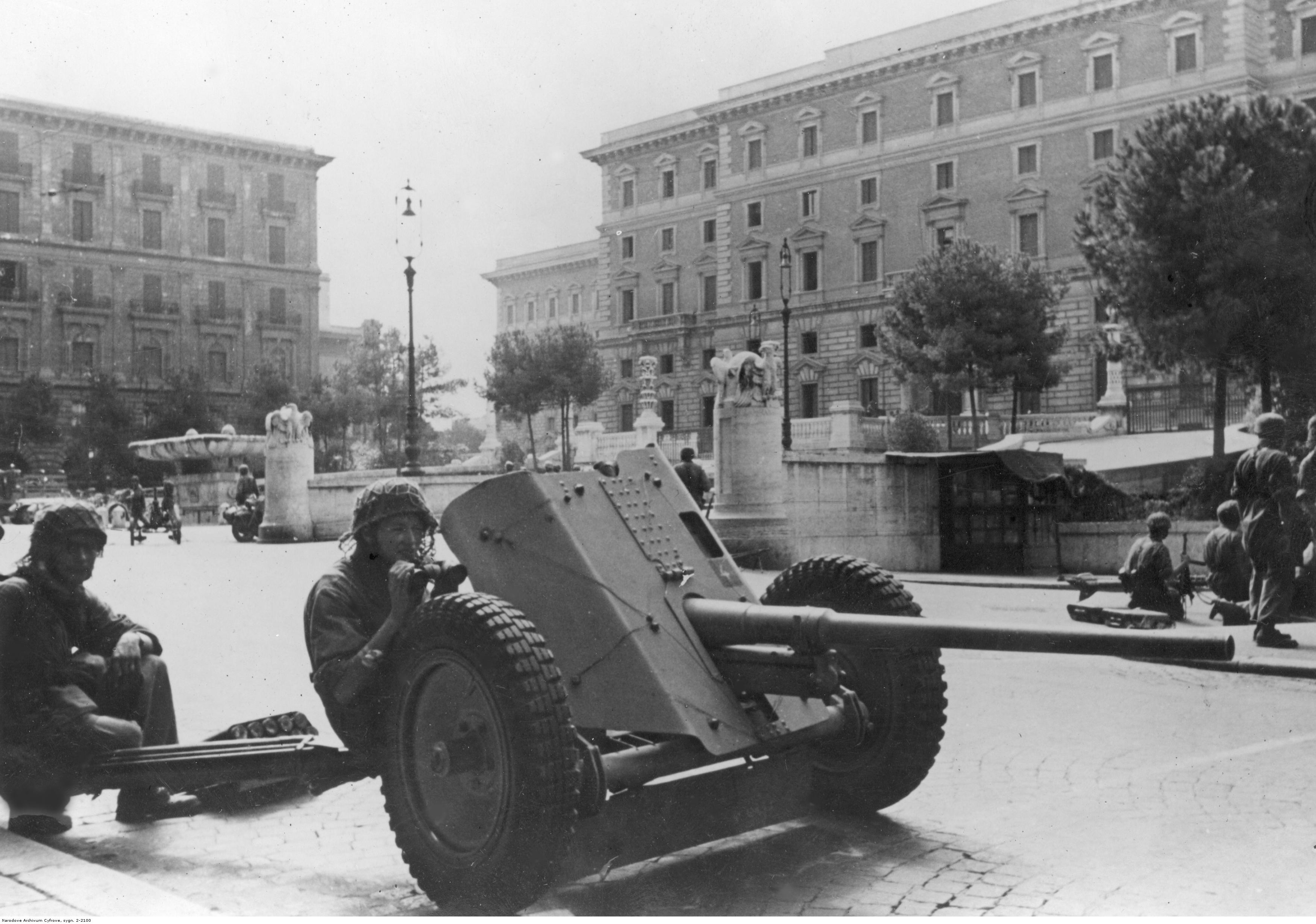
4.2 cm Pak 41 light squeeze-bore anti-tank gun in Italy 1943.

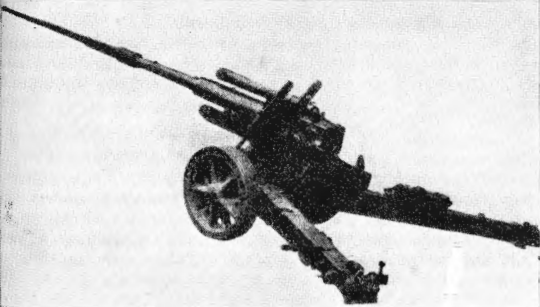
A German 10 cm schwere Kanone 18 with an 8,8 cm squeeze-bore adapter attached to the muzzle.

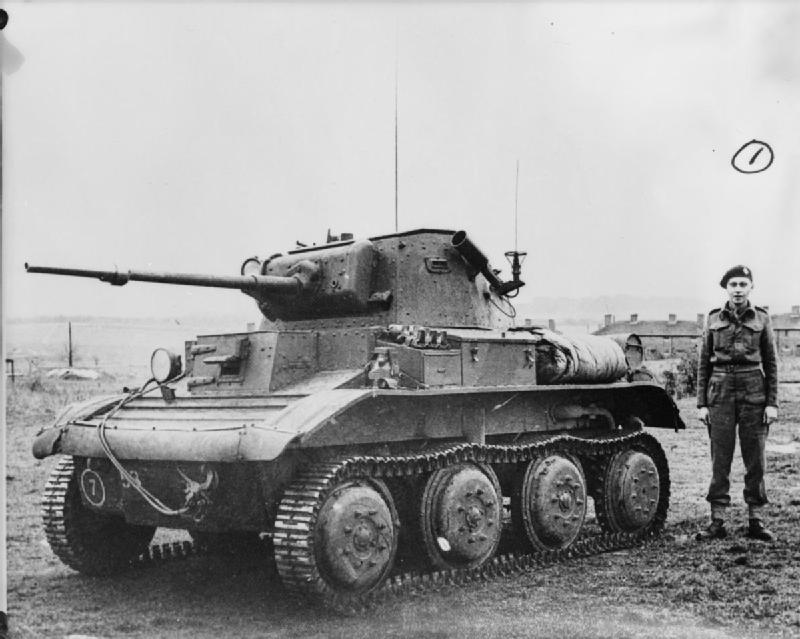
An Mk VII Tetrarch Mk I with a squeeze-bore Littlejohn adaptor.

== See also ==
- Choke (firearms)
- Slug barrel

Squeeze bore artillery

- 2.8 cm sPzB 41
- 4.2 cm Pak 41
- 7.5 cm Pak 41
