= Armour-piercing discarding sabot =

Anti-tank projectile

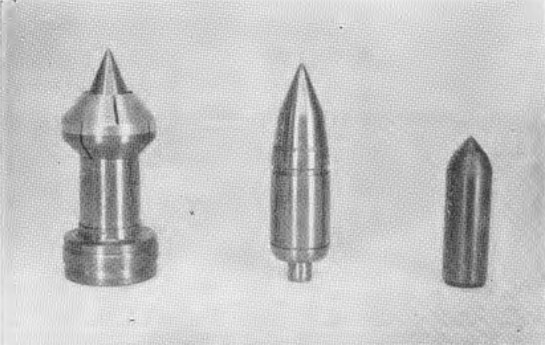
Swedish "37/24 mm slpprj m/49" APDS projectile for the Bofors 37 mm anti-tank gun from 1949. 37/24 indicates full-caliber with sabot and sub-caliber without sabot — 37 / 24 mm (1.46 / 0.945 in). Left object shows the projectile with the sabot, central object shows projectile without the sabot, and the right object is the projectile's tungsten core.

Armor-piercing discarding sabot (APDS) is a type of spin-stabilized kinetic energy projectile for anti-armor warfare. Each projectile consists of a sub-caliber round fitted with a sabot. The combination of a lighter sub-caliber projectile with a full-caliber propellant charge allows for an increase in muzzle velocity compared to full-caliber rounds, giving the round increased armor-penetration performance. To further enhance their armor-penetration capabilities, APDS rounds typically feature a hardened core made from tungsten or another hard, dense material.

For a given caliber, APDS ammunition can effectively double the armor penetration of a gun when compared to full-caliber rounds such as AP, Armor-piercing Capped (APC), and Armor piercing Capped Ballistic Cap (APCBC) projectiles.

APDS-rounds were commonly used in large caliber tank guns up until the early 1980s, but have since been superseded by armor-piercing fin-stabilized discarding sabot (APFSDS) projectiles, which use fin-stabilization and can be fired from smoothbore guns. APDS rounds remain in use for small or medium calibers, such as in saboted light armour penetrator (SLAP) ammunition.

== History and development ==
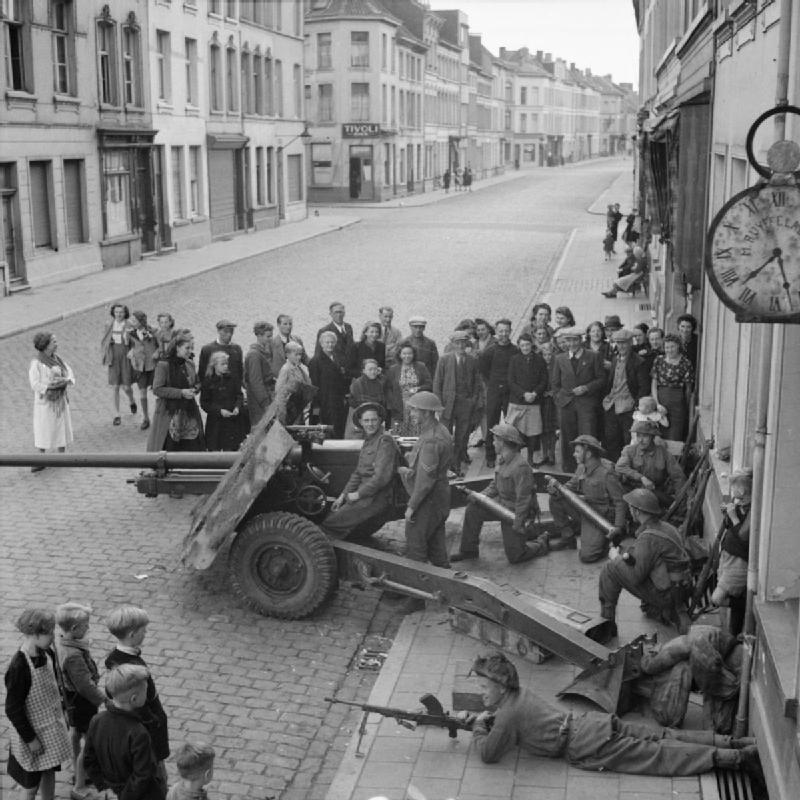
British soldiers manning a 76.2 mm Ordnance QF 17-pounder anti-tank gun during World War II. Third soldier from the left is holding an APDS round.

Armour piercing discarding sabot munitions were developed to increase penetrating performance of anti-tank projectiles by generating higher impact velocity. A larger projectile would require a completely new weapon system, but increasing velocity faced the limitation that steel armour-piercing (AP) projectiles shattered at velocities above about 850 m/s when uncapped. Tungsten carbide, with twice the density of steel, was seen as a solution, due to its greater hardness and ability to withstand shock and pressure, but its greater weight reduced velocity.

In the 1930s, to increase terminal velocity without increasing diameter, engineers working for the French Edgar Brandt company developed "saboted" ammunition, in which a heavier sub-calibre core was surrounded by a lightweight "sabot" (the French word for a clog or the hard outer layer of hooves; however Brandt himself used term "propulsive basal member" in his English patents), that was retained for the duration of the flight until impact. They fielded two calibres; the 75 mm/57 mm for the 75mm Mle 1897/33 anti-tank gun and 37 mm/25 mm for several 37 mm gun types just before the French-German armistice of 1940, before evacuating to the United Kingdom, to join ongoing anti-tank ammunition development efforts there. The British term for this construction was "Armour-Piercing, Composite Rigid" (APCR)

While the sabot improved short range effectiveness, the additional drag caused the performance of the shot to fall off dramatically with increasing range. Between 1941 and 1944, Permutter and Coppock, two designers with the UK Armaments Research Department (ARD), developed a sabot that was discarded immediately after leaving the barrel, so the smaller, heavier, sub-projectile could carry on at the much higher velocity, suffering less drag due to its smaller diameter.

In mid-1944, the resulting APDS (the 'D' standing for "discarding") projectile type was introduced into service for the UK's 57mm QF 6-pounder anti-tank gun and later in September 1944 for the 76mm QF 17-pounder anti-tank gun. (Note: Muzzle velocity of the 17 pdr when firing APDS was around 3,900 ft/s (1,200 m/s). Weight of the sub-calibre tungsten carbide projectiles was approximately 7 lb (3.1 kg), considerably less than the normal AP round's weight of 17 lb (7.7 kg).)

== Construction ==
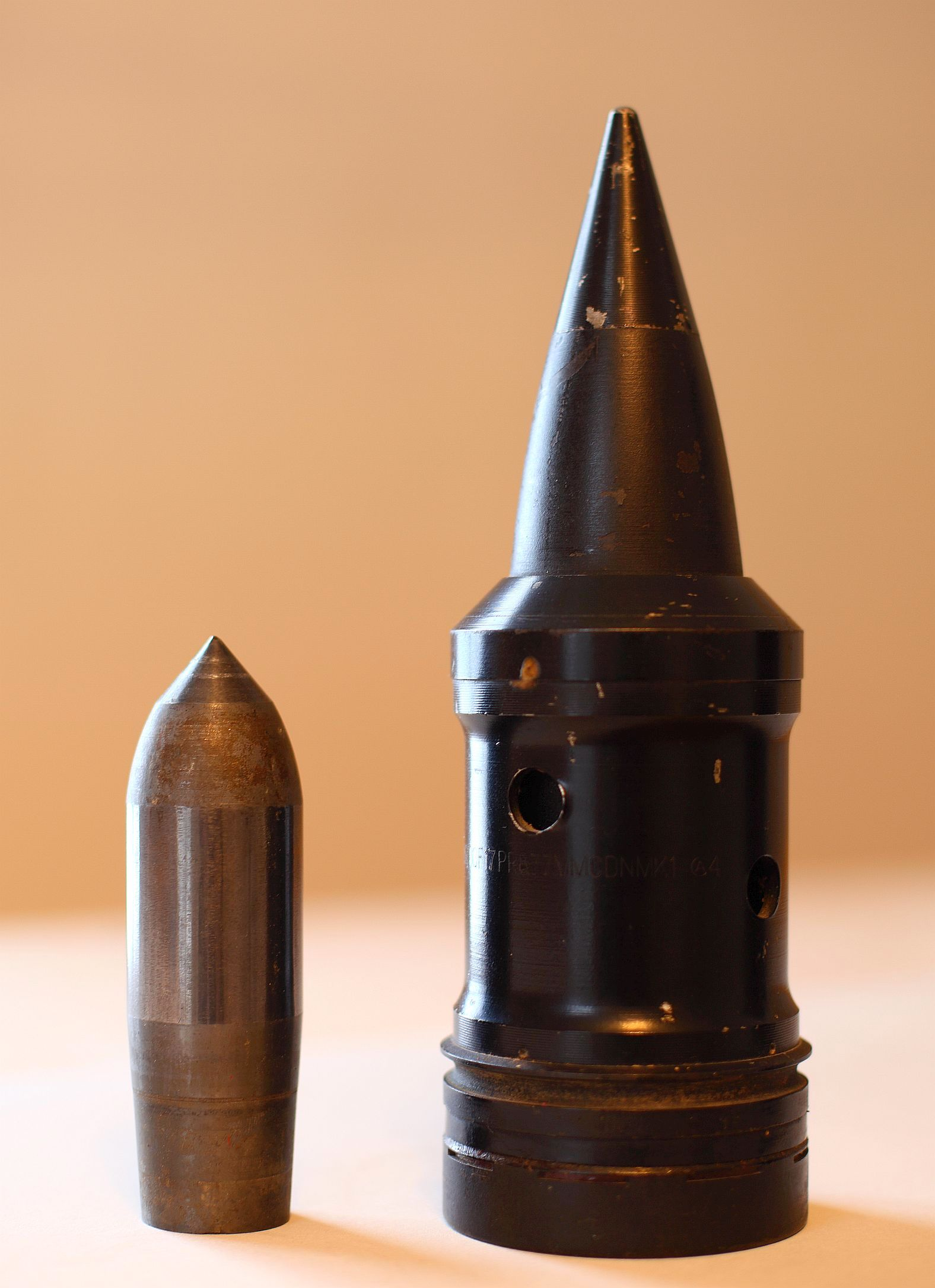
APDS projectile with tungsten core for a British WW2 76.2 mm Ordnance QF 17-pounder anti-tank gun

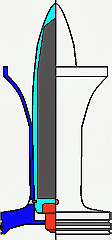
APDS diagram

=== Sabot construction ===
The sabot of a large calibre APDS consists of a light, high-strength alloy, full diameter "pot" and base unit, which are screwed together. The front part of the pot has three to four petals (sabots) which are covered with a centering band (often a nylon derivative). The rear half has a rubber obturator and driving band (again nylon) held in place by the screw-in base unit. The base unit, if a tracer element is attached to the sub-projectile, has a hole located at the center. Before firing, the sub-projectile and sabot are locked together.

Due to the high setback forces (g-forces), friction between the pot and sub-projectile allows spin to be transferred, thus stabilising the sub-projectile. Small/medium calibre APDS use a lightweight high strength alloy base pot and three or more plastic petals. To transfer the spin to the core in small/medium calibre weapons, the core tends to have a notch at its base. Under bore acceleration, which can be higher than 100,000 g, the uneven base is forced into the softer pot material, locking the sub-projectile to the pot and imparting spin.

Not all small/medium calibre APDS rely on this technique, another method for spin coupling is by using the forward plastic petals. The petals are of a slightly larger diameter than the lands in the rifled bore. This forces the petals tightly against the core, increasing the friction between them and allowing the spin to be transferred.

=== Projectile construction ===
The sub-calibre projectile consists of a high density core with a penetrating cap, enclosed within a high strength sheath (steel) with a lightweight alloy (aluminium-magnesium alloy) ballistic cap. For modern small/medium calibre APDS projectiles, the core is not sheathed and the ballistic and penetrating caps are combined. A tracer element may be added to the APDS sub-projectile, for large calibre weapons this is part of the outer sheath, for small/medium calibre weapons it is contained within a hollow cavity in, or attached to, the base of the core.

Most modern APDS projectiles use high strength shock resistant tungsten alloys. The main constituent is tungsten, alloyed or sintered with/to cobalt, copper, iron, or nickel. Very few APDSes use depleted uranium (DU) titanium alloy for the penetrator material, though the retired 20 mm MK149-2 Phalanx CIWS round did use DU.

== Function ==
=== Discarding of sabot ===
When a large caliber APDS is fired and while still within the bore, the setback forces shear the forward petals, partly unlocking the sub-projectile from the sabot, but still holding it rigidly within the pot. Gas pressure is used to delay the unlocking of the pins holding the rear part of the sub-projectile by gyroscopic forces. Once outside the barrel, the pins, centering band and forward petals are released or discarded by projectile spin, the aerodynamic drag removes the pot/base unit.

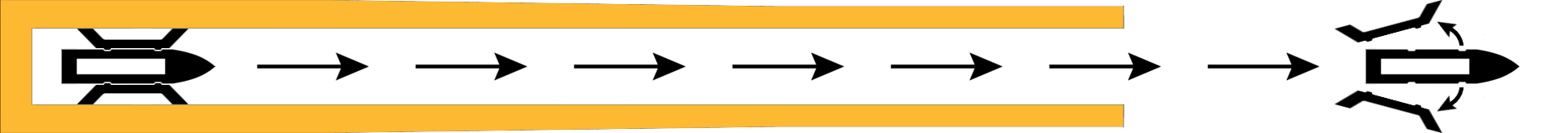
Diagram showing the operation of the discarding sabot on APDS-projectiles. This example uses a "spindle-sabot".

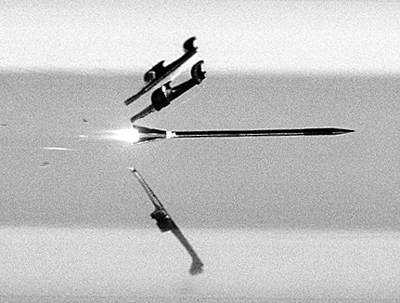
A modern APFSDS-T projectile shortly after muzzle exit, just as the sabot petals are separating from the penetrator.

As an APDS sub-projectile does not require driving bands and the core is supported at the base and ogive region, a far more aerodynamic projectile shape can be chosen. This, in combination with the sub-projectile's higher sectional density, gives the resulting sub-projectile vastly reduced aerodynamic drag in comparison to full-caliber tungsten-core projectiles, such as armour-piercing, composite rigid (APCR). Both the higher initial velocity and the reduced drag result in higher velocity at impact. This also lowers flight time and improves accuracy. Accuracy can suffer if there are unwanted sabot/sub-projectile interactions during discard.

=== Impact example ===
The sequence upon impact of the APDS projectile, for example the 120 mm L11, as used on the Chieftain tank, fired L15 APDS (muzzle velocity 1370 m/s), goes as follows: the lightweight ballistic cap is crushed, the penetrating cap then strikes the armour, distributing the shock across the whole surface of the core's nose, reducing the initial shock experienced by the core. The steel sheath surrounding the core peels away, and the core goes on to penetrate the armour. The penetration of the L15 APDS is approximately 355 mm of rolled homogeneous armour at 1000 m.

== FAPDS ==
During penetration, a frangible projectile's core, a high density alloy, fragments into many high-velocity pieces. The resulting projectiles are called Frangible Armour Piercing Discarding Sabot (FAPDS) for APDS types, or FRAP (Frangible Armour Piercing) for full-calibre projectiles. As of 2010, Diehl Defence called its FAPDS a "Penetrator with Enhanced Lateral Effect" (PELE). It was developed with Rheinmetall.

The effect of a frangible projectile on a lightly armoured target is much the same as a high explosive incendiary round, but with a cloud of dense, high-velocity fragments penetrating deeper into the target's interior. Upon striking heavy armour the effect of FAPDS is more akin to a standard APDS, albeit with higher fragmentation of the core, and hence lethality if the armour is perforated.
