= 7.5 cm Pak 41 =

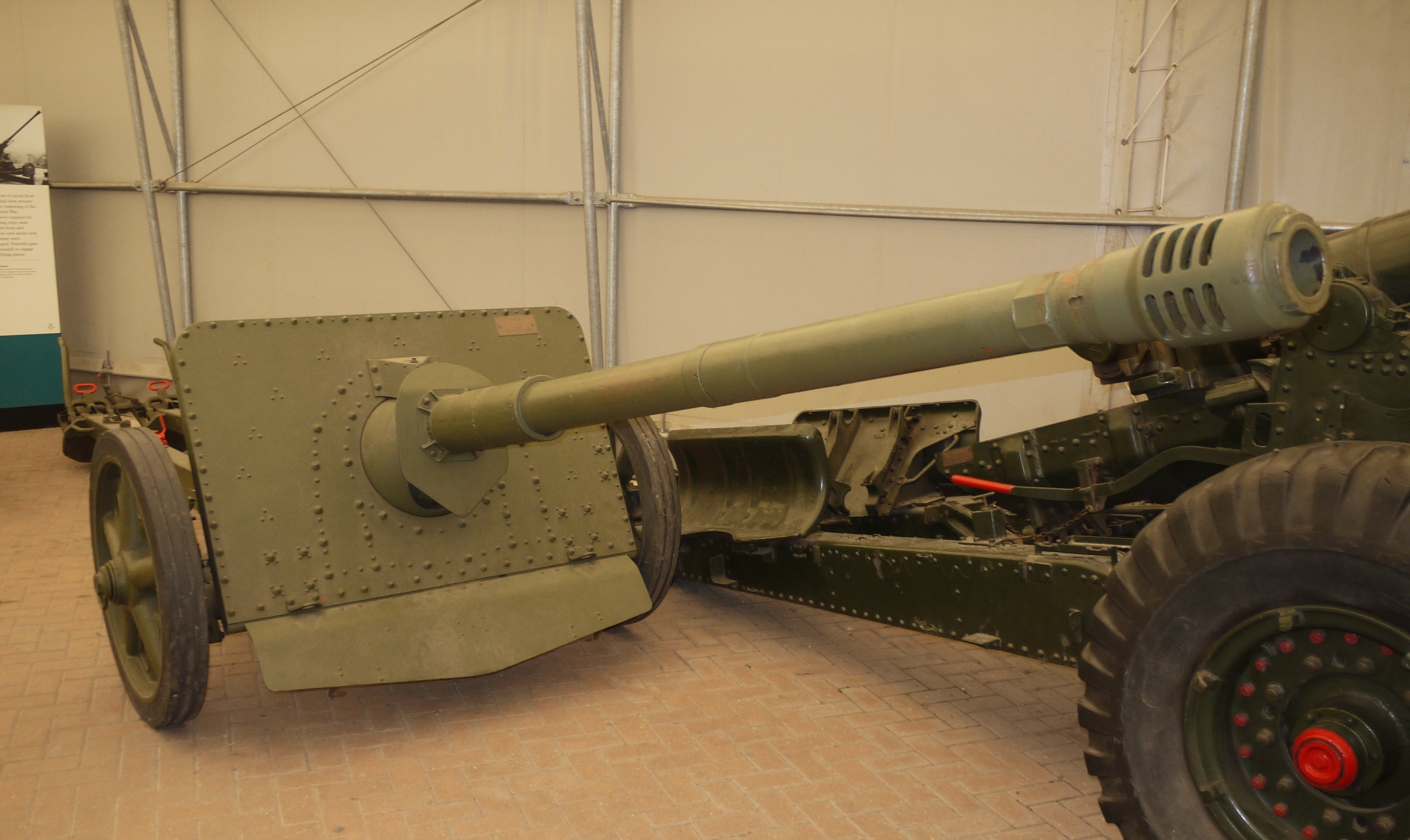
- A preserved 7.5 cm PaK 41
- Type: Anti-tank gun
- Place of origin: Nazi Germany

Service history
- Used by: Nazi Germany
- Wars: World War II

Production history
- Designer: Krupp, Essen
- Produced: 1941-1943
- No. built: 150

Specifications
- Mass: 1,390 kg (3,064 lbs)
- Length: 4.325 m (14 ft 2.3 in)
- Barrel length: 2.95 m (9 ft 8 in)
- Crew: 5
- Shell: Fixed QF 75×543 mm R
- Shell weight: 2.5 kg (5 lb 8 oz)
- Caliber: 75 mm (2.95 in) reducing to 55 mm (2.16 in); 57 caliber length
- Carriage: Split-trail
- Elevation: –12.5° to +16°
- Traverse: 60°
- Muzzle velocity: AP 1,230 m/s (4,035 ft/s)
- Effective firing range: 2,000 m (2,185 yds)
- Feed system: single shot, breech loading
- Sights: sighted up to 1500 m

The 7.5 cm Pak 41 was one of the last German anti-tank guns brought into service and used in World War II and notable for being one of the largest anti-tank guns to rely on the Gerlich principle (pioneered by the German gun-designer Hermann Gerlich, who developed the principle in the 1920s, reportedly for a hunting rifle) to deliver a higher muzzle velocity and therefore greater penetration in relation to its size.

It is similar to, but distinct from, the Waffe 0725, which, while also based on the Gerlich principle, had a different barrel calibre.

== Design and development ==
Designed and built by Krupp AG to compete with the Rheinmetall 7.5 cm Pak 40, the Pak 41 was intended from the onset to take advantage of the Gerlich principle to increase shot velocity. In addition to its squeeze bore design and the use of a tungsten core flanged shell, the Pak 41 incorporated several novel features. One feature was that the barrel was split into three distinct sections: the rear part was parallel-sided and conventionally rifled; the central part was unrifled and tapered down; at the muzzle end, the last 70 cm were parallel-sided again but remained unrifled. Another novel feature was the attachment of the split trail legs and solid rubber tires directly to the Gun shield to save weight. The gun cradle was set inside a special ball mount attached to the Gun shield. The cradle itself was cylindrical, covering the whole of the rear half of the barrel.

The weight of the powder charge fired is 95 percent of the weight of the projectile, which had an estimated velocity of approximately 1200 m/s (4,000 f/s), and a penetration of 15 cm (5.94 inches) of homogeneous armor at 900 m (1,000 yards). The reinforced breech is of the vertical wedge type, with a semi-automatic action. Compared to the PaK 38 and the PaK 40, the appearance was long, low, and sturdy.

The gun is sighted up to 1,500 meters; the sight has four scales for use according to the actual muzzle velocity of the gun. The barrel life of the tapered section was provisionally estimated as 500 rounds and the section was designed to be replaced in the field.

== Service ==
When first introduced, the 7.5 cm Pak 41's performance would seem to indicate that it might supplant the Pak 40 as the standard issue anti-tank gun for the Wehrmacht. However, the emergent shell's velocity tended to drop dramatically over long range and accuracy and penetration suffered as a consequence. This factor, along with a growing shortage of tungsten, which was needed for the gun's special ammunition, would ensure that only 150 Pak 41's would ever be produced. Most Pak 41's were scrapped when their barrels had worn out and / or their ammunition supply was exhausted, although it is believed that a small number of Pak 41's were converted to accept 7.5 cm Pak 40 barrels and components.

A small number were known to have been mounted on halftracks and used as lightly armored tank destroyers.

One example is known of a Pak 41 being fitted on top of a Panzer III chassis, most possibly as a field modification.

== Ammunition ==
=== Pzgr 41 (HK) ===
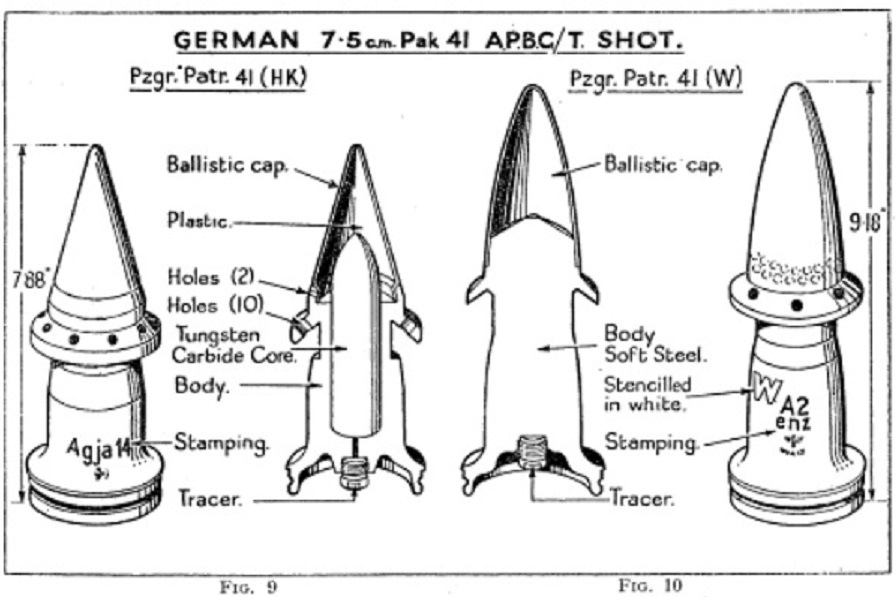
German 7,5 cm Pak 41 APCNR Shot

An armour-piercing, composite, non-rigid projectile with a sub-calibre tungsten core and tracer.

- Weight of projectile: 2.6 kg
- Muzzle velocity: 1230 m/s

Range	Penetration at 30 degrees from vertical
100 m	198 mm
500 m	172 mm
1000 m	140 mm
1500 m	n/a

=== Pzgr 41 (W) - APCNR ===
An armour-piercing, non-rigid projectile with tracer for practice only.

- Weight of projectile: 2.5 kg
- Muzzle velocity: 1230 m/s

Range	Penetration at 30 degrees from vertical
100 m	97 mm
500 m	80 mm
1000 m	70 mm
1500 m	60 mm

== See also ==
- Littlejohn adaptor

== References and sources ==
Notes

Sources

- Gander, Terry and Chamberlain, Peter. Weapons of the Third Reich: An Encyclopedic Survey of All Small Arms, Artillery and Special Weapons of the German Land Forces 1939-1945. New York: Doubleday, 1979 ISBN 0-385-15090-3
- Hogg, Ian V. German Artillery of World War Two. 2nd corrected edition. Mechanicsville, PA: Stackpole Books, 1997 ISBN 1-85367-480-X
