= 2.8 cm sPzB 41 =

German anti-tank gun

2.8 cm schwere Panzerbüchse 41
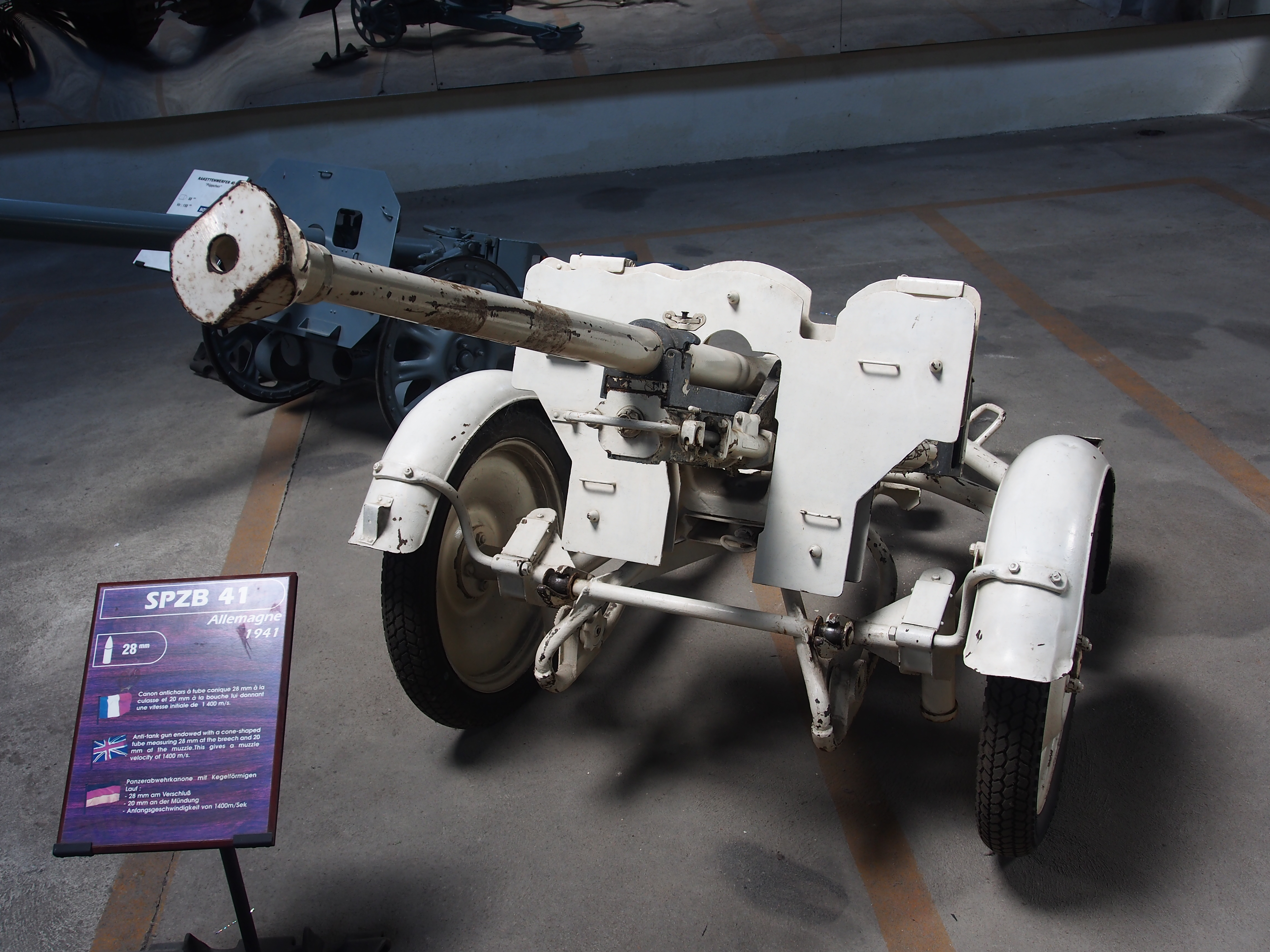
- 2.8 cm sPzB 41 at the Musée des Blindés.
- Type: Anti-tank gun
- Place of origin: Nazi Germany

Service history
- In service: 1941–1945
- Used by: Nazi Germany
- Wars: World War II

Production history
- Designed: 1939–1940
- Manufacturer: Mauser-Werke AG
- Unit cost: 4,500 RM
- Produced: 1940–1943
- No. built: 2,797

Specifications
- Mass: 229 kg (505 lbs)
- Length: 2.69 m (8 ft 10 in)
- Barrel length: overall:1.73 m (5 ft 8 in) (with muzzle brake)
- Width: 96.5 cm (3 ft 2 in)
- Height: 83.8 cm (2 ft 9 in)
- Crew: 3
- Shell: Fixed QF 28×187mm R
- Caliber: 28/20 mm (1.10/.78 in)
- Breech: horizontal-block
- Recoil: Hydro-spring
- Carriage: Split trail
- Elevation: -5° to 30°
- Traverse: 70°
- Rate of fire: up to 30 rpm
- Muzzle velocity: 4,500 feet per second (1,400 m/s)
- Effective firing range: 500 m (547 yds)

2.8 cm schwere Panzerbüchse 41 (sPzB 41) or "Panzerbüchse 41" was a German anti-tank weapon working on the squeeze bore principle. Officially classified as a heavy anti-tank rifle (German: schwere Panzerbüchse), it would be better described, and is widely referred to, as a light anti-tank gun.

== Description ==
Although the sPzB 41 was classified as a heavy anti-tank rifle, its construction was much more typical of an anti-tank gun. Like the latter, it had a recoil mechanism, carriage and shield. The only significant feature the weapon had in common with anti-tank rifles was a lack of elevation and traverse mechanisms—the light barrel could be easily manipulated manually.

The squeeze bore design was based on a tapering barrel, with the caliber reducing from 28 mm at the chamber end to only 20 mm at the muzzle. The projectile carried two external flanges; as it proceeded toward the muzzle, the flanges were squeezed down, decreasing the diameter with the result that pressure did not drop off as quickly and the projectile was propelled to a higher velocity. The barrel construction resulted in a very high muzzle velocity - up to 1,400 m/s. The bore was fitted with a muzzle brake. The horizontal sliding breech block was "quarter-automatic": it closed automatically once a shell was loaded, but unlike semi-automatic guns, the fired shell casing had to be manually ejected by opening the breech block. The gun was equipped with an open sight for distances up to 500m; a telescopic sight, the ZF 1х11 from the 3.7 cm Pak 36 anti-tank gun, could also be fitted.

The recoil system consisted of a hydraulic recoil buffer and spring-driven recuperator. The carriage was of the split trail type, with suspension. Wheels with rubber tires could be removed, making the gun significantly lower and therefore easier to conceal; the process took 30–40 seconds. The guns' construction allowed toolless dismantling to five pieces, the heaviest of which weighed 62 kg.

== Development and production history ==
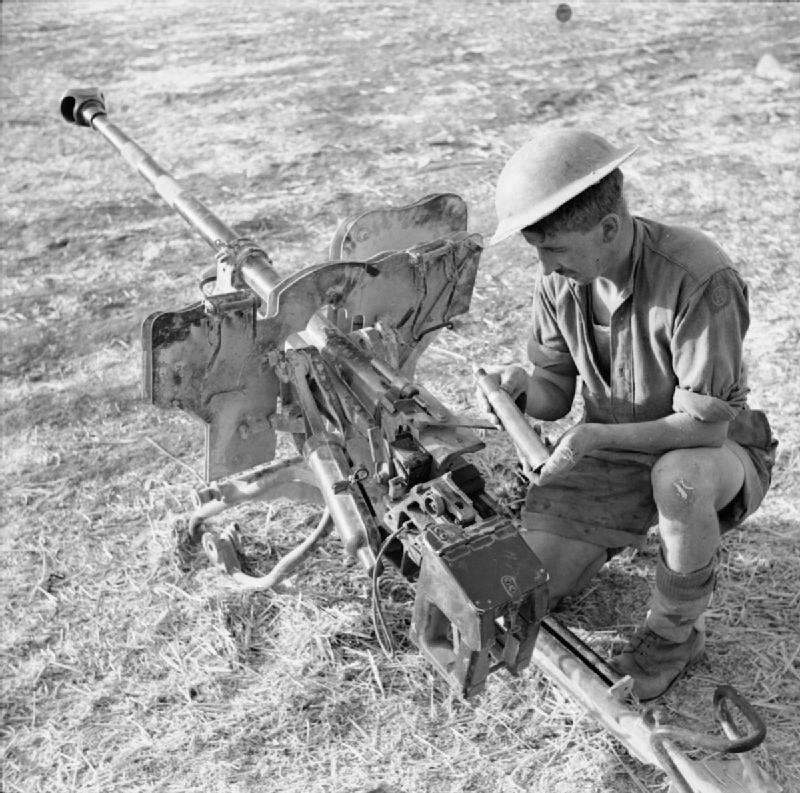
A British soldier examines a captured sPzB 41 anti-tank gun, near Catania, Sicily, 1943.

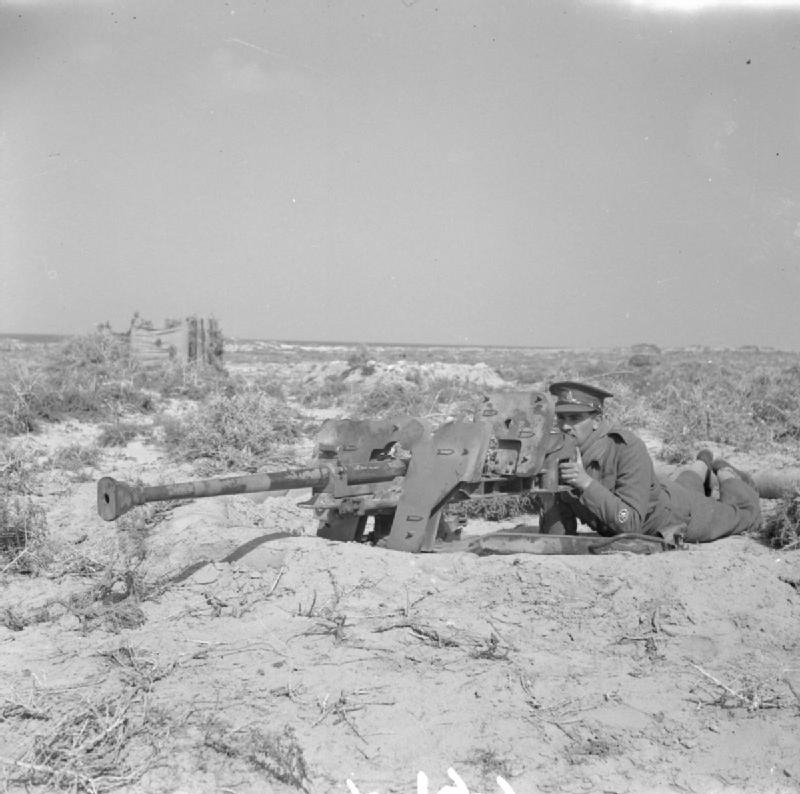
sPzB 41 captured by the British Army, 1942.

The cone-bore principle was first patented in 1903 by a German inventor, Carl Puff. In the 1920s and 1930s, another German engineer, Hermann Gerlich, conducted experiments with coned-bore barrels that resulted in an experimental 7 mm anti-tank rifle with a muzzle velocity of 1,800 m/s.

Based on these works, Mauser-Werke AG developed a 28/20 mm anti-tank weapon initially designated Gerät 231 or MK.8202 in 1939–1940. In June–July 1940, an experimental batch of 94 (other sources say 30) pieces was given to the army for trials. They resulted in some modifications and in 1941 mass production of what became 2.8 cm schwere Panzerbüchse 41 started. One piece cost 4,520 Reichsmarks (for the sake of comparison, one 5 cm Pak 38 gun cost 10,600 Reichsmarks). The last gun was built in 1943; the main reason for the discontinuance was the lack of tungsten for projectiles.

Production of sPzB 41, pcs.
1940	1941	1942	1943	Total
94	349	1030	1324	2797

Production of ammunition for sPzB 41, thousands.
Shell type	1940	1941	1942	1943	Total
Fragmentation	-	9.2	373.3	130.1	512.6
Armour-piercing	156.2	889.5	270.0	278.1	1602.8

== Organization and employment ==
The sPzB 41 was used by some motorized divisions and by some Jäger (light infantry), Gebirgsjäger (mountain) and Fallschirmjäger (paratrooper) units. Some guns were supplied to anti-tank and sapper units. The weapon was employed on the Eastern Front from the beginning of hostilities (the Wehrmacht possessed 183 pieces on 1 June 1941), until the end of the war and also saw combat in the Italian campaign, the North African Campaign and on the Western Front in 1944–45.

== Variants ==
- 2.8 cm sPzB 41 leFl 41 (2.8 cm schwere Panzerbüchse 41 auf leichter Feldlafette 41): a variant developed for paratrooper units. It used a lightweight carriage without suspension; the wheels were replaced by small rollers; the shield was typically removed. The resulting weapon weighed only 139 kg (118 kg without rollers). The carriage supported a 360° field of fire, elevation ranged from -15° to 25°.
- 2.8 cm KwK 42: tank gun modification intended for the VK 903 turret. A Versuchs-Serie (developmental series) of twenty-four were produced, of which ten were reported as available for the VK 903 project on July 1, 1942. A total of 200 guns were ordered, though there is no evidence to show these were completed, nor is there evidence showing this weapon was ever actually mounted in a turret.

== Self-propelled mounts ==
The sPzB 41 was also mounted on several vehicles, such as cars, half-tracks and armored cars:

- Sd.Kfz. 221 armored cars;
- Sd.Kfz. 250/11 half-tracks;
- Sd.Kfz. 251 half-tracks;
- Horch 901 4x4 cross-country passenger cars;
- Horch Typ 40 (Kfz. 15) 4x4 cross-country passenger cars.

== Service ==
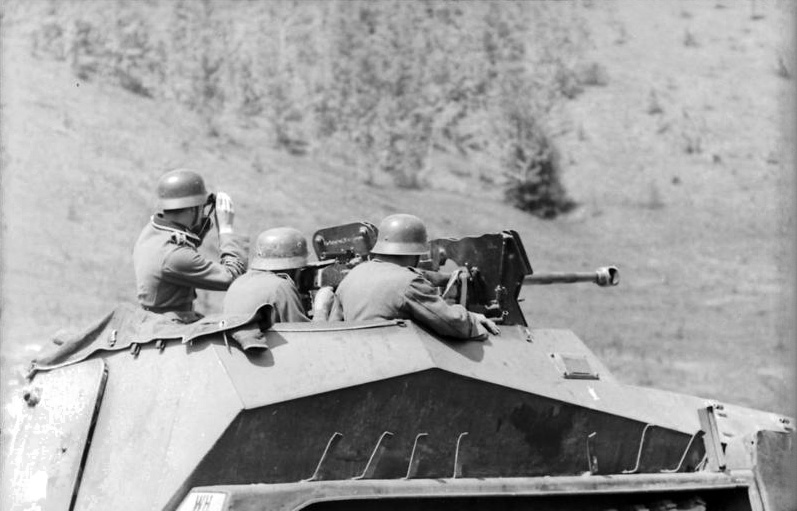
Sd.Kfz. 250/11 of Großdeutschland Division, Eastern Front, 1943.

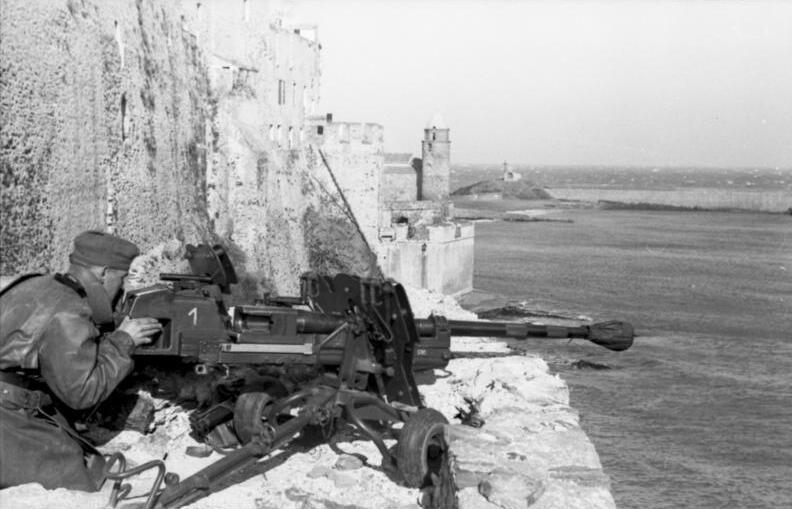
2.8 cm sPzB 41 le Fl 41, France, 1942.

Squeeze bore guns saw only limited use in World War II. Manufacturing such weapons was impossible without advanced technologies and high production standards. Besides Germany, the only country to bring such weapons to mass production was Britain, with the Littlejohn adaptor which, although not a gun in itself, used the same principle. An attempt by a Soviet design bureau headed by V. G. Grabin in 1940, failed because of technological problems. In the US, reports about the sPzB 41 inspired a series of experiments with 28/20 barrels and taper bore adaptors for the 37 mm Gun M3; the work started in September 1941 and continued throughout the war, with no practical success.

The sPzB 41 combined good anti-armor performance at short range (for example, at least once a shot penetrated the lower front plate of the heavy IS-1) and a high rate of fire with small, lightweight (for anti-tank gun), dismantleable construction. However, it also had several shortcomings, such as:

- The barrel was hard to manufacture and had a short service life (about 500 rounds)
- It had a very weak fragmentation shell
- Its use of tungsten for armor-piercing shells
- It had a short effective range
- Its relatively weak beyond-armour effect

Some authors that criticize the sPzB 41 concentrate mainly on the short service life of its barrel. High-velocity guns with "normal" barrel construction also had a short service life, e.g. for the Soviet 57-mm ZiS-2 it was about 1,000 shots. In the end, the factor that brought production of the sPzB 41 to a halt was the shortage of tungsten.

== Ammunition ==
There were two shell types for the taper-bore sPzB 41: the armor-piercing 2.8 cm Pzgr.41 and the fragmentation 2.8 cm Sprg.41, shown left and right respectively in the illustration below.

The Pzgr.41 had a tungsten carbide core, a softer steel casing and a magnesium alloy ballistic cap. The core was 40 mm long and 10.9 mm in diameter.

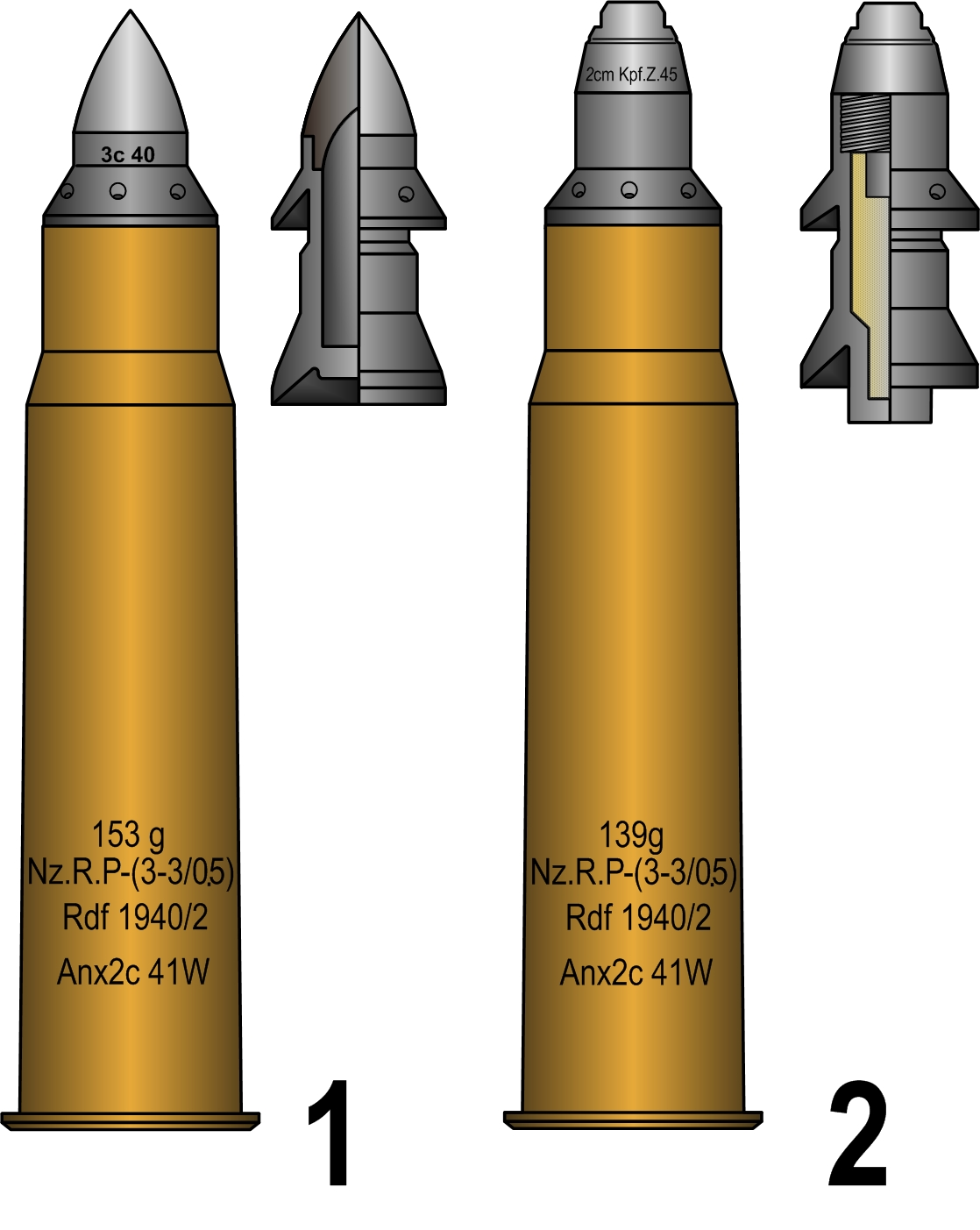
View of cartridges and projectiles for 2.8 cm sPzB 41

Available ammunition
Type	Model	Weight, kg	Filler	Muzzle velocity, m/s	Range, m
APCNR-T	2.8 cm Pzgr.41	0.125	-	1,430	500
Fragmentation	2.8 cm Sprg.41	0.093	5 g, phlegmatized PETN	1,400	1,000

Armour penetration table
APCNR-T projectile 2.8 cm Pzgr.41
Distance, m	Meet angle 60°, mm	Meet angle 90°, mm
100	52 – 69	75
300	46
400		40
500	40 – 52
