= JAL =

JAL or Jal may refer to:

== Entertainment ==
- Jal (band), a Pakistani pop/rock band
- Jal (film), a 2014 Indian Hindi-language film by Girish Malik about water scarcity, starring Purab Kohli and Kirti Kulhari
- Jal Fazer, a character in the British TV series Skins
- "Jal", an episode of the British TV series Skins

== Places ==
- Jal, New Mexico, a town in New Mexico, U.S.
- Jalisco, México
- Jal-e Akhund Mahalleh, Iran
- Jal-e Chala Sar, Iran
- Jal, Oman

== Other uses ==
- Auguste Jal (1795–1873), French historian
- Japan Airlines, ICAO airline designator, and abbreviation: JAL
- JAL (compiler), Just Another Language, a compiler for the PIC microcontroller
- Cyclone Jal, a storm that hit South India during November 2010
- El Lencero Airport in Xalapa, Veracruz, Mexico (IATA code: JAL)

== See also ==
- Jala (disambiguation)
- Jaal (disambiguation)
- Jalpari (disambiguation)
