= Jhalawad =

Jhalawad may refer to the following entities in India :

- Jhalawar, a city in Rajasthan
  - Jhalawar district, a district in Rajasthan
  - Jhalawar State, former princely state in Hadoti region of Rajasthan
  - Jhalawar City railway station
  - Jhalawar Road railway station
  - Jhalawar Lok Sabha constituency (defunct)
  - Jhalawar–Baran Lok Sabha constituency
- Jhalawad, a town in Gujarat
  - Kingdom of Jhalavad the former princely state in Gujarat, which was renamed Dhrangadhra State after its capital was transferred
    - Jhalawad prant, one of the ten historical and for British Raj-preserved prants (regions) of Kathiawar, along Halar, Sorath and Gohelwad
      - hence still nickname of Surendranagar district, also in Gujarat, as many of its princely states

== See also ==
- Jwala (disambiguation)
- Jala (disambiguation)
- Jhala, fast-paced conclusions of raga in Hindustani classical music
- Jhala (clan), a Rajput clan of Rajasthan and Gujarat, India
- Wad (disambiguation)
- Wada (disambiguation)
- Jhalarapatan, a city in Rajasthan
- Jhalar, Indian decorative fabric strip
- Jhalwara railway station, Madhya Pradesh, India
