= Jala =

Jala may refer to:

- Jala, Iran or Jalabi, a village in Hormozgan Province, Iran
- Jala, Nayarit, a municipality in Mexico
- Jala, Hebron, Palestinian village on the West Bank
- Jala (kuih), a traditional snack in Malaysia and Brunei
- Jala (water) or Ap, Vedic term for water in Hinduism
- Jala Brat (born 1986), Bosnian rapper
- Jhala (clan) or Jala, a Rajput clan of Rajasthan and Gujarat, India

== See also ==
- Jal (disambiguation)
- Jaal (disambiguation)
- Jalaa (disambiguation)
- Jhalawad (disambiguation)
- Jalam (film), a 2016 Indian film
