= Caliber (artillery) =

Measure of the size of a gun barrel

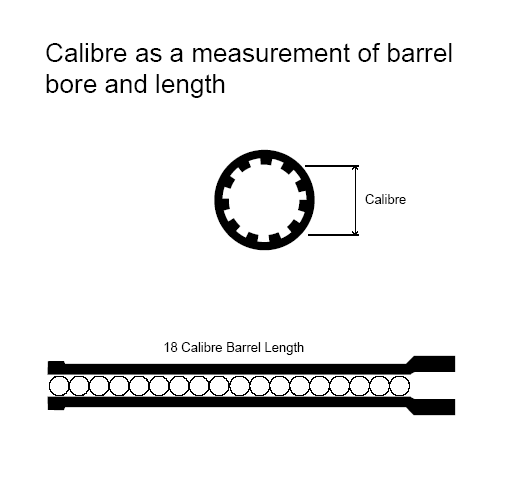
Relationship of caliber in bore and length of gun

In artillery, caliber or calibre (Note: Caliber is the American English spelling, while calibre is used in British English.) is the internal diameter of a gun barrel, or, by extension, a relative measure of the barrel length.

== Barrel length ==
The length of the barrel (especially for larger guns) is often quoted in multiples of the caliber, used, for example, in US naval rifles 3 in (76 mm) or larger. The effective length of the barrel (from breech to muzzle) is divided by the barrel diameter to give a dimensionless quantity. For example, the main guns of the Iowa-class battleships can be referred to as 16"/50 caliber. They are 16 inches in diameter and the barrel is 800 inches long (16 × 50 = 800). This is also sometimes indicated using the prefix L/; so for example, the most common gun for the Panzer V tank is described as a "75 mm L/70," meaning a barrel with an internal bore of 75 mm (3.0 in), and 5,250 mm (17 ft 3 in) long.

The bore to barrel length ratio is called "caliber" in naval gunnery, but is called "length" in army artillery. Before World War II, the US Navy used 5"/51 caliber (5" L/51) as surface-to-surface guns and 5"/25 caliber (5" L/25) as surface to air guns. By the end of World War II, the dual purpose 5-inch/38-caliber gun (5" L/38) was standard naval armament against surface and air targets. All three had a bore diameter of 5 inches (not 5.51, 5.25, or 5.38 as often misread).

Naval rifles, although constructed and manufactured in roughly the same manner as land-based artillery, were built to much more stringent and studious standards than land-based weapons, and for good reason. At sea, a weapon had to perform, without fail. There was no ready replacement, nor one that could be readily supplied. Over time, the terms of pound (weight of shell) and bore (the actual bore of the weapon) became confused and blurred. Eventually, when the technology existed, the bore (in inches or millimetres) came to be the standard measure.

For naval rifles, the initial change was to actual bore, thus facilitating the manufacture of standard projectiles. They then began to measure the effective length (and therefore range) of the weapon in calibers. These are a measure of the standardized length of the barrel versus the rifled bore of the barrel. In other words, a 12/45 is 12"×45= the length of the rifled bore of that gun in inches. This explains the differences in both penetration and long range performance of various naval rifles over the years.

In addition to the possible improvements in overall performance (i.e. muzzle velocity and striking force), the increase in barrel length also allowed, in some circumstances, an increase in projectile size as well. For example, the American 14/45, as introduced in the New York-class battleships, fired a 1,250 lb (570 kg) projectile. Later improvements to the design, lengthening the rifle itself and also altering the breech, allowed a 1,400 lb (640 kg) projectile and, overall, a greater barrel life. Again we see this pattern with the US 16" guns. The initial design was 45 calibers in length and fired a 2,200 lb (1,000 kg) shell. The later re-design to 50 calibre not only allowed a higher velocity, but also a heavier 2,700 lb (1,200 kg) shell, which ultimately came to be accepted as the greatest US naval shell deployed in combat.

Early gun barrels were short and thick, typically no more than 26 calibers, as the gunpowder propellant they used burned very quickly and violently, and hence its acceleration time was short. Slower-burning "brown powder" formulations of gunpowder allowed gun barrel length to increase slightly in the 1880s, but enormous quantities of brown powder were required. New slower-burning "smokeless powder" propellants available from the mid-1880s onwards, such as Poudre B, cordite and nitrocellulose allowed a gentler prolonged acceleration, hence gun barrels were made progressively longer and thinner. The new formulations were far more powerful propellants than gunpowder and far less was needed by weight as they transformed almost entirely to gases when burned. Muzzle velocity became limited only by the length of barrel that was feasible, both in terms of the construction methods of the day and in terms of any practical constraints imposed by the gun's manner of use.

The practical effect of long barrels for modern guns is that the projectile spends more time in the barrel before it exits, and hence more time is available for expanding gas from the controlled burning of the propellant charge to smoothly accelerate the projectile, bringing about a higher velocity without placing undue strain on the gun. In internal ballistics terms, if the base of a projectile is thought of as a piston propelled by the expanding gas, then as barrel length increases the volume swept by the piston also increases, and hence the amount of energy that can be extracted from the gas's burning increases. A longer barrel allows more propellant to be used: the propellant is all burned fairly early in the projectile's journey along the barrel, except in the very common instance where combustion is still occurring as the projectile leaves the muzzle and a visible muzzle "flash" is produced.

The projectile continues to accelerate as long as the pressure behind it is sufficient to overcome bore friction. The excess energy will continue to accelerate the projectile until it exits the muzzle. If the pressure behind the projectile drops sufficiently before the projectile exits the bore, the projectile can and will slow while still within the barrel, despite residual bore pressure behind the projectile. A light charge with insufficient pressure to expel the projectile will result in a "squib", or projectile lodged in the bore. This pressure is reduced by the increasing barrel volume the gas has to fill.

In order to achieve maximum muzzle velocity with the shortest barrel length, the projectile should exit the barrel as the gas pressure reduces to a small fraction of the maximum, although unlike maximum chamber pressure, the small fraction desired is impossible to measure. In modern guns, increased muzzle velocities can be produced by altering powder composition and/or using duplex charges containing two different powders in order to extend the "pressure curve" further down the bore. By exposing the projectile base to a given pressure for a longer length of time, velocity can be increased without elevating the pressure level generated.

Technological improvements had made it possible to introduce into use long gun barrels that are strong enough to withstand the forces involved in accelerating the shell to a high velocity, while remaining light enough to be reasonably mobile, rigid enough to maintain accuracy, and having a bore able to withstand many firings before needing refurbishment. In World War I 45-caliber naval gun barrels were typical, in World War II 50- to 55-caliber barrels were common, with Germany already manufacturing tank guns of 70 calibers by 1943.

Today, 60- to 70-caliber barrels are not uncommon, but the latest technology has allowed shorter barrels of 55 calibers to attain muzzle velocities of 1,750 m/s (5,700 ft/s), as with the Rheinmetall 120 mm tank gun. However, by using discarding sabots, many such guns fire projectiles which are much smaller than the gun bore, so the relationship of projectile size to barrel length is not as straightforward as with older ordnance.

== Rifled barrels ==
Rifled barrels introduce ambiguity to measurement of caliber. A rifled bore consists of alternating grooves and lands. The distance across the bore from groove to groove is greater than the distance from land to land. Projectiles fired from rifled barrels must be of the full groove-to-groove diameter to be effectively rotated by the rifling, but the caliber has sometimes been specified as the land-to-land diameter before rifling grooves were cut. The depth of rifling grooves (and the consequent ambiguity) increases in larger calibers.

Steel artillery projectiles may have a forward bourrelet section machined to a diameter slightly smaller than the original land-to-land dimension of the barrel and a copper driving band somewhat larger than the groove-to-groove diameter to effectively seal the bore as it becomes enlarged by erosion during prolonged firing.

United States Navy guns typically used rifling depth between one-half and one percent of caliber. Projectile bourrelet diameter specification was 0.015 inches (0.38 mm) less than land-to-land diameter with a minus manufacturing tolerance, so average clearance was about 0.012 inches (0.30 mm). Driving band diameter was groove-to-groove diameter plus 0.02 inches (0.51 mm).
