= Wadding =

Material used in guns to seal gas behind a projectile

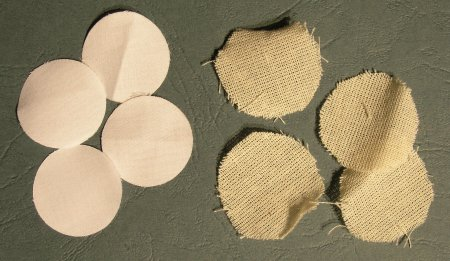
Modern waddings of leather and jute

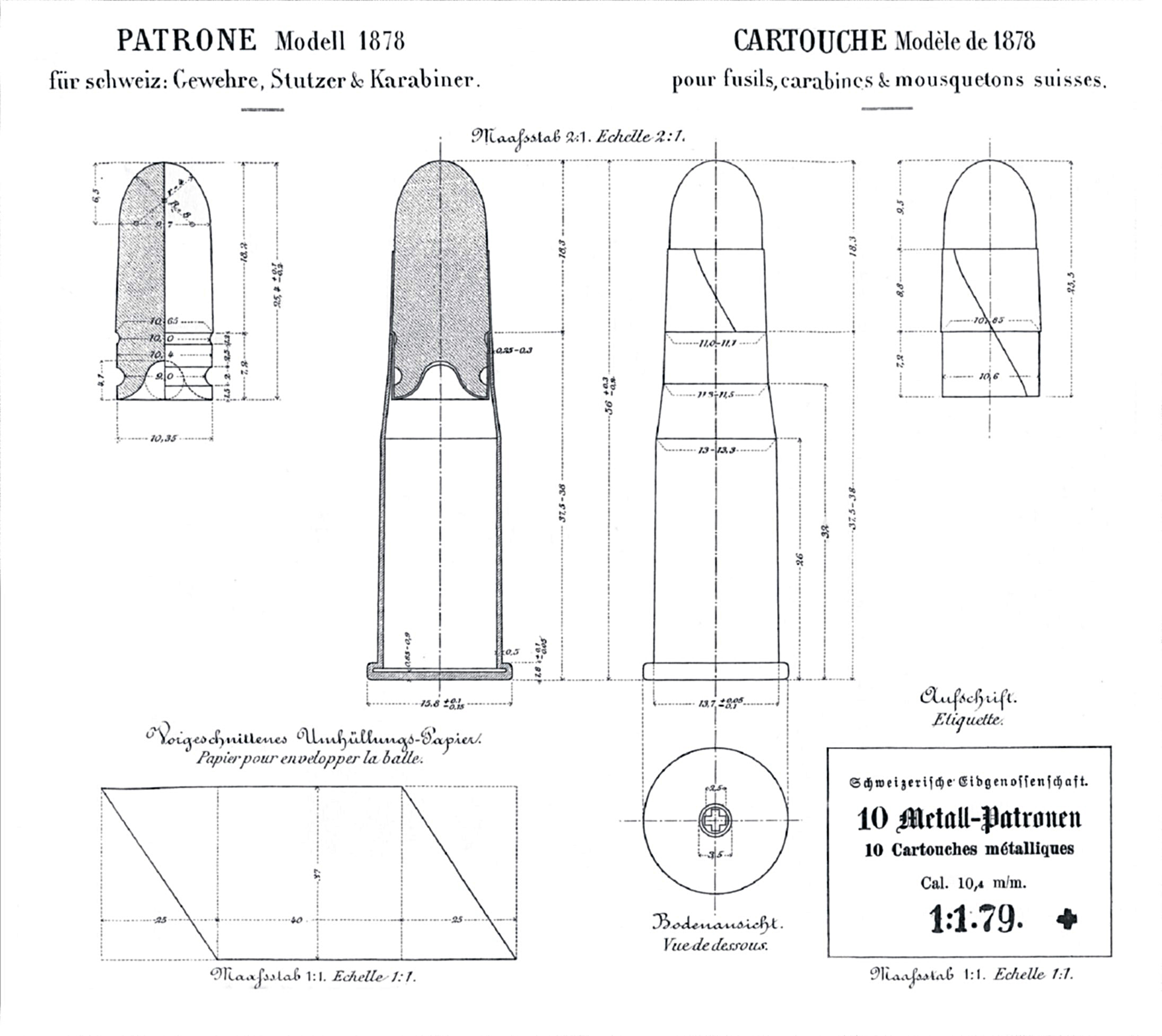
Wadding schematic used on the .41 Swiss intermediate cartridge

Wadding is a disc of material used in guns to seal gas behind a projectile (a bullet or ball), or to separate the propellant from loosely packed shots. Wadding can be crucial to a gun's efficiency, since any gas that leaks past a projectile as it is being fired is wasted. A harder or more carefully designed item which serves this purpose is often called a sabot. Wadding for muzzleloaders is typically a small piece of cloth, or paper wrapping from the cartridge.

== Shotguns ==
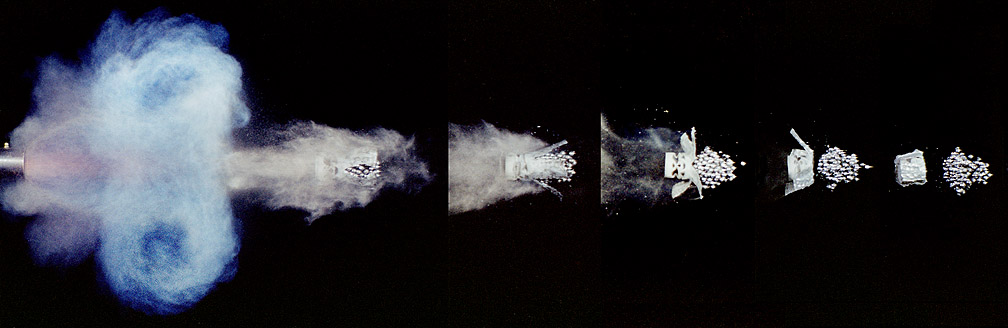
A series of individual 1/1,000,000-second exposures showing shotgun firing shots and wadding separation

In shotgun shells, the wadding is actually a semi-flexible cup-shaped sabot designed to hold numerous much smaller-diameter sub-projectiles (i.e. shots), and is launched out together as one payload-carrying projectile. This minimizes chaotic collisions of the shots with the bore wall and with each other, allowing the internal ballistics to be more consistent. After leaving the muzzle, the wadding loosens and opens up in flight, allowing the much denser shots to be inertially released and scattered. The same function is served when shooting slugs.

== Model rockets ==
Wadding is used in model rockets to protect the parachute when it ejects. Without the recovery wadding, the parachute would melt because the ejection is by a small solid-fuel engine, which gets so hot that it melts the glue almost immediately.

== Effects ==
Burning wadding may have ignited the fire that led to the explosion that destroyed the Orient at the Battle of the Nile (q.v.). The father of Robert Morris, "Financier of the American Revolution," died as the result of being wounded by flying wadding from a ship's gun that was fired in his honor.

== See also ==
- Glossary of firearms terms
- Cannelure
- Driving band
- Sabot (firearms)
