= JHW =

JHW may refer to:

- Chautauqua County/Jamestown Airport, New York, United States (by IATA and FAA LID airport code)
- Jhalawar Road railway station, Rajasthan, India (by Indian Railways station code)
