= Beit Ummar =

Beit Ummar بيت أُمَّر (Arabic)
- Municipality type B

Arabic transcription(s)
  - Arabic: بيت اُمّر
  - Latin: Bayt Ummar (official); Beit Omar (unofficial)
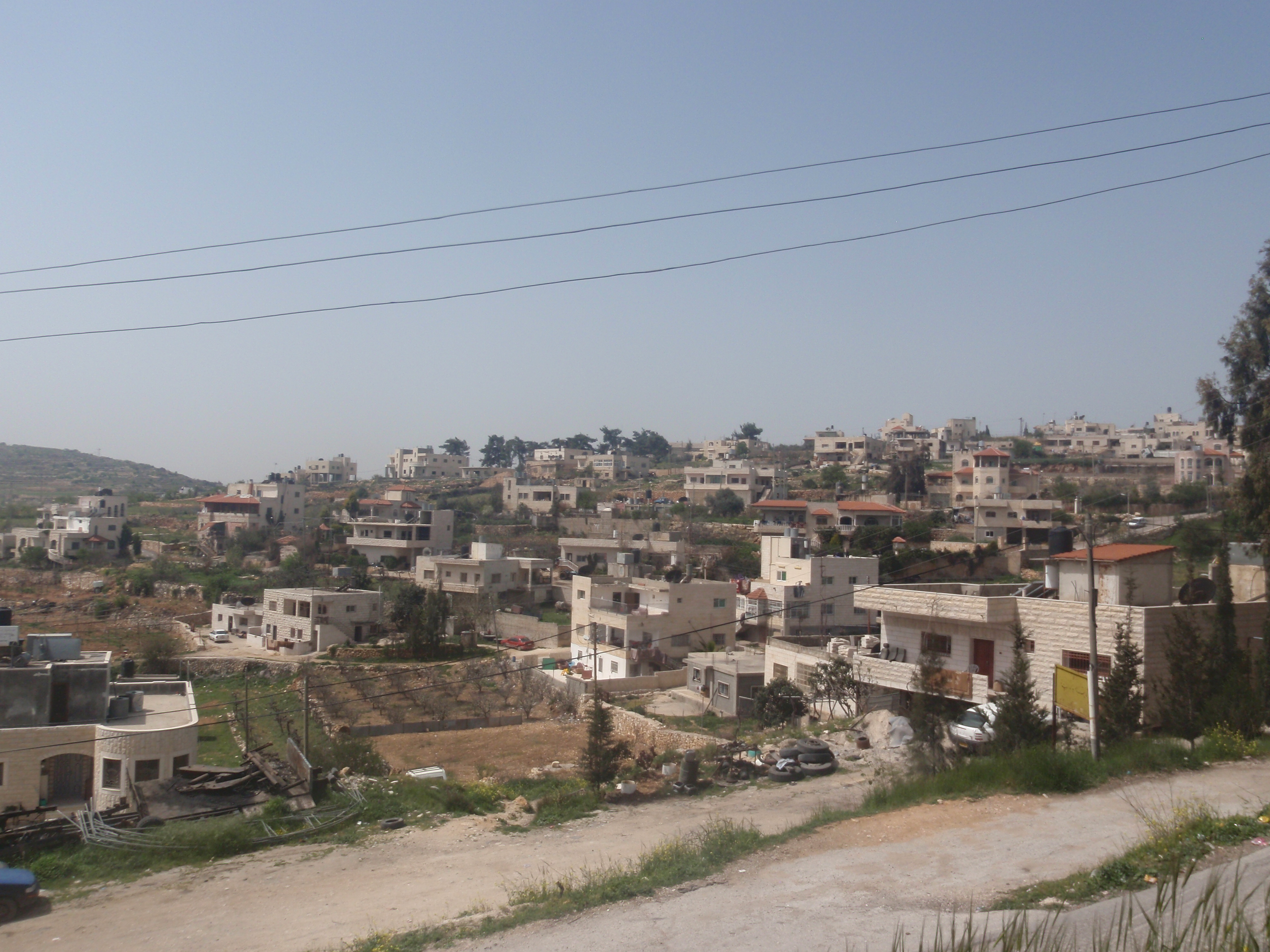
- Beit Ummar, in 2011

- Location of Beit Ummar within Palestinian Authority
- Coordinates: 31°37′17″N 35°06′08″E
- Palestine grid: 159/114
- State: State of Palestine
- Governorate: Hebron

Government
  - Type: Municipality (from 1997)
  - Head of Municipality: Nasri Sabarna

Population (2017)
  - Total: 16,977
- Name meaning: "House of Ummar"

Beit Ummar (Arabic: بيت اُمّر) is a Palestinian town located eleven kilometers northwest of Hebron in the Hebron Governorate of the State of Palestine. According to the Palestinian Central Bureau of Statistics, in 2017, the town had a population of 16,977 inhabitants. Over 4,800 residents of the town are under the age of 18. Since the Second Intifada, unemployment ranges between 60 and 80 percent due mostly to the inability of residents to work in Israel and a depression in the Palestinian economy. A part of the city straddles Road 60 and due to this, several propositions of house demolition have occurred.

Beit Ummar is mostly agricultural and is noted for its many grape vines. This has a major aspect on their culinary tradition of stuffed grape leaves known as waraq al-'inib and a grape syrup called dibs. Beit Ummar also has cherry, plum, apple and olive orchards.

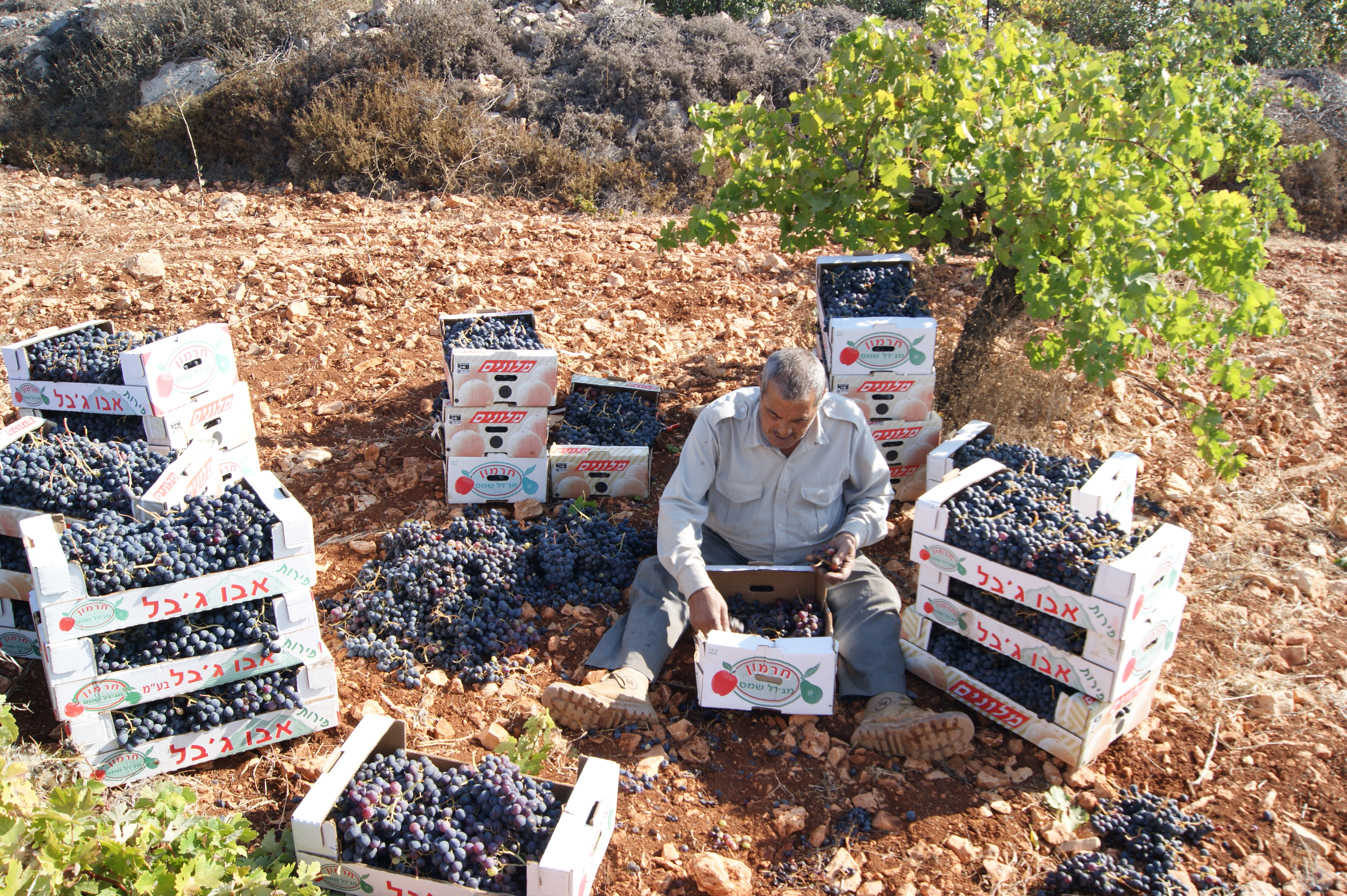
Beit Ommar farmers harvesting grapes, september 2011

== History ==
=== Antiquity ===
Beit Ummar is believed to be the site of Biblical village of Maarath. Another early name is Beit 'Amra. Locals say they trace their origins back to the era of Abraham. Ben-Zvi raises the possibility that remnants of an ancient Jewish population may exist in the village.

A church, tentatively dating to the 5th century CE, (but with changes probably done in the 8th century) was excavated in the 1930s at Khirbat Asida, to the east of the centre of Beit Ummar.

=== Middle ages ===
According to some traditions, the town was named after the Islamic Caliph Umar ibn al-Khattab because he supposedly frequented the town. Many of the town's predominantly Muslim residents are descendants of Arab Christian families who converted during the 7th century Muslim conquest. Christian ruins in the old city are a testament to this conversion over 1,000 years ago.

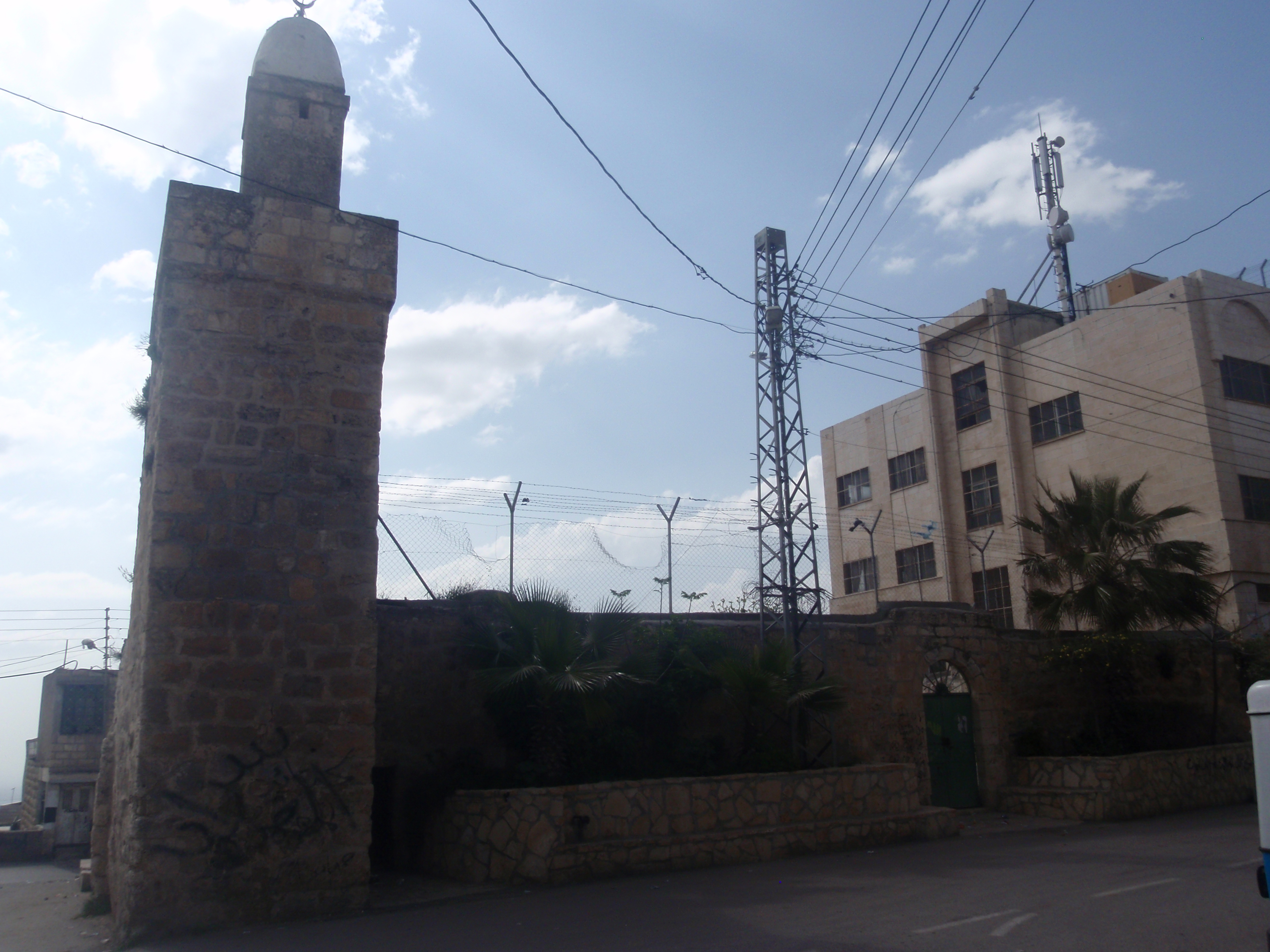
The Mosque of Nabi Matta, 2011

The main mosque in Beit Ummar houses the tomb of Nabi Matta. Matta refers to Amittai, the father of Jonah. Mujir ad-Din writes that Matta was "a holy man from the people of the house of the prophecy." Nearby Halhul houses the purported tomb of Jonah with the inscription reading "Yunus ibn Matta" or "Jonah son of Amittai", confirming that Matta is indeed the Arabic name for Amittai (some suggested it referred to the apostle Matthew); the Beit Ummar tomb is dedicated to Amittai.

In 1226, the Ayyubid sultan al-Mu'azzam built a mosque with a minaret under the supervision of Jerusalem governor Rashid ad-Din al-Mu'azzami. The Mamluks constructed some additions to the mosque and engraved several inscriptions on its surface.

=== Ottoman period ===
While Beit Ummar was mentioned in lists from the early part of the 16th century, there is no evidence of settlement in the second half of the 16th century. However, it was resettled at a later period. In the latter part of the 16th century, its residents were moved to Kuffin, tasked with defending the road. Beit Ummar is also known as "Kuffin al-Fauqa" ("Upper Kuffin").

In 1838, Edward Robinson noted the village from Al-Dawayima.

Victor Guérin visited the village in 1863, and found it to have about 450 inhabitants. Swiss orientalist Albert Socin, noting an official Ottoman village list circa 1870, wrote that Beit Ummar had a total of 44 houses and a population of 133, though the population count included only men. Hartmann found that Bet Ummar had 60 houses.

In 1883, the PEF's Survey of Western Palestine (SWP) described Beit Ummar as a "small but conspicuous village standing on the watershed, and visible from some distance on the north. An ancient road passes through it. Half a mile north-east is a good spring, ‘Ain Kufin. The mosque has a small tower to it. The surrounding neighbourhood is covered with brushwood."

=== British Mandate ===
In the 1922 census of Palestine, conducted by the British Mandate authorities, Bait Ummar had a population of 829 inhabitants, all Muslims, increasing in the 1931 census to 1,135, still entirely Muslim, in 217 inhabited houses.

In the 1945 statistics the population of Beit Ummar was 80 Jews and 1,600 Muslims, and the total land area was 30,129 dunams of land, according to the official land and population survey. 2,912 dunams were plantations and irrigable land, 12,879 were for cereals, while 55 dunams were built-up (urban) land.

=== Jordanian rule ===
In the wake of the 1948 Arab–Israeli War, and after the 1949 Armistice Agreements, Beit Ummar came under Jordanian rule. It was annexed by Jordan in 1950.

In 1961, the population of Beit Ummar was 2,103.

=== Post-1967 ===
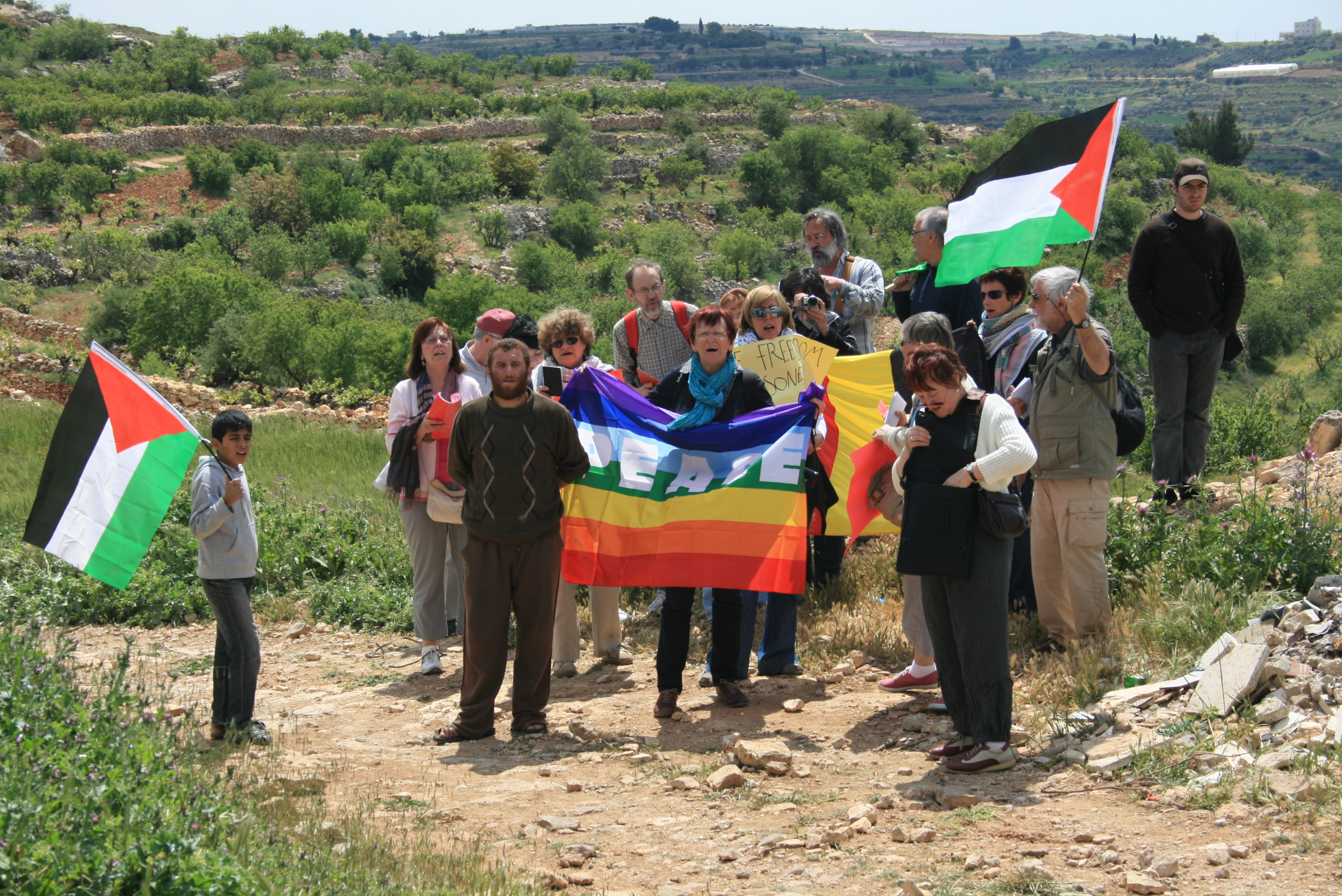
Demonstration against land expropriation, Beit Ummar, December 2011

Since the Six-Day War in 1967, Beit Ummar has been under Israeli occupation. The population in the 1967 census conducted by the Israeli authorities was 2,630.

Beit Ummar became a municipality on April 17, 1997, after the dismantlement of the Israeli village council and Hussein Badr was appointed by the Palestinian National Authority. The current mayor is Nasri Sabarna. The town is currently located in Area B (civil affairs administered by the PNA) and Area C (civil and military affairs controlled by Israel). Israel has confiscated or expropriated approximately 4,000 dunams of village land in order to construct Israeli bypass roads and several Israeli settlements: Karmei Zur, Migdal Oz, Kfar Etzion and Efrat.

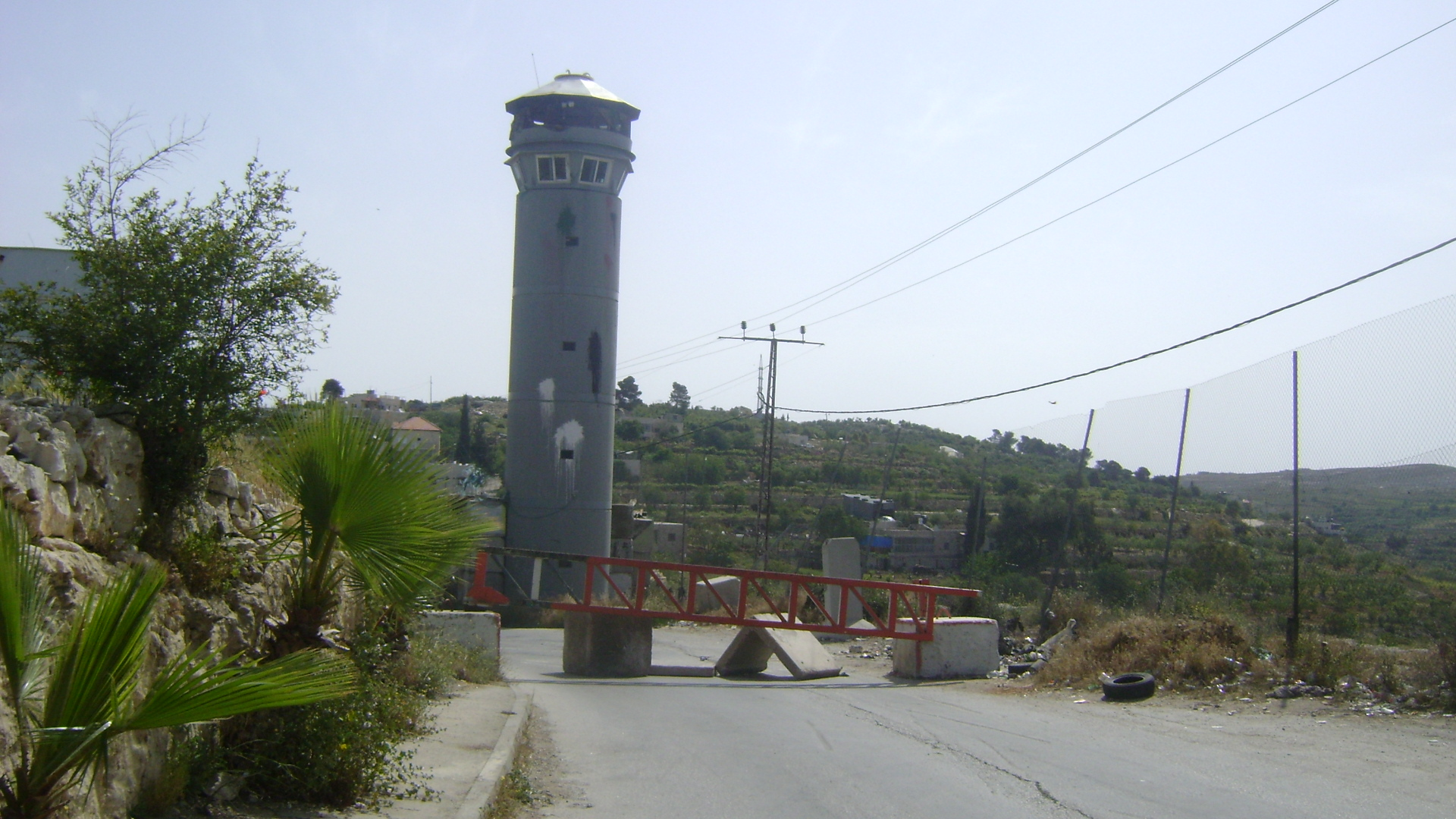
Israeli roadblock and watchtower on a road leading to Beit Ommar, April 2010.

The town is governed by a municipal council consisting of thirteen members including the mayor.

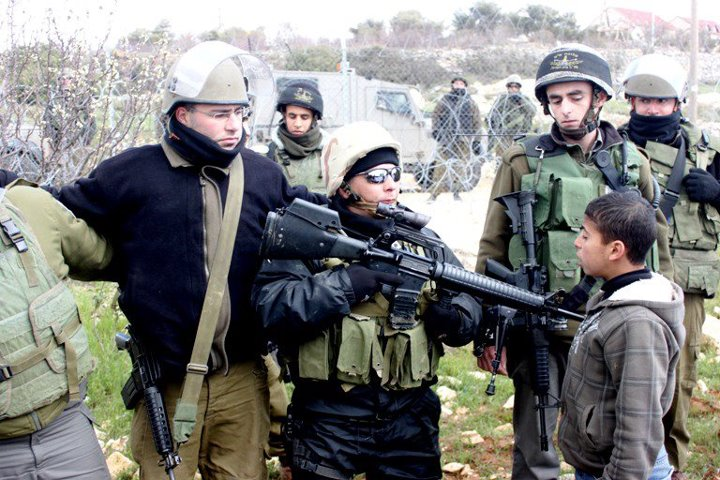
Israeli soldiers at Palestinian weekly demonstration in Beit Ommar, the 17 March 2012

Several people in the village have been shot and killed by Israeli soldiers or settlers during Israeli occupation.

- In January 2011, 17-year-old Yousef Ikhlayl was shot and killed during an altercation with Israeli settlers from Bat Ayin.
- In August 2014, 3 Palestinians were killed on the same day by an IDF sharpshooter during a local protest: Abdul Hamid Bregeith, a 32-year-old father of three, Sultan Zaqiq, 29, a father of two, and Hashem Abu Maria, aged 45. Abu Maria worked for Defence for Children International.
- In April 2015, Ziyad Awad, aged 27, was shot and killed in a demonstration which started after the funeral of his cousin.
- In July 2015, Falah Abu Maria, aged 52, was shot and killed by Israeli forces.
- In July 2021, Mohammed al-Alami, aged 12, was shot and killed by an Israeli soldier while he was riding in a car with his father and sister. Shawqat 'Awad, aged 22, was shot and killed during al-Alami's funeral.

== Jala ==
The nearby site of Jala , which belongs to Beit Ummar, was recorded as a village in 1525/6 and 1538/9 but not afterwards. Today it has a Bedouin population. In 1975, it had 228 residents.

== Notable people ==
- Ali Abu Awwad

== Bibliography ==
- Armstrong, George (1889). Names and Places in the Old and New Testament and Apocrypha. Committee of the Palestine Exploration Fund.
- Baramki, D.C.; Avi-Yonah, M. (1934). "An early Christian Church at Khirbat 'Asida". Quarterly of the Department of Antiquities in Palestine. 3: 17–19.
- Barron, J.B., ed. (1923). Palestine: Report and General Abstracts of the Census of 1922. Government of Palestine.
- Clermont-Ganneau, C.S. (1899). [ARP] Archaeological Researches in Palestine 1873-1874, translated from the French by J. McFarlane. Vol. 1. London: Palestine Exploration Fund.
- Conder, C.R.; Kitchener, H.H. (1883). The Survey of Western Palestine: Memoirs of the Topography, Orography, Hydrography, and Archaeology. Vol. 3. London: Committee of the Palestine Exploration Fund.
- Government of Jordan, Department of Statistics (1964). First Census of Population and Housing. Volume I: Final Tables; General Characteristics of the Population (PDF).
- Government of Palestine, Department of Statistics (1945). Village Statistics, April, 1945.
- Guérin, V. (1869). Description Géographique Historique et Archéologique de la Palestine. Vol 1; Judee, pt. 3.
- Hadawi, S. (1970). Village Statistics of 1945: A Classification of Land and Area ownership in Palestine. Palestine Liberation Organization Research Centre.
- Hartmann, M. (1883). "Die Ortschaftenliste des Liwa Jerusalem in dem türkischen Staatskalender für Syrien auf das Jahr 1288 der Flucht (1871)". Zeitschrift des Deutschen Palästina-Vereins. 6: 102–149.
- Hütteroth, Wolf-Dieter; Abdulfattah, Kamal (1977). Historical Geography of Palestine, Transjordan and Southern Syria in the Late 16th Century. Erlanger Geographische Arbeiten, Sonderband 5. Erlangen, Germany: Vorstand der Fränkischen Geographischen Gesellschaft. ISBN 978-3-920405-41-4.
- Mills, E., ed. (1932). Census of Palestine 1931. Population of Villages, Towns and Administrative Areas. Jerusalem: Government of Palestine.
- Palmer, E.H. (1881). The Survey of Western Palestine: Arabic and English Name Lists Collected During the Survey by Lieutenants Conder and Kitchener, R. E. Transliterated and Explained by E.H. Palmer. Committee of the Palestine Exploration Fund.
- Robinson, E.; Smith, E. (1841). Biblical Researches in Palestine, Mount Sinai and Arabia Petraea: A Journal of Travels in the year 1838. Vol. 2. Boston: Crocker & Brewster.
- Sharon, M. (1999). Corpus Inscriptionum Arabicarum Palaestinae, B-C. Vol. II. BRILL. ISBN 978-9004110830.
- Socin, A. (1879). "Alphabetisches Verzeichniss von Ortschaften des Paschalik Jerusalem". Zeitschrift des Deutschen Palästina-Vereins. 2: 135–163.
