= Gas check =

Gasket-type component of firearms ammunition

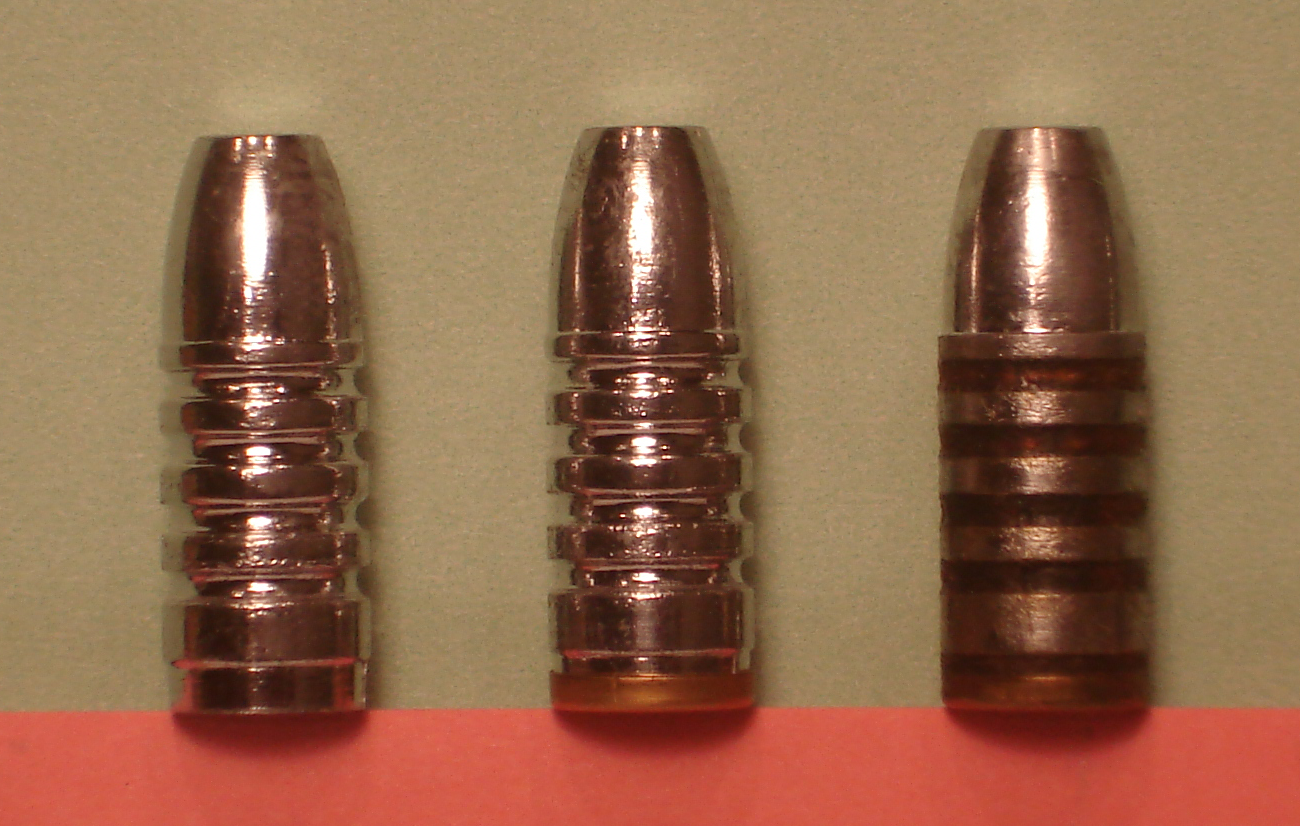
Cast bullets as cast (left), with gas check (center) and lubricated (right).

A gas check is a gasket type component of firearms ammunition. Gas checks are used when non-jacketed bullets are used in high pressure cartridges. The use of a gas check inhibits the buildup of lead in the barrel and improves accuracy.

== Construction ==
Gas checks are most commonly found in the form of a thin cup or disc made of a ductile metal. Copper, zinc, aluminum, and alloys such as brass have been used. A bullet designed to accept a gas check has a rebated base shank which permits attachment of the check without altering the maximum diameter of the bullet. The shallow cup-shaped check is mechanically attached to the reduced shank of the bullet by swaging.

== Purpose ==
High pressures, such as those commonly encountered in maximum loadings of magnum revolver cartridges or rifle cartridges, often result in significant problems when coupled with cast or swaged lead bullets. It was long thought that the high temperatures melted the base of the bullet, but this is no longer thought to be the case. Instead, the high pressures allow propellant gas to escape past the bullet, causing gas cutting, which increases lead deposits in the barrel and unbalances the bullet. A gas check provides a thin layer of harder but still malleable metal on the base of the bullet that obturates to provide a seal and prevents the propellant gas leakage that causes gas cutting, and helps the bullet grip the rifling.

While most commercial cartridges operating at high pressure use jacketed bullets, gas checked bullets are popular with "handloaders" who can recycle lead to make cast bullets, and then must only pay for the gas check. Custom lead bullets, such as those for obsolete calibers, wildcat cartridges, or for special purposes, are easily made with inexpensive casting or swaging equipment. In contrast, manufacturing jacketed bullets requires far more expensive equipment to draw the jackets and swage in the core, so is generally limited to commercial projectile producers. As a result, although it is possible for hobbyists to manufacture jacketed bullets, many of them take the easier option and use gas checked bullets instead.

== Cartridges commonly using gas checks ==
The most common use of gas checks are found in .44 Magnum, .357 Magnum, and 10mm Auto which were developed from non-magnum cartridges by firearm enthusiasts such as Elmer Keith. By loading the large capacity cases designed for black powder with large charges of smokeless powder, velocities well in excess of 1000 ft/s (300 m/s) were produced from handguns for the first time. At these velocities and pressures traditional soft lead bullets would quickly foul the barrel with lead deposits, so gas checked bullets were used in these experimental cartridges.

The other common use of gas checked bullets is in obsolete military rifles. Many of these rifles used calibers that were unique to the rifle; low levels of commercial production and dwindling supplies of surplus ammunition quickly result in high ammunition prices. Many of these rifles use unusual bore diameters; for example, both the British 7.7×56mmR and Soviet 7.62×54mmR rifle cartridges use bore diameters larger than US .30 caliber (7.62 mm) standard bullets, resulting in a much smaller supply of suitable bullets—often just a single full metal jacket bullet design in the weight used by the military loading. Custom made bullets also allow the bullet to be carefully sized to match the bore, which can vary considerably in surplus rifles, and provide both more accuracy and more flexibility. Gas checks allow these bullets to be pushed to higher velocities without undue fouling of the barrel and attendant problems.

== On firearm components ==
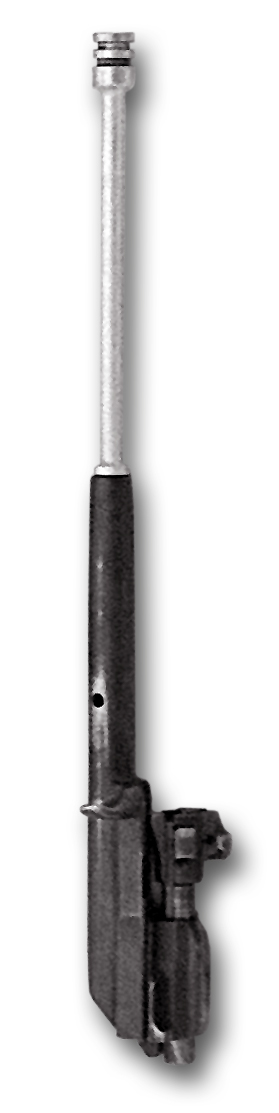
An AK bolt carrier/gas piston. Note the gas rings on the piston.

Gas checks are used on firearm components in contact with gas pressures such as pistons on gas-operated firearms.

An unusual example is the Benelli CB M2 submachine gun is unusual that it uses a ramrod sealed with gas rings instead of a bolt to chamber the 9x25mm AUPO caseless rounds. It uses an open-bolt type operation that operates in conjunction with a side mounted firing pin/hammer outside the chamber at the rear of the barrel to strike the primer of the rounds.

== See also ==
- Glossary of firearms terms
- Cannelure
- Driving band
- Piston ring
- Sabot
