= Piston ring =

Part of a reciprocating engine

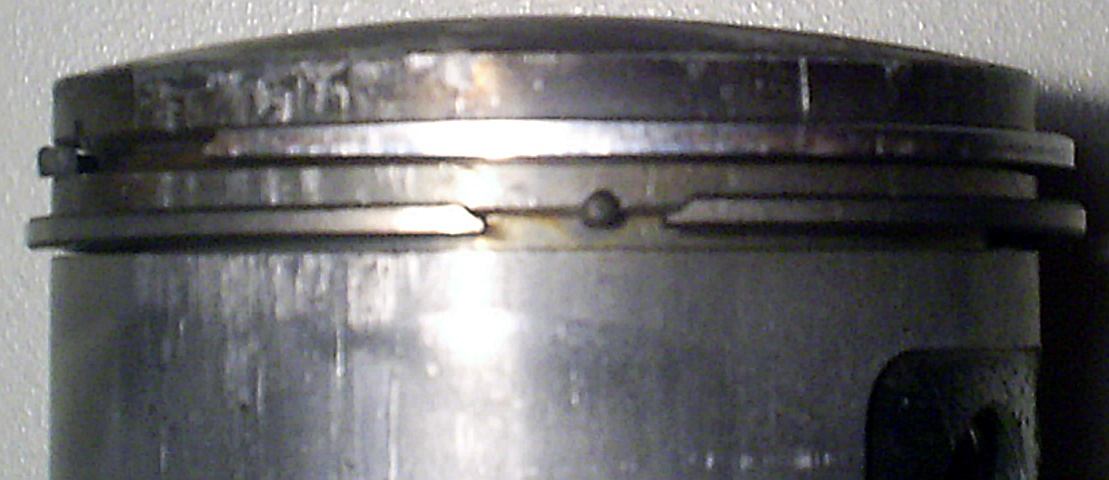
Two piston rings mounted on a two-stroke engine piston. The ring gap for the bottom ring is visible in the centre of the image.

A piston ring is a metallic split ring that is attached to the outside of a piston in an internal combustion engine or steam engine.

The main functions of piston rings in engines are:

1. Sealing the combustion chamber so that there is minimal loss of gases to the crank case.
2. Improving heat transfer from the piston to the cylinder wall.
3. Maintaining the proper quantity of the oil between the piston and the cylinder wall
4. Regulating engine oil consumption by scraping oil from the cylinder walls back to the sump.

Most piston rings are made from cast iron or steel.

== Design ==
Piston ring configurations: A) Rectangular section B) Barrel face C) keystone D) Torsional twist E) Taper face F) Dykes Which also differ for the type of retainer band: Y) Behind-band X) Above or under-band Or for the ends that work without firm stops: K) Step J) Oblique W) Oblique with step

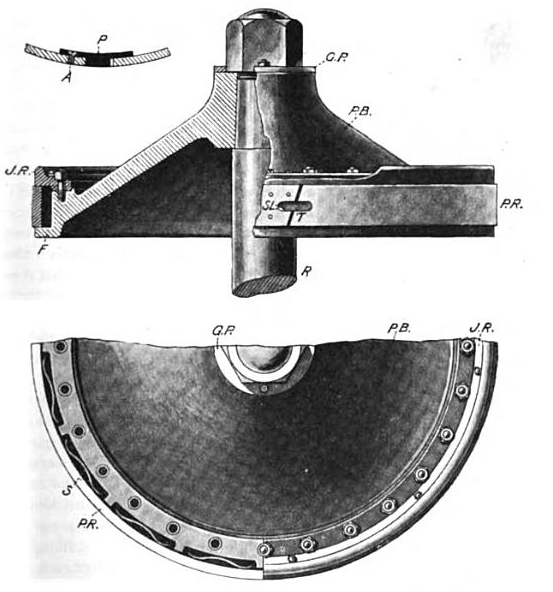
Piston ring. The piston ring (PR) is a split band pressed against the wall of the cylinder by springs (S) mounted in the inner "junk ring" (JR). The tongue (T) maintains the seal as the ring expands and splits apart.

Piston rings are designed to seal the gap between the piston and the cylinder wall. If this gap were too small, thermal expansion of the piston could mean the piston seizes in the cylinder, causing serious damage to the engine. On the other hand, a large gap would cause insufficient sealing of the piston rings against the cylinder walls, resulting in excessive blow-by (combustion gases entering the crankcase) and less pressure on the piston, reducing the power output of the engine.

The sliding motion of the piston ring inside the cylinder wall causes friction losses for the engine. The friction caused by piston rings is approximately 24% of the total mechanical friction losses for the engine. The design of the piston rings is therefore a compromise between minimising friction while achieving good sealing and an acceptable lifespan.

Lubrication of piston rings is difficult and has been a driving force to improvements in the quality of motor oil. The oil must survive high temperatures and harsh conditions with a high-speed sliding contact. Lubrication is particularly difficult as the rings have an oscillating motion rather than continuous rotation (such as in a bearing journal). At the limits of piston movement, the ring stops and reverses direction. This disrupts the normal oil wedge effect of a hydrodynamic bearing, reducing the effectiveness of the lubrication.

Rings are also sprung to increase the contact force and to maintain a close seal. The spring force is provided by either the stiffness of the ring itself or by a separate spring behind the seal ring.

It is important that rings float freely in their grooves within the piston, so that they can stay in contact with the cylinder. Rings binding in the piston, usually due to a build-up of either combustion products or a breakdown of the lubricating oil, can cause engine failure and is a common cause of failure for diesel engines.

=== Number of rings ===
Sealing is often achieved by multiple rings, each with their own function, using a metal-on-metal sliding contact. Most pistons have at least two piston rings per cylinder.

Automotive piston engines typically have three rings per cylinder. The top two rings—known as compression rings—are primarily for sealing the combustion chamber. The bottom ring—known as the oil control ring—is primarily for controlling the supply of oil to the cylinder wall, in order to lubricate the piston skirt and the oil control rings.

=== Ring construction ===
The compression rings in an automotive engine typically have a rectangular or keystone shaped cross-section. The upper compression ring typically has a barrel profile for the periphery, while the lower compression ring typically has a taper napier facing. Some engines also use a taper facing for the top ring, and simple plain-faced rings were used in the past.

Oil control rings are typically made from either a single piece of cast iron, multiple pieces of steel, or steel/iron with a helical spring backing to create the tension required for a close seal. Cast iron oil rings and rings with a helical spring backing have two scraping lands of various detailed form. On the other hand, multi-piece steel oil control rings usually consist of two thin steel rings (called rails) with a spacer-expander spring between them to keep the two rails apart and provide radial pressure.

The gap in the piston ring compresses to a few thousandths of an inch when inside the cylinder bore. Ring gap shapes include square cut, angle cut, tite joint, step cut, hook step and mitre step.

Historically there was also a design that used a split ring, like a key ring. It was designed so that there was no gap in the ring but it could exert spring pressure on the cylinder wall. These were called Clupet rings.

== History ==
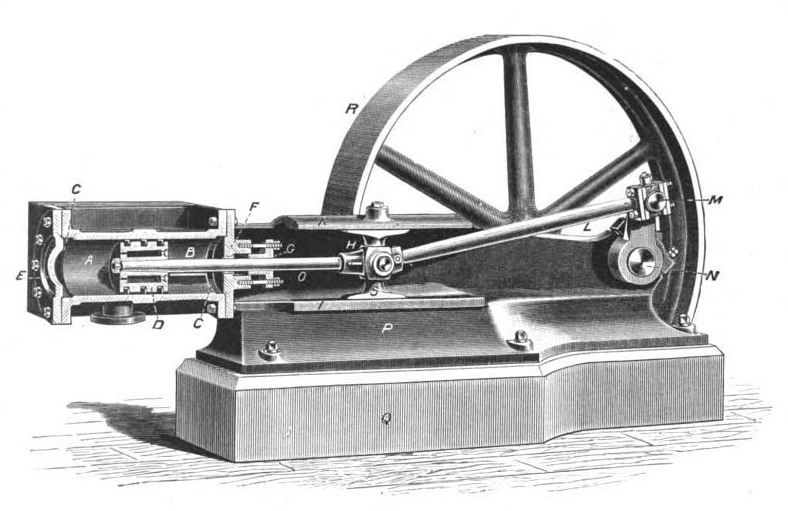
Steam engine with 3 piston rings at location D

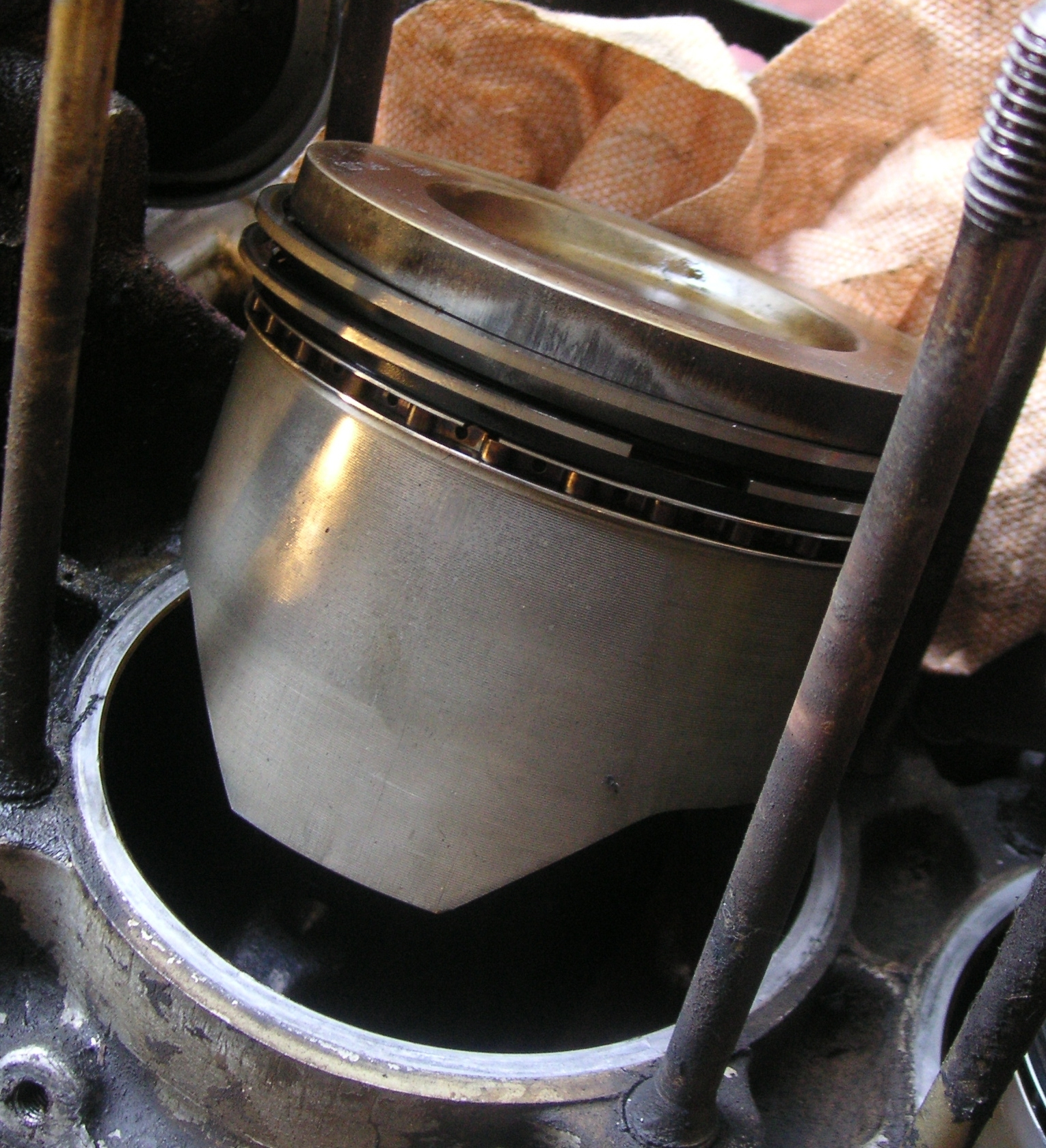
Spring-loaded piston rings

Early steam engines used a hemp packing to seal the combustion chamber, which caused high frictional resistance and did not provide a very effective seal.

The first use of a piston ring in the cylinders of a steam engine appears in 1825 by Neil Snodgrass, a Glasgow engineer and mill-owner, for use in his own machines. This used springs to keep the seal steam-tight. From use within the mill this was experimented on the steamer "Caledonia" which plied the Gareloch.

The modern design of a metallic split-ring was invented by John Ramsbottom in the 1850s. Ramsbottom's initial design in 1852 was a circular shape, however these wore unevenly and were not successful. In 1854, a revised design was claimed to have a lifespan of up to 4,000 mi (6,437 km). This was based on the discovery that a perfectly round (prior to installation) ring with a split in it does not exert an even pressure on the cylinder walls once installed. The revised piston ring was manufactured to an out-of-round shape, so that it would exert even pressure once installed in the cylinder. An 1855 patent documented this change. The switch to metallic piston rings dramatically reduced the frictional resistance, the leakage of steam, and the mass of the piston, leading to significant increases in power and efficiency and longer maintenance intervals.

== Engine wear ==
Piston rings are subject to wear as they move up and down the cylinder bore, due to their own inherent load and due to the gas load acting on the ring. To minimize this, they are made of wear-resistant materials, such as cast iron and steel, and are coated or treated to enhance the wear resistance. Coatings used in modern motorcycles include chromium, nitride, or ceramic coating made by plasma deposition or physical vapour deposition (PVD). Most modern diesel engines have top rings coated with a modified chromium coating (known as CKS or GDC), which has aluminium oxide or diamond particles respectively included in the chrome surface.

In two-stroke engines, the port design is also an important factor for the lifespan of the piston rings.

Experimental tribological investigations of piston ring materials have shown that modern high-nitrogen steels used in spark-ignition engine ring–liner systems may exhibit wear behaviour strongly influenced by hydrogen-containing fuels and the chemical composition of lubricating coolants. Under boundary lubrication conditions, hydrogen generated during tribochemical decomposition of lubricants can diffuse into near-surface layers of ring materials, modifying friction mechanisms, wear intensity and the evolution of surface damage. Such effects are associated with changes in contact loading response, debris formation processes and microstructural transformations in the friction zone, highlighting the importance of hydrogen-assisted degradation phenomena in the durability assessment of piston rings operating in modern fuel and lubrication environments.

Recent tribological studies have demonstrated that the wear behaviour of piston rings and cylinder liners is strongly governed by lubrication starvation, surface engineering solutions and contact loading evolution during engine operation. Experimental investigations under starved lubrication conditions revealed that the ring–liner interface may undergo transitions from mild abrasive and oxidative wear to severe scuffing associated with tribo-layer degradation and increased friction coefficient, directly influencing component reliability and service life. To mitigate such degradation processes, modern piston rings increasingly employ advanced hard coatings produced by physical vapour deposition techniques, including chromium-based, nitride and carbon-containing multilayer systems designed to reduce friction losses and improve wear resistance in combustion environments. Reviews of recent coating technologies further emphasize the importance of optimized deposition processes, nanostructured architectures and tailored tribological properties for improving durability, energy efficiency and emission performance of internal combustion engines.

== See also ==
- List of auto parts
- Obturator ring
- Cannelure
- Gas check
