= Wad =

WAD, Wad, or wad may refer to:

== Science and technology ==
- Doom WAD, the default format of package files for the Doom engine. Stands for "Where's All the Data?"
- Wad (mineral), any black manganese oxide or hydroxide mineral rich rock of various ore deposits
- WAD, the IATA airport code for Andriamena Airport, Andriamena, Madagascar
- Wadding, disc of material used in guns
- Wii WAD, a file archive which can be used on a Wii gaming console via homebrew software
- Web Accessibility Directive, EU law that ensures that all public sector organizations are accessible for persons with disabilities.
- "whiplash associated disorder" is a colloquial name in medicine

== Other uses ==
- WAD, defunct Afghan intelligence agency.
- wad, the Dutch term for a mud flat on the Wadden Sea
- Wretched and Divine: The Story of the Wild Ones, a 2013 album by American rock band Black Veil Brides

== See also ==
- Wadh, a town in Balochistan
