= Jalpari =

Jalpari or Jal Pari (lit. 'water fairy' or 'mermaid') may refer to:

- Jal Pari (album), a 2004 album by Atif Aslam
- Jal Pari (TV series), a TV serial aired on Geo TV, Pakistan
- Jalpari (1952 film), a 1952 Indian Hindi-language film featuring Nalini Jaywant
- Jalpari: The Desert Mermaid, a 2012 Indian Hindi-language film

== See also ==
- Jal (disambiguation)
- Pari (disambiguation)
