= Bourrelet =

Portion of an elongated artillery projectile

A bourrelet is a portion of an elongated artillery projectile that is used in conjunction with the projectile's driving band, or rotating band, to stabilize its launch by keeping the fore part of the projectile precisely aligned with the gun barrel.

== Details ==
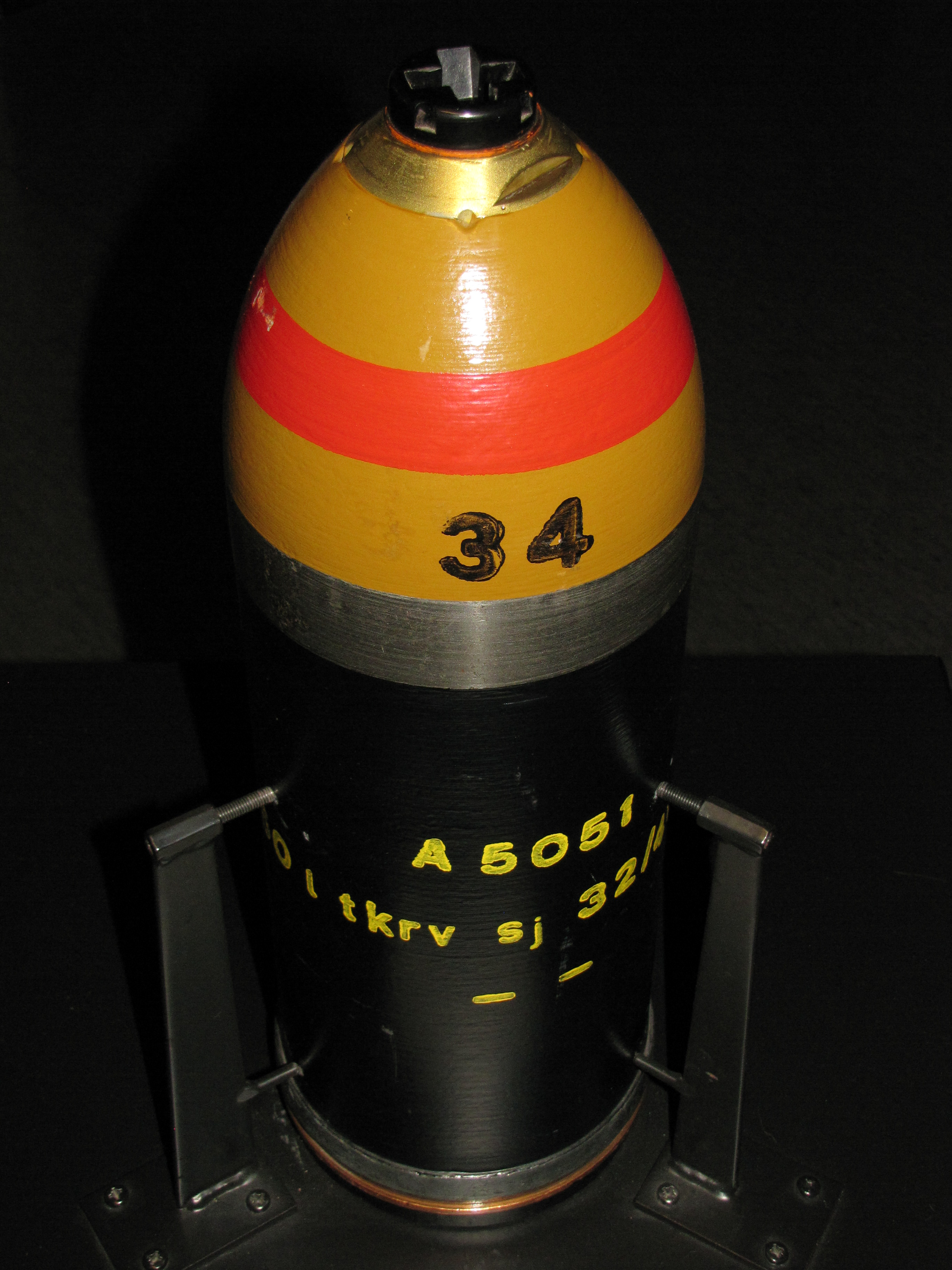
The unpainted bourrelet is between the yellow and black paint while the copper rotating band is near the bottom of the projectile.

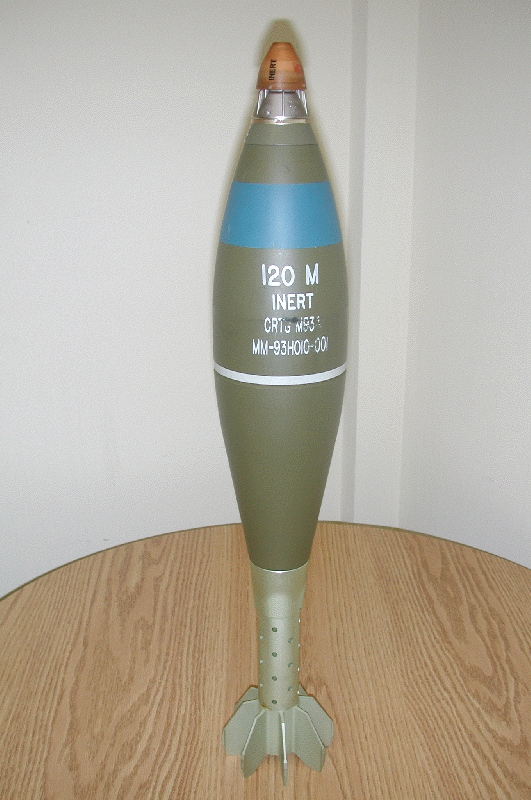
The bourrelet is identified by the white line around the circumference of this mortar projectile. No rotating band is required for use in an unrifled mortar.

The bourrelet is the forward part of the sabot, supporting the front of the projectile.

A not-to-scale diagram showing bourrelet and driving ring of a projectile.

The bourrelet has a diameter very slightly smaller than the interior diameter of the barrel through which that projectile is to be propelled. It is typically precisely machined to a specified diameter after the remainder of the cast projectile body has been roughly machined to a smaller diameter. The bourrelet is normally forward of a rotating band or driving band near the aft end of the projectile. The driving band is customarily made of a softer metal than the remainder of the artillery projectile and of a larger diameter than the bourrelet to seal the barrel and be engraved by the rifling to spin-stabilize the projectile in flight. The bourrelet is not engraved by the rifling, but is supported by the lands between the rifling to align the long axis of the projectile with the axis of the artillery bore.

The bourrelet bearing surface generally has a longitudinal width of about one-sixth caliber machined with a smooth surface to reduce friction wear of the rifling lands. If the bourrelet diameter is not a close fit, the in-bore yaw angle will affect the stability of a projectile during flight. However, excessive pressures may be generated within an artillery barrel attempting to fire a cast steel projectile with a bourrelet diameter lacking clearance to pass irregularities within the artillery barrel. The distance between the bourrelet and the rotating or driving band is typically at least one bore diameter to prevent wobbling, and greater distances reduce perpendicular force required for equivalent alignment. The United States Navy typically specified a bourrelet diameter 0.015 in (0.38 mm) smaller than nominal land diameter with a minus manufacturing tolerance so the average clearance was about 0.012 in (0.30 mm) to compensate for thermal expansion firing a projectile from a warm magazine through a cold barrel and to clear copper fouling from the driving bands of previously fired projectiles. Clearance was greater in barrels heated or eroded by firing numerous projectiles, but no appreciable increase of dispersion was anticipated for clearances less than 0.05 in (1.3 mm).

In the case of a sub-caliber projectile, such as an armor-piercing round, a sabot surrounds the sub-caliber portion, with driving bands at the rear and the bourrelet supporting the front, aligning the armor-piercing portion with the center of the barrel of the gun.
