= Jaal =

Jaal may refer to:

- Jaal (1952 film), a 1952 Indian Hindi-language drama film by Guru Dutt, starring Dev Anand and Geeta Bali
- Jaal (1967 film), a 1967 Indian Hindi-language crime-drama film by Moni Bhattacharjee, starring Biswajeet Chatterjee and Mala Sinha
- Jaal (1973 film), a 1973 Pakistani film
- Jaal (1986 film), a 1986 Indian Hindi-language action thriller film by Umesh Mehra, starring Mithun Chakraborty and Rekha
- Jaal (TV series), a 2019 Pakistani Urdu-language drama television series
- Jaal: The Trap, a 2003 Indian action film by Guddu Dhanoa, starring Sunny Deol and Reema Sen
- Jaal, a 2012 fantasy novel by Indian author Sangeeta Bahadur
- Jaal Ama Darav, a character in the 2017 video game Mass Effect: Andromeda

== See also ==
- Jala (disambiguation)
- Jal (disambiguation)
