= Cannelure =

Groove or channel around ammunition

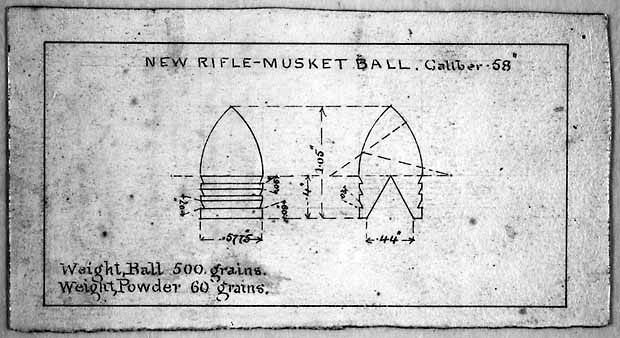
Minie Ball showing three cannelures, Improved Harper's Ferry Bullet 1855

A cannelure is a groove or channel around ammunition, either bullets or cartridge cases. The cannelure may be pressed into or cast with the bullet or case.

== Function ==
In the Minié ball the purpose of the cannelure is to hold a lubricant. Cannelures for this purpose are commonly called "grease grooves" or "lubrication (lube) grooves" or just "grooves" by bullet casters (see the glossary of firearms technical terminology maintained by SAAMI). The lubricant reduces metal fouling by lead that is rubbed off the projectile and onto the bore by friction. It also reduces the rate of bore fouling by black powder residue.

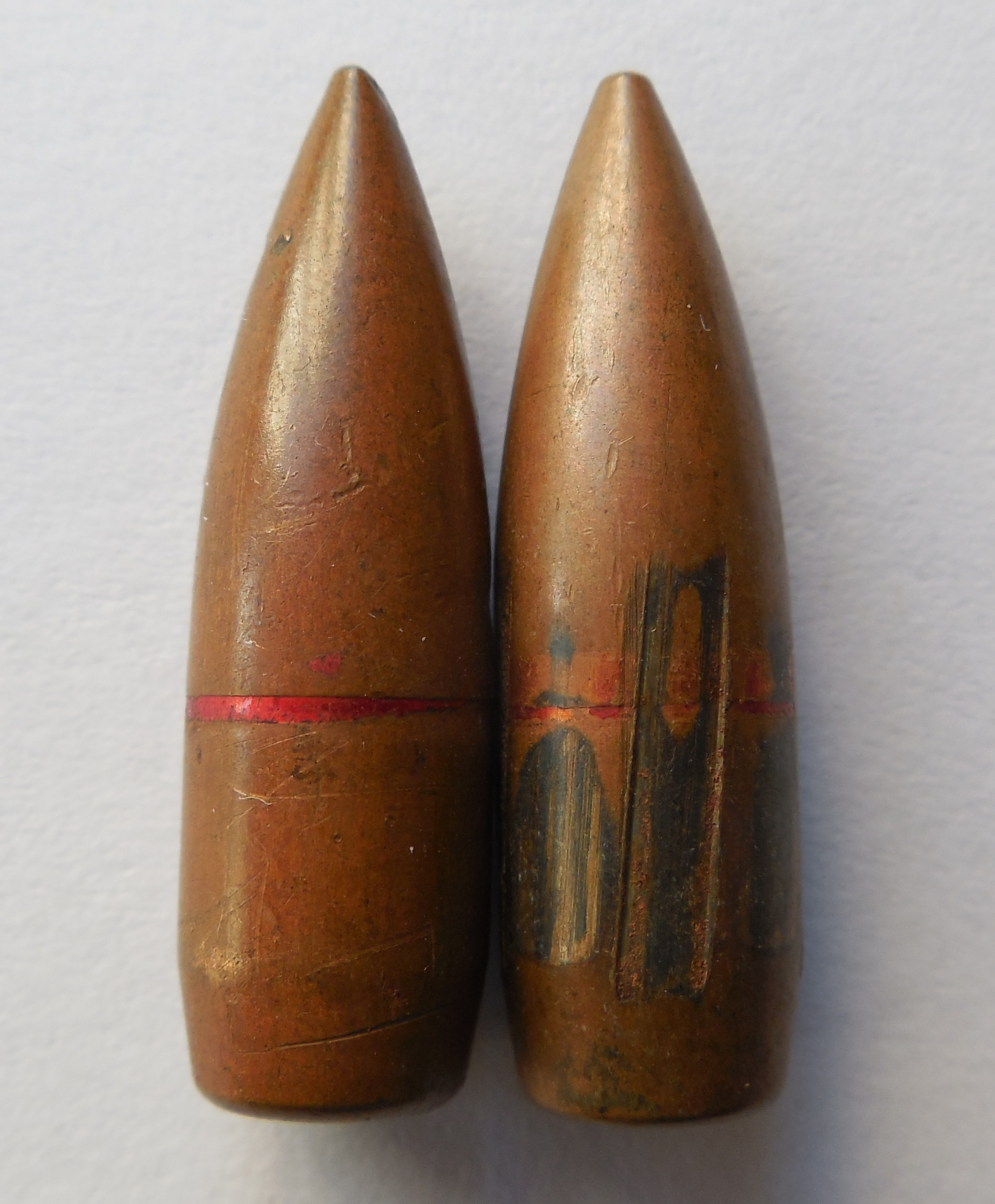
7.62mm bullets fired and unfired showing a red cannelure

In modern bullets, such as the 7.62 illustrated here, the cannelure is pressed into the circumference of the bullet to provide a strong purchase for the mouth of the cartridge case when it is crimped onto that cannelure. This is done to prevent the bullet from moving either forward or backward in the case.

While bullet setback can be a problem with any self-loading gun, it can also be a problem with bolt-action rifles if the cartridges used are rimmed or semi-rimmed and are not positioned in a magazine so that the topmost cartridge can move freely into the chamber, without catching on and moving the cartridge below it. If this happens the lower cartridge may have its bullet damaged and also setback into the cartridge creating a dangerous problem. It is also a concern in guns with tubular magazines, such as lever-action rifles, as the column of cartridges in the magazine compress the feed spring that can bounce during recoil, thereby slapping the cartridges against each other's noses. Dropping a rifle with a tubular magazine can also inflict a damaging inertial pounding on the noses of the cartridges within it.

Revolvers that have heavy recoil (and even some that do not if used with poorly crimped cartridges) can have their bullet move forward out of the case. Once they move far enough, the cylinder movement will be stopped by the protruding bullet.

== Setback ==
Bullet setback describes the condition when the bullet is seated deeper inside the cartridge case than it should be. In cartridges, the cannelure is a band pressed into the case which helps prevent cartridge setback when the case mouth is properly crimped onto the cannelure. Bullet setback of .1" can increase pressure beyond safe limits and possibly cause a catastrophic failure.

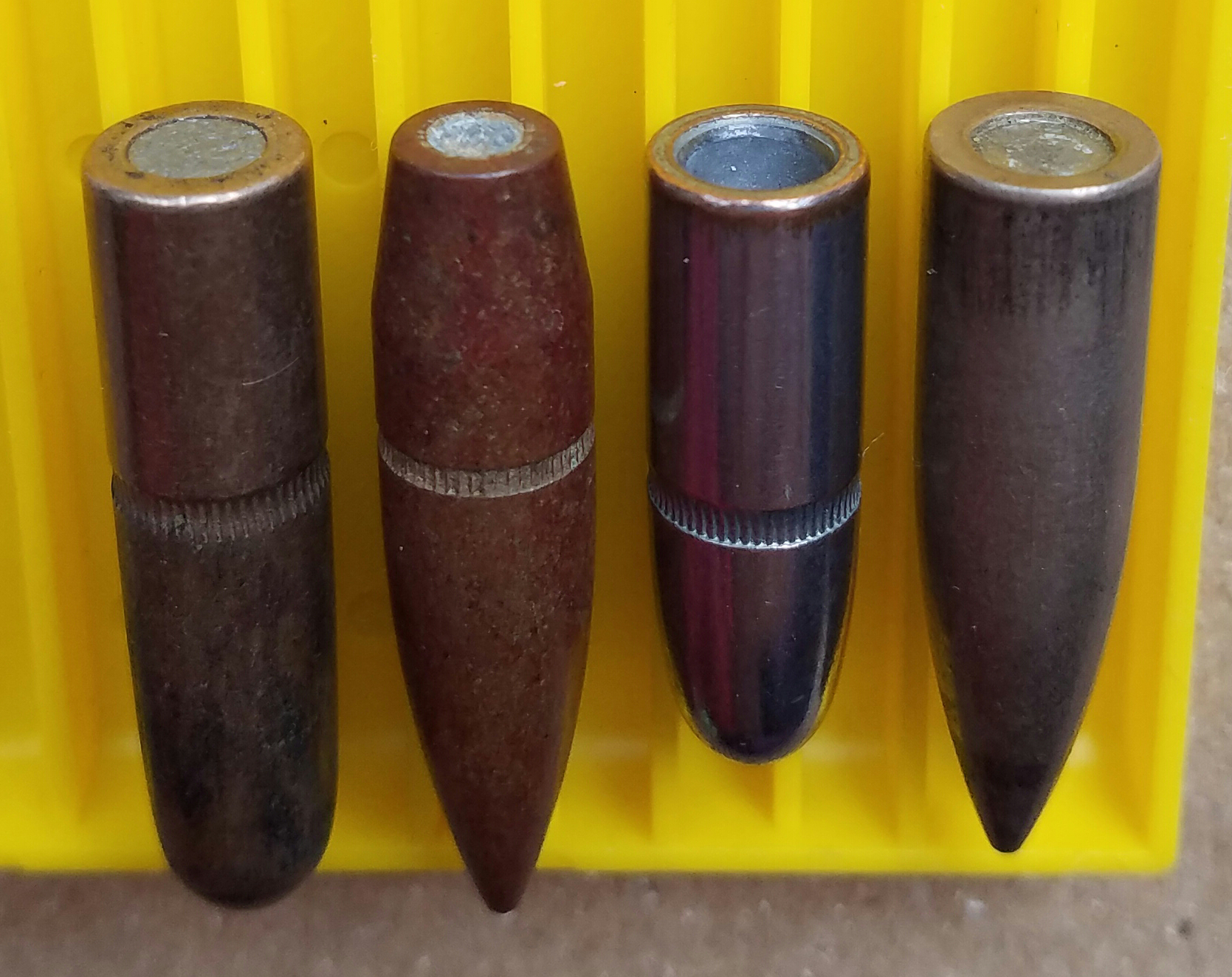
The first 3 of these rifle bullets have cannelures

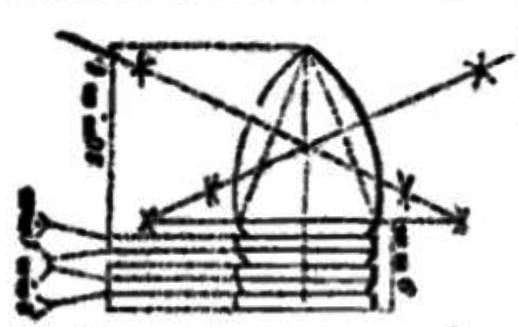
Minie Ball with 3 Cannelures

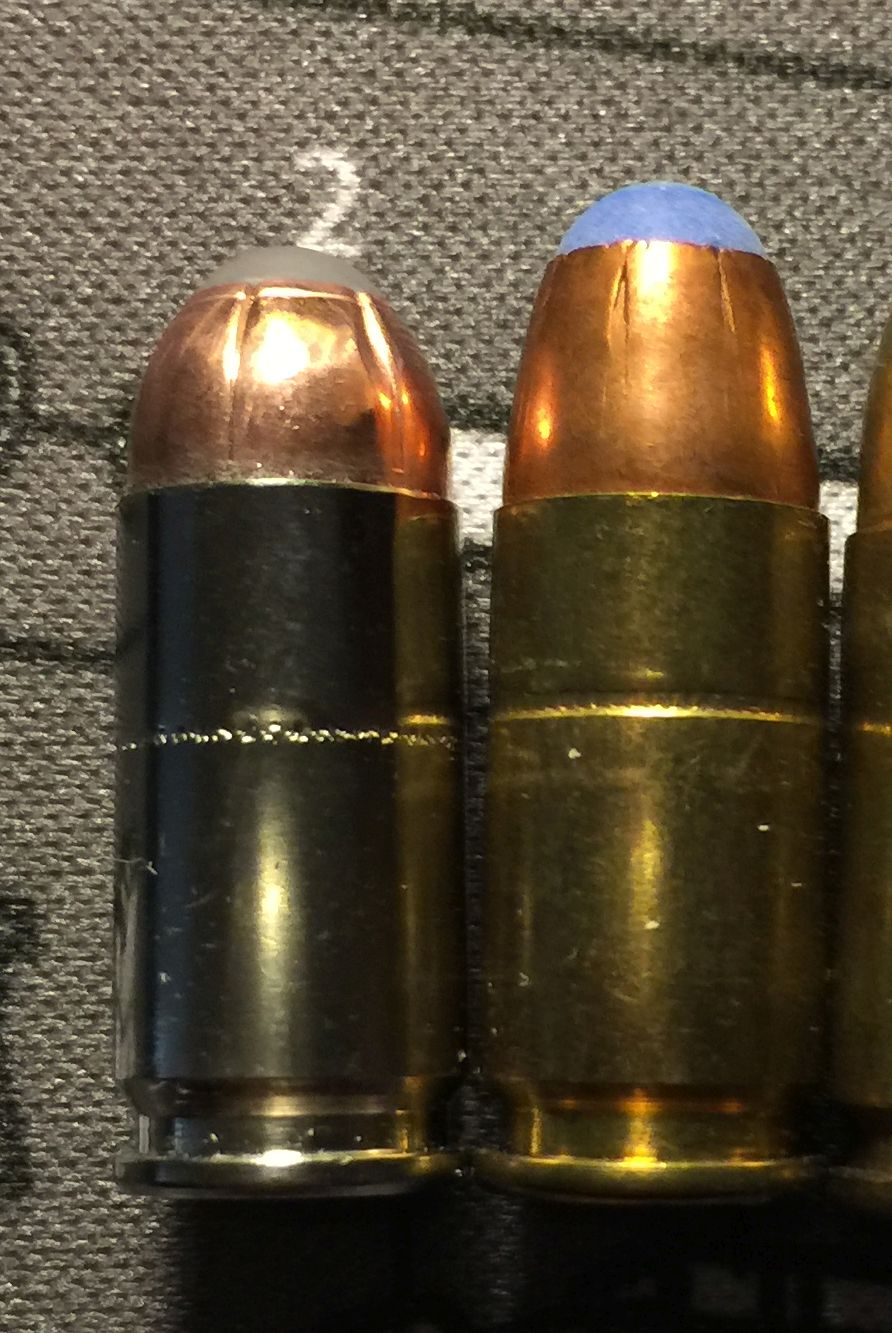
Glaser Powerball with cannelured cases

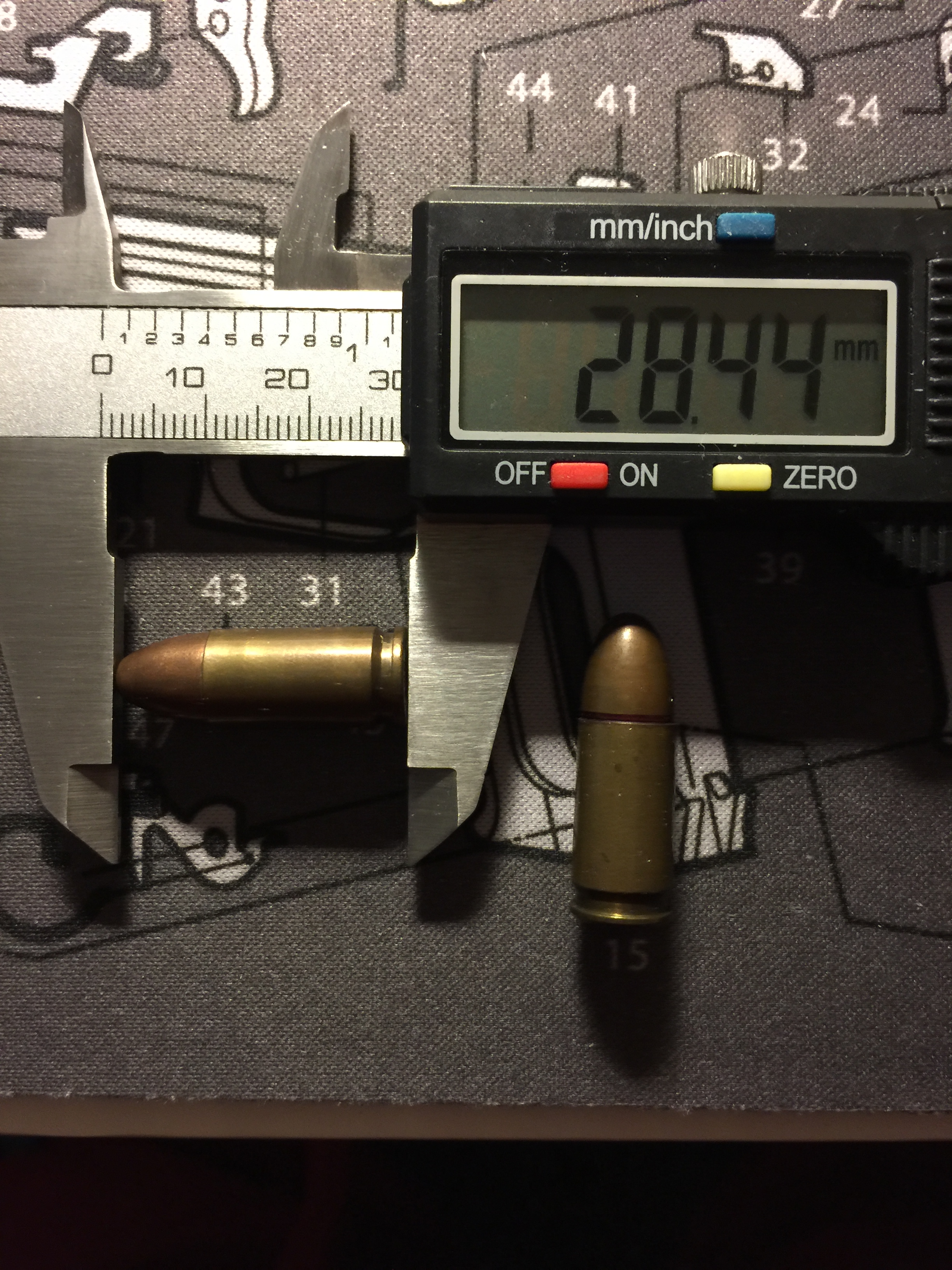
9×19mm Parabellum with bullet setback by 1.2 mm

== See also ==
- Glossary of firearms terms
- Driving band, artillery equivalent to a cannelure
- Gas check
- Piston ring

== External reference ==
- Revolver that exploded, note the position of the bullet
