= Jala, Hebron =

Jala, Hebron Arabic: جالا
- Jala, Hebron
- Location of Jala, Hebron within Palestine
- Country: Palestine
- Governorate: Hebron Governorate
- Elevation: 793 m (2,602 ft)

Population (2007)
  - Total: 249

Jala is a Palestinian village village located in the southern West Bank, approximately 12 kilometers north of the city of Hebron, within the Hebron Governorate.

== Geography ==
Jala is situated at an elevation of approximately 793 meters above sea level. It is affiliated with the Beit Ummar Municipal Council and is located about 2 kilometers south of the town. The village contains several archaeological and historical sites, and grape cultivation is common in the area.

== Population ==
According to the Palestinian Central Bureau of Statistics, the population of Jala was 249 in 2007.

== See also ==
- Hebron Governorate
- Beit Ummar
