= JAL (compiler) =

Programming language and compiler

JAL (Just Another Language) is a Pascal-like programming language and compiler that generates executable code for PIC microcontrollers. It is a free-format language with a compiler that runs on Linux, MS-Windows and MS-DOS (OSX support). It is configurable and extendable through the use of libraries and can even be combined with PIC assembly language.

== History ==
JAL was originally created by Wouter van Ooijen and released as free software under the GNU General Public License in 2003. In 2006, Stef Mientki initiated the development of a new version, JALV2, which was programmed by Kyle York and beta tested by an international user group.

== Sample code ==
-- JAL 2.3
include 16f877_bert--define the variables
var byte resist--define the pins
pin_a0_direction = input--variable resistor
pin_d7_direction = input--switch
pin_c2_direction = output--pwm led--enable pulse width modulation
PWM_init_frequency (true, true)

forever loop--convert analog on a0 to digital
   resist = ADC_read_low_res(0)

   -- run measurement through flash memory
   program_eeprom_write(2000,resist)
   program_eeprom_read(2000,resist)

   -- run measurement through data memory
   data_eeprom_write(10,resist)
   data_eeprom_read(10,resist)

   -- if the switch is pressed return random value
   if pin_d7 == high then
      resist = random_byte
   end if--send resistance to PC
   serial_sw_write(resist)
   delay_100ms(1)
   -- set actual PWM duty cycle
   PWM_Set_DutyCycle (resist, resist)

end loop
