= Sabot (firearms) =

High velocity projectile alignment device

Sabot ammunition

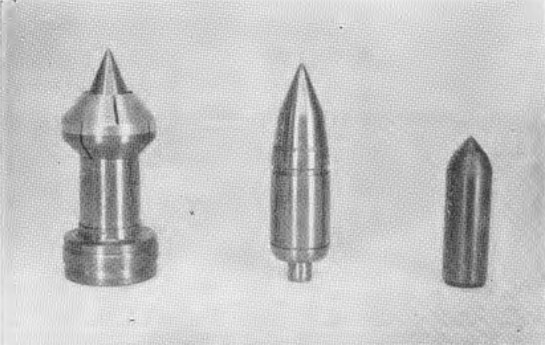
Armour-piercing discarding sabot projectile with sabot (left), without sabot (center), and without jacket (right)

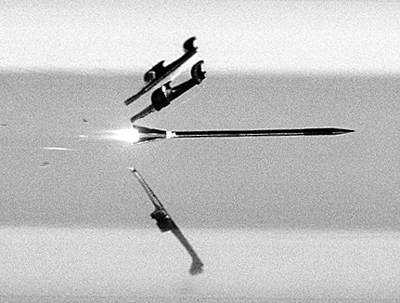
APFSDS long rod penetrator separating from "double-ramp" sabot.

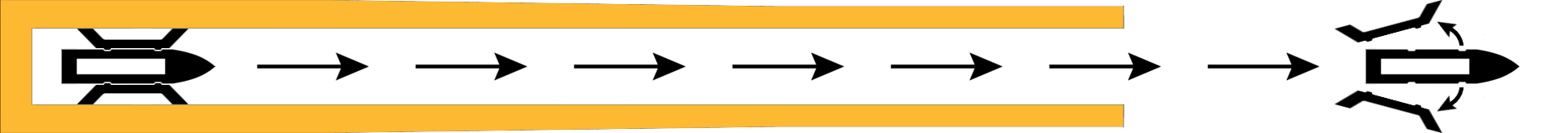
Diagram showing the operation of a discarding "spindle-shaped" sabot on an APDS-projectile

A sabot (UK: /sæˈboʊ, ˈsæboʊ/, US: /ˈseɪboʊ/) is a supportive device used in firearm/artillery ammunitions to fit/patch around a projectile, such as a bullet/slug or a flechette-like projectile (such as a kinetic energy penetrator), and keep it aligned in the center of the barrel when fired. It allows a narrower projectile with high sectional density to be fired through a barrel of much larger bore diameter with maximal accelerative transfer of kinetic energy. After leaving the muzzle, the sabot typically separates from the projectile in flight, diverting only a very small portion of the overall kinetic energy.

The sabot component in projectile design is the relatively thin, tough and deformable seal known as a driving band or obturation ring needed to trap propellant gases behind a projectile, and also keep the projectile centered in the barrel, when the outer shell of the projectile is only slightly smaller in diameter than the caliber of the barrel. Driving bands and obturators are used to seal these full-bore projectiles in the barrel because of manufacturing tolerances; there always exists some gap between the projectile outer diameter and the barrel inner diameter, usually a few thousandths of an inch; enough of a gap for high pressure gasses to slip by during firing. Driving bands and obturator rings are made from material that will deform and seal the barrel as the projectile is forced from the chamber into the barrel.

Sabots use driving bands and obturators, because the same manufacturing tolerance issues exist when sealing the saboted projectile in the barrel, but the sabot itself is a more substantial structural component of the in-bore projectile configuration. Refer to the two armor-piercing fin-stabilized discarding sabot (APFSDS) pictures to see the substantial material nature of a sabot to fill the bore diameter around the sub-caliber arrow-type flight projectile, compared to the very small gap sealed by a driving band or obturator to mitigate what is known classically as windage.

== Design ==
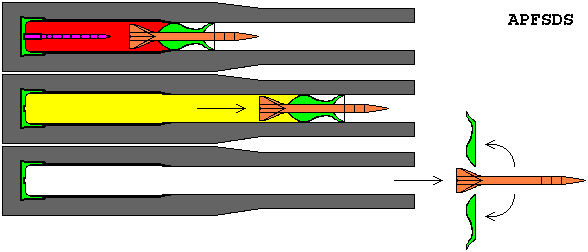
Function of an APFSDS sabot propellant long rod penetrator propellant gases sabot gun barrel

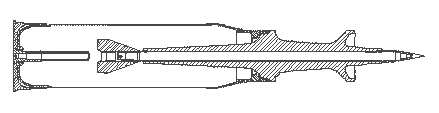
American 120 mm M829A2 APFSDS shell

The function of a sabot is to provide a larger bulkhead structure that fills the entire bore area between an intentionally designed sub-caliber flight projectile and the barrel, giving a larger surface area for propellant gasses to act upon than just the base of the smaller flight projectile. Efficient aerodynamic design of a flight projectile does not always accommodate efficient interior ballistic design to achieve high muzzle velocity. This is especially true for arrow-type projectiles, which are long and thin for low drag efficiency, but too thin to shoot from a gun barrel of equal diameter to achieve high muzzle velocity. The physics of interior ballistics demonstrates why the use of a sabot is advantageous to achieve higher muzzle velocity with an arrow-type projectile. Propellant gasses generate high pressure, and the larger the base area that pressure acts upon the greater the net force on that surface. Force (pressure times area) provides an acceleration to the mass of the projectile. Therefore, for a given pressure and barrel diameter, a lighter projectile can be driven from a barrel to a higher muzzle velocity than a heavier projectile. However, a lighter projectile may not fit in the barrel, because it is too thin. To make up this difference in diameter, a properly designed sabot provides less parasitic mass than if the flight projectile were made full-bore, in particular providing dramatic improvement in muzzle velocity for APDS (Armor-piercing discarding sabot) and APFSDS (Armor-piercing fin-stabilized discarding sabot) ammunition.

Seminal research on two important sabot configurations for long rod penetrators used in APFSDS ammunition, namely the "saddle-back" and "double-ramp" sabot was performed by the US Army Ballistics Research Laboratory during the development and improvement of modern 105mm and 120mm kinetic energy APFSDS penetrators and published in 1978, permitted by the significant advancement in the computerized finite element method in structural mechanics at that time; and now represents the existing fielded technology standard. (See for example the development of the M829 series of anti-tank projectiles beginning with the base model M829 in the early 1980s, to the 2016 M829A4 model, employing ever longer "double-ramp" sabots). Upon muzzle exit, the sabot is discarded, and the smaller flight projectile flies to the target with less drag resistance than a full-bore projectile. In this manner, very high velocity and slender, low drag projectiles can be fired more efficiently, (see external ballistics and terminal ballistics). Nevertheless, the weight of the sabot represents parasitic mass that must also be accelerated to muzzle velocity, but does not contribute to the terminal ballistics of the flight projectile. For this reason, great emphasis is placed on selecting strong yet lightweight structural materials for the sabot, and configuring the sabot geometry to efficiently employ these parasitic materials at minimum weight penalty.

Made of some lightweight material (usually high strength plastic in small caliber rifles, (see SLAP Saboted light armor penetrator), shotguns and muzzle loader ammunition; aluminium, steel, and carbon fiber reinforced plastic for modern anti-tank kinetic energy ammunition; and, in classic times, wood or papier-mâché – in muzzle loading cannons). The sabot usually consists of several longitudinal pieces held in place by the cartridge case, an obturator or driving band. When the projectile is fired, the sabot blocks the gas, provides significant structural support against launch acceleration, and carries the projectile down the barrel. When the sabot reaches the end of the barrel, the shock of hitting still air pulls the parts of the sabot away from the projectile, allowing the projectile to continue in flight. Modern sabots are made from high strength aluminum and graphite fiber reinforced epoxy. They are used primarily to fire long rods of very dense materials, such as tungsten heavy alloy and depleted uranium. (see for example the M829 series of anti-tank projectiles).

Sabot-type shotgun slugs were marketed in the United States from about 1985, and became legal for hunting in most U.S. states. When used with a rifled slug barrel, they are very much more accurate than normal shotgun slugs.

== Types ==
=== Cup sabot ===
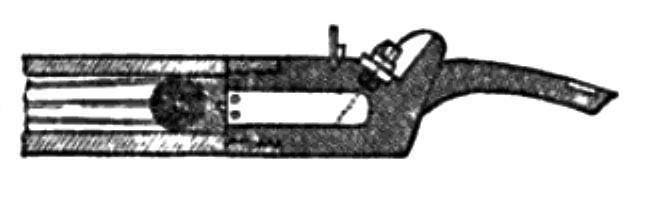
Lead bullet being supported by a wooden cup sabot in a Delvigne gun

A cup sabot supports the base and rear end of a projectile, and the cup material alone can provide both structural support and barrel obturation. When the sabot and projectile exit the muzzle of the gun, air pressure alone on the sabot forces the sabot to release the projectile. Cup sabots are found typically in small arms ammunition, smooth-bore shotgun and smooth-bore muzzleloader projectiles.

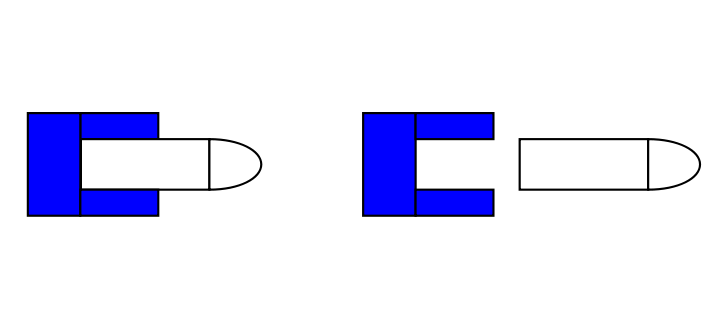
Cup sabot function

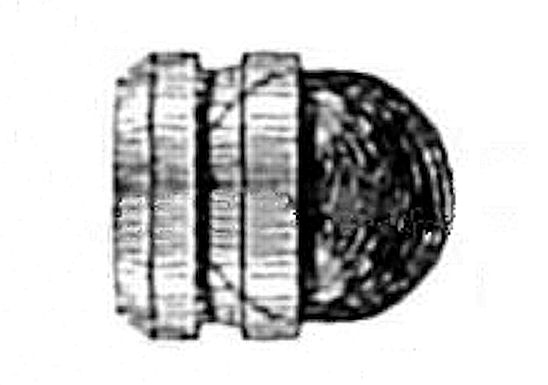
Sabot shell with cup sabot for an 1824 Paixhans gun

=== Expanding cup sabot ===
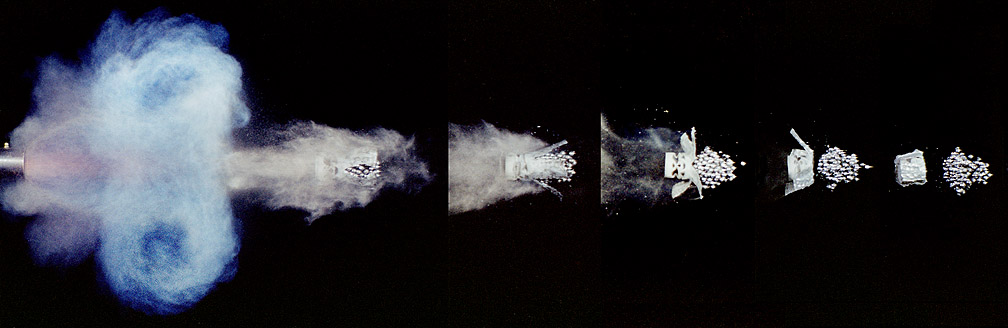
Series of individual 1/1,000,000 second exposures showing shotgun firing shot and expanding cup sabot separation

Used typically in rifled small arms (SLAP, shotguns, and muzzleloaders), an expanding cup sabot has a one piece sabot surrounding the base and sides of a projectile, providing both structural support and obturation. Upon firing, when the sabot and projectile leave the muzzle of the gun, centrifugal force from the rotation of the projectile, due to barrel rifling, opens up the segments surrounding the projectile, rapidly presenting more surface area to air pressure, quickly releasing it.

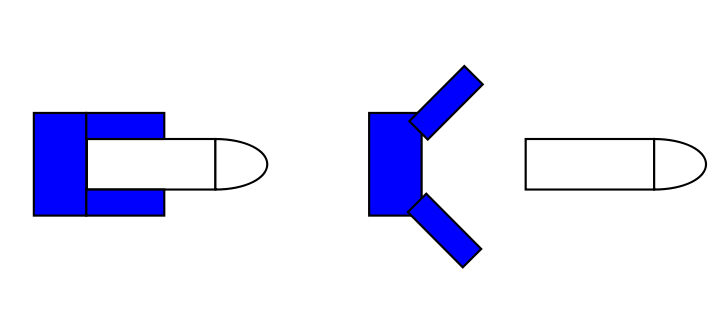
Expanding cup sabot function

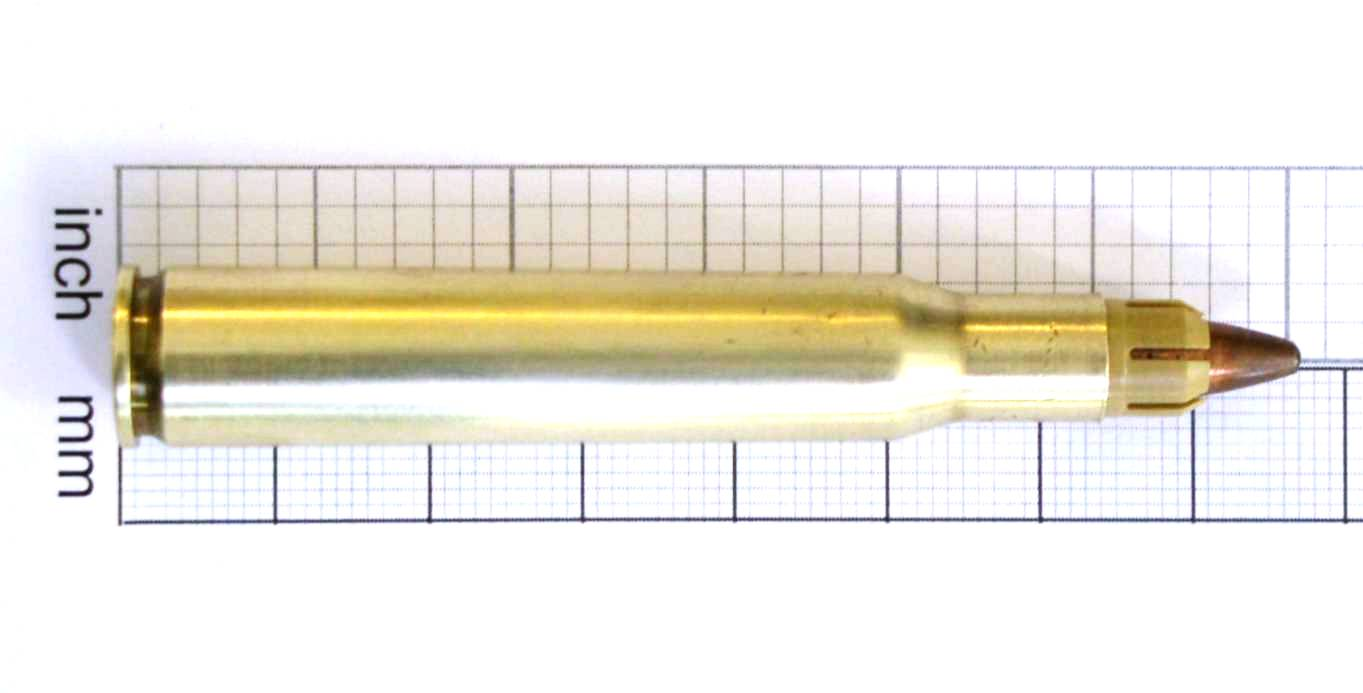
.30-06 cartridge with expanding cup sabot projectile

Although the use of cup sabots of various complexity are popular with rifle ammunition hand-loaders, in order to achieve significantly higher muzzle velocity with a lower drag, smaller diameter and lighter bullet, successful saboted projectile design has to include the resulting bullet stability characteristics. For example, simply inserting a commercially available 5.56mm (.224) bullet into a sabot that will fire it from a commercially available 7.62mm (.300) barrel may result in that 5.56mm bullet failing to achieve sufficient gyroscopic stability to fly accurately without tumbling. To achieve gyroscopic stability of longer bullets in smaller diameter requires faster rifling. Therefore, if a bullet requires at least 1 turn in 7 inch twist, (1:7 rifling), in 5.56mm, it will also require at least 1:7 rifling when saboted in 7.62mm. However, larger caliber commercial rifles generally don't need such fast twist rates; 1:10 being a readily available standard in 7.62mm. As a result, the twist rate of the larger barrel will dictate which smaller bullets can be fired with sufficient stability out of a sabot. In this example, using 1:10 rifling in 7.62mm restricts saboting to 5.56mm bullets that require 1:10 twist or slower, and this requirement will tend to restrict saboting to the shorter (and lighter) 5.56mm bullets.

=== Base sabot ===
A base sabot has a one piece base which supports the bottom of the projectile, and separate pieces that surround the sides of the projectile and center it. The base sabot can have better and cleaner sabot/projectile separation than cup or expanding cup sabots for small arms ammunition, but may be more expensive to manufacture and assemble.

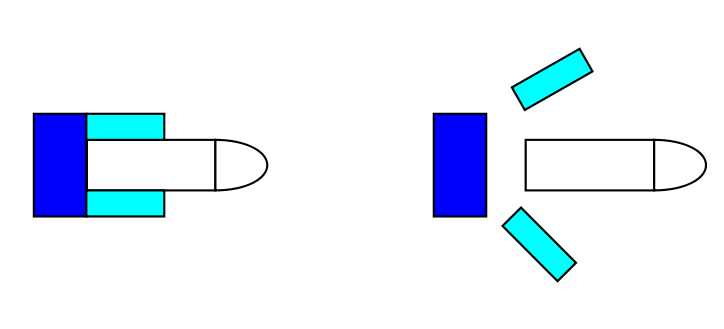
Base sabot function

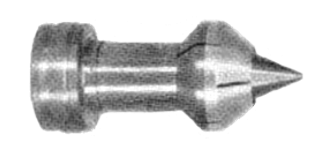
APDS-projectile with base sabot and "support ring" sabot

In larger caliber APDS ammunition, based on the cup, expanding cup, and base sabot concepts, significantly more complex assemblies are required.

=== Spindle sabot ===
A spindle sabot uses a set of at least two and upwards of four matched longitudinal rings or "petals" which have a center section in contact with a long arrow-type projectile; a front section or "bore-rider" which centers that projectile in the barrel and provides an air scoop to assist in sabot separation upon muzzle exit, and a rear section which both centers the projectile, provides a structural "bulkhead", and seals propellant gases with an obturator ring around the outside diameter. Spindle sabots are the standard type used in modern large caliber armor-piercing ammunition. Three-petal spindle-type sabots are shown in the illustrations at the right of this paragraph. The "double-ramp" and "saddle-back" sabots used on modern APFSDS ammunition are a form of spindle sabot.

Shotgun slugs often use a cast plastic sabot similar to the spindle sabot. Shotgun sabots in general extend the full length of the projectile and are designed to be used more effectively in rifled barrels.

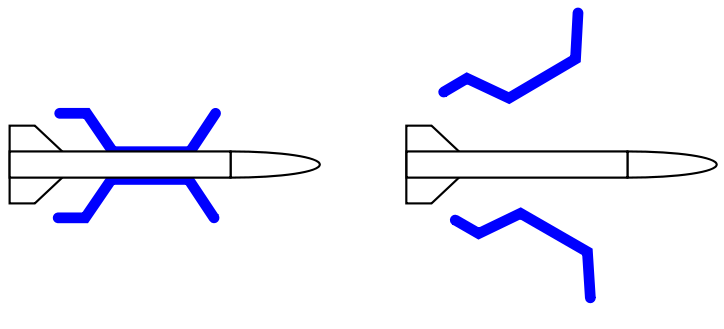
Spindle sabot function

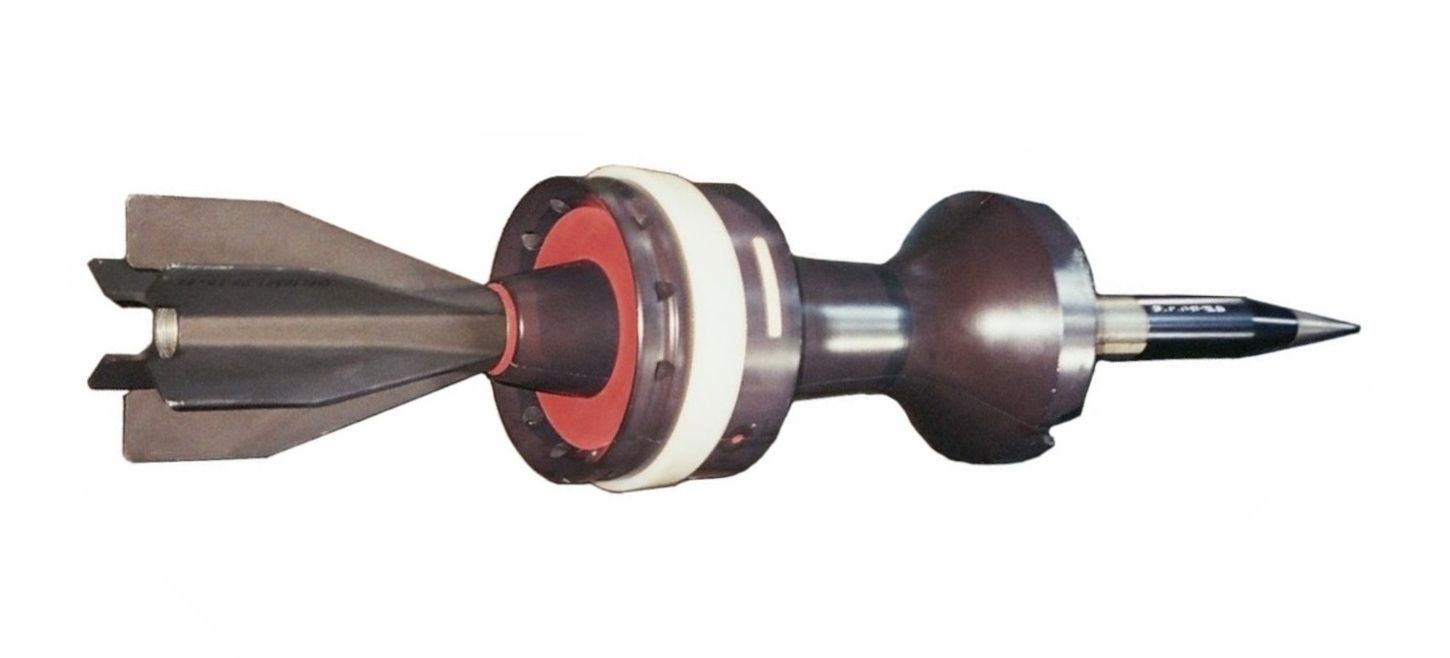
French OFL 120 F1 APFSDS long rod penetrator with "saddle-back" spindle sabot

=== Ring sabot ===
A ring sabot uses the rear fins on a long rod projectile to help center the projectile and ride the bore, and the multi-petal sabot forms only a single bulkhead ring around the projectile near the front, with an obturator sealing gases from escaping past it, and centering the front of the projectile. The former Soviet Union favored armor-piercing sabot projectiles using ring sabots, which performed acceptably for that era, manufactured from high strength steel for both the long rod penetrator and ring sabot. The strength of the steel ring was sufficient to withstand launch accelerations without the need for sabot ramps to also support the steel flight projectile.

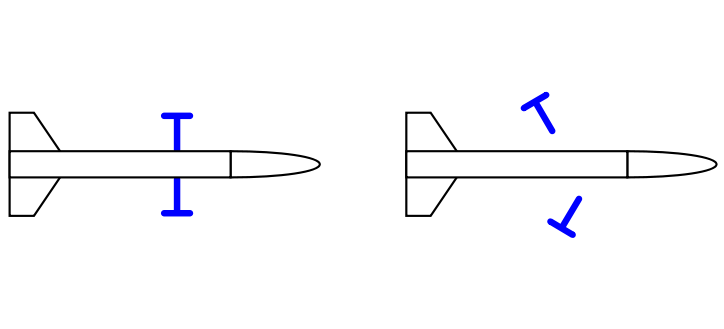
Ring sabot function

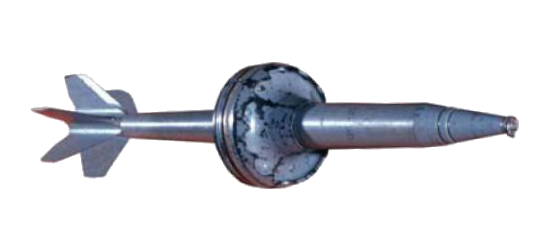
Soviet 125 mm BM-15 long rod penetrator projectile with ring sabot

== See also ==
- Glossary of firearms terms
- Shell (projectile)
- Gas check
- Wadding
