= Jwala =

Jwala may refer to:

- Jwala (1969 film), an Indian Malayalam-language film
- Jwala (1971 film), an Indian Hindi-language action film
- Jwala (1985 film), an Indian Telugu-language film
- Jwala (horse) (2009–2013), a British Thoroughbred racehorse
- Jwala chili pepper (also known as finger chili), a variety of Capsicum annuum common in Indian cuisine

== Given name ==
- Jwala Gutta (born 1983), Indian badminton player
- Jwala Prasad Kureel (1915–1991), Indian politician
- Jwala Kumari Sah (born 1981), Nepalese politician
- Jwala Prasad Srivastava (1889–1954), Indian industrialist and politician
- Jwala Singh, a fictional character in the 1982 Indian film Jeeo Aur Jeene Do
