= Jalaa (disambiguation) =

Jalaa language also known as Cèntûm, Centúúm or Cen Tuum, is an extinct language of northeastern Nigeria (Loojaa settlement in Balanga Local Government Area, Gombe State), of uncertain origins, apparently a language isolate.

Jalaa may also refer to:

- Al-Jalaa, a small city in eastern Syria, administratively part of the Deir ez-Zor Governorate, located along the Euphrates River
- Al-Jalaa Stadium, a multi-use stadium in Damascus, Syria, used mostly for football matches
- Jalaa SC, a Syrian multi-sports club based in the Syrian city of Aleppo, most notable with their football and basketball branches
- Güsemiin Jalaa (born 1949), Mongolian judoka
