= Jal-e Akhund Mahalleh =

Jal-e Akhund Mahalleh جل اخوندمحله
- Village
- Location within Iran
- Coordinates: 36°46′27″N 50°48′40″E
- Country: Iran
- Province: Mazandaran
- County: Tonekabon
- Bakhsh: Central
- Rural District: Goli Jan

Population (2006)
  - Total: 298
- Time zone: UTC+3:30 (IRST)
  - Summer (DST): UTC+4:30 (IRDT)

Jal-e Akhund Mahalleh (Persian: جل اخوندمحله, also Romanized as Jal-e Akhūnd Maḩalleh and Jall-e Akhūndmaḩalleh) is a village in Goli Jan Rural District, in the Central District of Tonekabon County, Mazandaran Province, Iran. At the 2006 census, its population was 298, in 80 families.
