= Jal-e Chala Sar =

Jal-e Chala Sar جل چلاسر
- Village
- Country: Iran
- Province: Mazandaran
- County: Tonekabon
- Bakhsh: Central
- Rural District: Goli Jan

Population (2006)
  - Total: 260
- Time zone: UTC+3:30 (IRST)
  - Summer (DST): UTC+4:30 (IRDT)

Jal-e Chala Sar (Persian: جل چلاسر, also Romanized as Jal-e Chalā Sar) is a village in Goli Jan Rural District, in the Central District of Tonekabon County, Mazandaran Province, Iran. At the 2006 census, its population was 260, in 71 families.
