= Driving band =

Artillery shell part

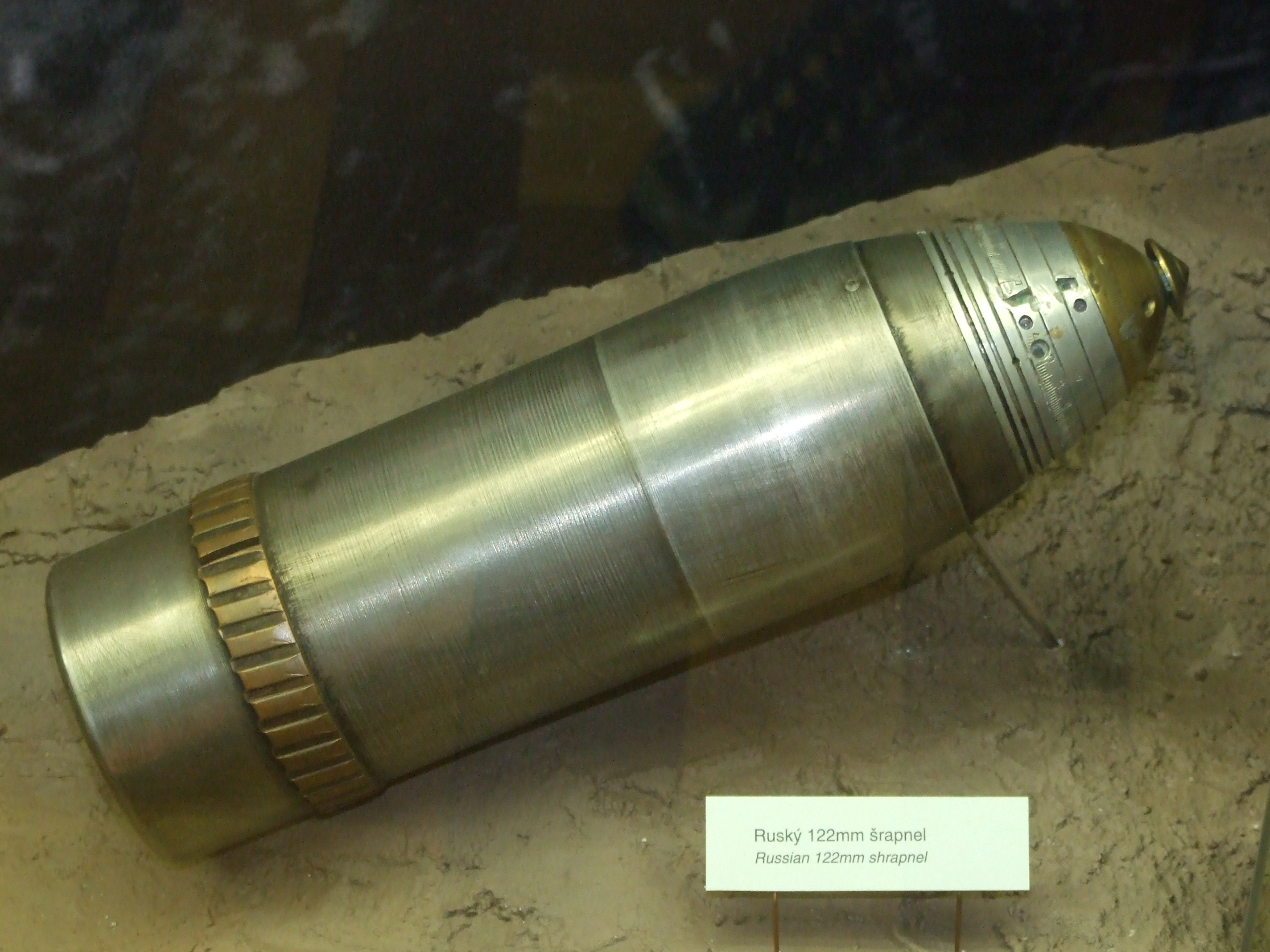
Russian 122 mm shrapnel shell, which has been fired, showing rifling marks on the copper driving band around its base and the steel bourrelet nearer the front

A driving band or rotating band is a band of soft metal near the base of an artillery shell, often made of gilding metal, copper, or lead. When the shell is fired, the pressure of the propellant swages the metal into the rifling of the barrel and forms a gas seal; this seal prevents the gases from blowing past the shell and engages the barrel's rifling to spin-stabilize the shell.

== Purpose ==
The rotating band has three essential functions:

- Center the rear end of the projectile in the gun barrel.
- Seal the bore to prevent burning powder gas from moving through the rifling grooves past the projectile.
- Engage with the rifling of the barrel to spin the projectile and stabilize its flight.

== Characteristics ==
The shell is stabilized for yaw in the barrel by a smaller bourrelet band near the front of the projectile. This band keeps the projectile travelling straight in the bore supported by the lands between the rifling grooves, but doesn't engage the rifling.

As shell weight increases, it becomes more difficult to engineer a driving band that prevents propellant gases from either blowing past it, or blowing it off the shell. Tougher alloys like cupronickel may be used on major-caliber projectiles. Rotating band width of about one-third of the projectile caliber provides superior performance, but two narrower bands, separated by a short distance, have been used to conserve strategic metals in wartime. Each band is secured in a dovetailed notch machined into the projectile. Waved ridges, longitudinal nicks, or knurling is machined into the bottom of the notch to prevent the band from slipping around the projectile as the projectile accelerates down the gun barrel. The rotating band is made of a ring of slightly greater diameter than the projectile, slipped into position while thermally expanded, and pressed radially into place with a powerful hydraulic banding press.

The forward edge of the band may be conically tapered to fit into a coned seat at the start of the gun barrel rifling. The central portion of the band is roughly cylindrical with a diameter slightly larger than the groove diameter of the gun barrel to ensure a tight fit in gun barrels worn by firing previous projectiles. The rear portion of the band may include a flared skirt of even larger diameter in front of a groove to hold the skirt as it is compressed by barrel dimensions. The skirt is intended to provide a gas seal in the most heavily eroded portion of the bore near the powder chamber.

== Variations ==
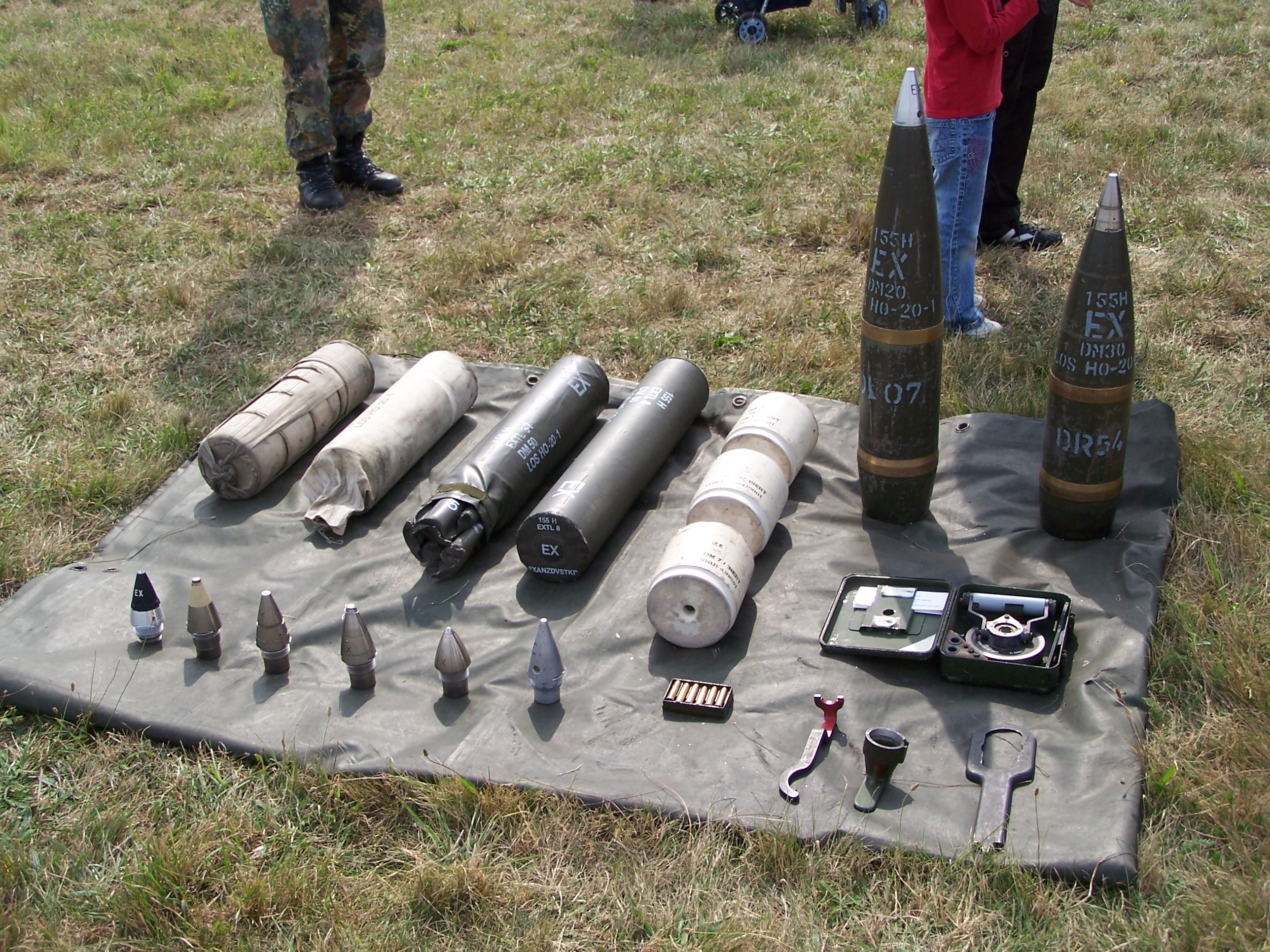
Modern 155 mm artillery ammunition – these shells are unusual in having two driving bands. The shell on the right is a modified M107.

Driving bands pre-cut for the rifling have been used for muzzle loaded weapons, e.g. some mortars. Freely rotating bands can be used to reduce the spin imparted to the round as is preferable for HEAT warheads or fin-stabilised projectiles fired from general-purpose rifled barrels.

Gerald Bull worked extensively on ways to eliminate the driving band, leading to the development of his Extended Range, Full Bore ammunition using an inversion of the pre-cut rifling for his GC-45 howitzer.

Some weapons that operate at high rates of fire, such as the GAU-8 Avenger Gatling cannon, use plastic driving bands instead of soft metal. Using plastic as a swage material reduces wear on the barrel's rifling, and extends the life and average accuracy of the weapon.

In a small-arms rifle, the entire bullet is typically covered in copper or another soft alloy, making the entire bullet its own driving band.

During World War II, German ammunition sometimes used iron driving bands instead of copper due to material shortages. Porous iron bands were favored over solid ones.

== See also ==
- Cannelure
- Gas check
- Obturation
- Sabot (firearms)
- Rotating gas-check
