= Jhalawar Road railway station =

Railway Station in Rajasthan, India

General information
- Location: Jhalawar City, Rajasthan; India
- Coordinates: 24.5422°N 75.9203°E
- Elevation: 362 metres (1,188 ft)
- System: Indian Railway station
- Owner: Indian Railways
- Platforms: 3
- Tracks: 4 (double electrified broad gauge)
- Connections: Auto stand

Construction
- Structure type: Standard (on ground station)
- Parking: No
- Cycle facilities: No

Other information
- Status: Functioning (Construction - Doubling of Diesel BG)
- Station code: JHW
- Zone(s): West Central Railway
- Division(s): Kota
- Fare zone: West Central Railway
Location

Jhalawar Road railway station is a small railway station in Jhalawar district, Rajasthan. Its code is JHW. It serves Jhalawar city. The station consists of three platforms. The platforms are not well sheltered. It lacks many facilities including water and sanitation. The station is 38 km from Jhalawar city before construction of line to Jhalawar city this station was main rail route.

== Major trains ==
- Kota Vadodara Passenger (unreserved)
- Bandra Terminus- Dehradun Express
- Firozpur Janata Express
- Mathura Ratlam Passenger (unreserved)
- Phulera Ratlam Fast Passenger
- Ratlam- Kota Passenger (unreserved)
