= Armour-piercing fin-stabilized discarding sabot =

Ammunition type for tanks

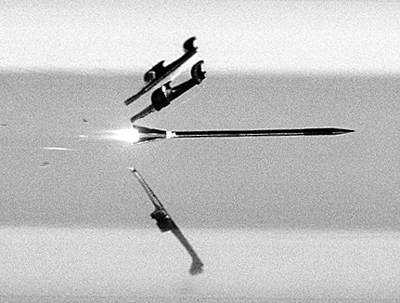
APFSDS at point of separation of sabot

Armour-piercing fin-stabilized discarding sabot (APFSDS), long dart penetrator, or simply dart ammunition is a type of kinetic energy penetrator ammunition used to attack modern vehicle armour. As an armament for main battle tanks, it succeeds armour-piercing discarding sabot (APDS) ammunition, which is still used in small or medium caliber weapon systems.

Improvements in automotive propulsion and suspension systems after World War II allowed modern main battle tanks to incorporate progressively thicker and heavier armor without unduly sacrificing maneuverability and speed. As a result, achieving deep armour penetration with gun-fired ammunition required even longer anti-armour projectiles fired at even higher muzzle velocity than could be achieved with stubbier APDS projectiles.

== History ==
GIF of APFSDS being fired

Armour-piercing discarding sabot (APDS) was initially the main design of the kinetic energy (KE) penetrator. The logical progression was to make the shot longer and thinner to increase its sectional density, thus concentrating the kinetic energy in a smaller area. However, a long, thin rod is aerodynamically unstable; it tends to tumble in flight and is less accurate. Traditionally, rounds were given gyroscopic stability in flight from the rifling of the gun barrel, which imparts a spin to the round. Up to a certain limit, this is effective, but once the projectile's length is more than six or seven times its diameter, the gyroscopic effect imparted by barrel rifling becomes less effective. Adding fins to the base of the round like the fletching of an arrow instead gives the round its stability in flight.

The spin from standard rifling decreases the performance of these rounds (rifling adds friction and converts some of the linear kinetic energy to rotational kinetic energy, thus decreasing the round's velocity, range and impact energy). A very high rotation on a fin-stabilized projectile can also increase aerodynamic drag, further reducing impact velocity. For these reasons APFSDS projectiles are generally fired from smoothbore guns, a practice that has been taken up for tank guns by western and eastern blocs. Nevertheless, in the early development of APFSDS ammunition, existing rifled barrel cannons were used, (and are still in use), such as the 105 mm M68/M68E1 cannon mounted on the M60/A1/A3 main battle tank or the British 120 mm Royal Ordnance L30 of the Challenger 2 tank. To reduce the spin rate when using a rifled barrel, a "slip obturator" is incorporated that allows the high-pressure propellant gases to seal, yet not transfer the total spin rate of the rifling into the projectile. The projectile still exits the barrel with some residual spinning, but at an acceptably low rate. In addition, some spin rate is beneficial to a fin-stabilized projectile, averaging out aerodynamic imbalances and improving accuracy. Even smooth-bore fired APFSDS projectiles incorporate fins that are slightly canted to provide some spin during flight, and very-low-twist rifled barrels have also been developed to fire APFSDS ammunition.

== Design ==
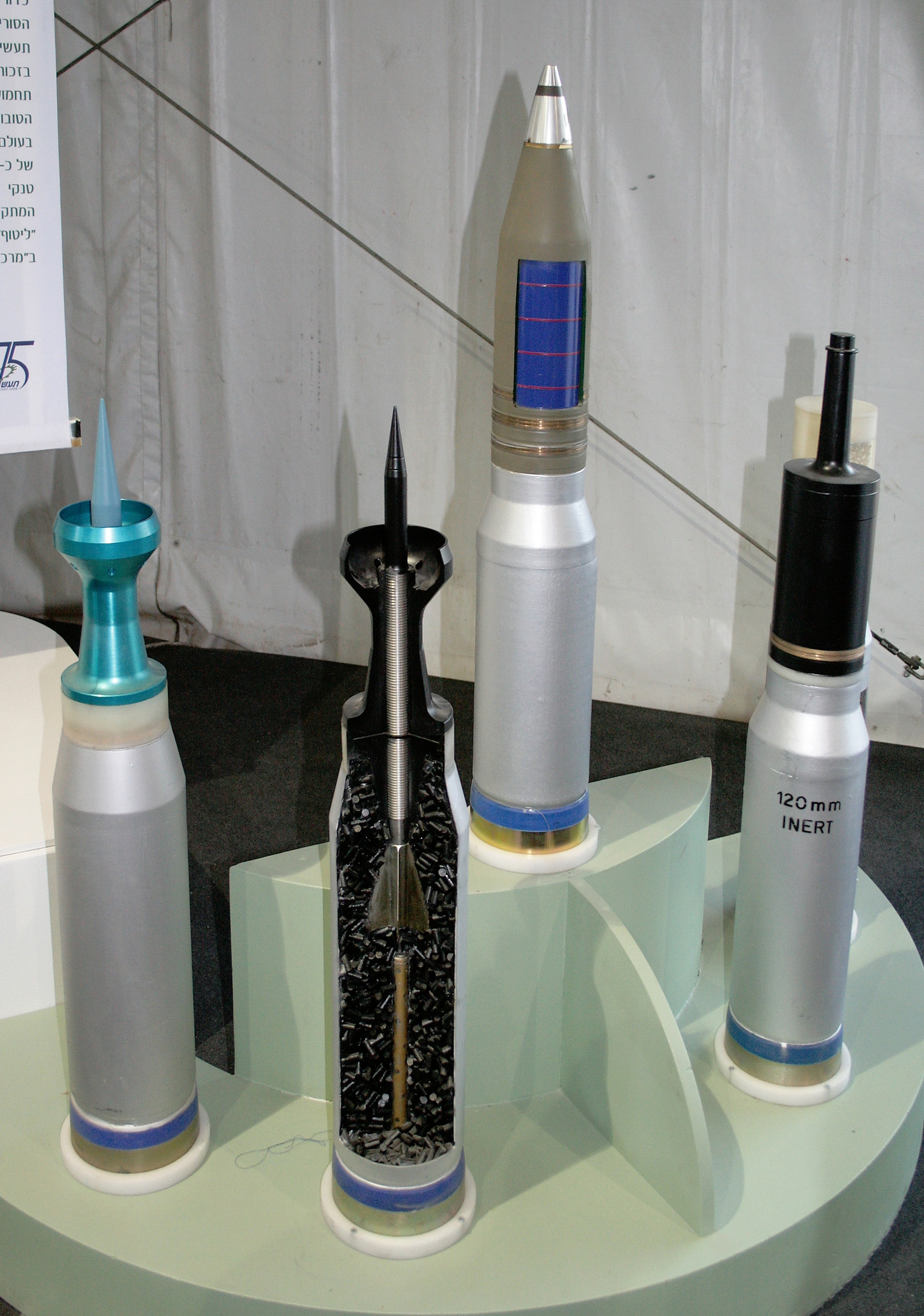
Modern 120 mm tank gun shells

KE penetrators for modern tanks are commonly 2–3 cm (0.787–1.18 in) in diameter, and can approach 80 cm (31.5 in) long. As more structurally efficient penetrator-sabot designs are developed, their length tends to increase to defeat greater line-of-sight armour depth.

=== Fluid penetration ===
The concept of armour defeat using a long rod penetrator is a practical application of the phenomenon of hydro-dynamic penetration.

Practical penetrator and target materials are not fluids before impact, but at sufficiently high impact velocity even crystalline materials begin to behave in a highly plastic fluid-like manner.

Long rod projectiles penetrate a fluid in the literal sense, based simply on the density of the target armour and the density and length of the penetrator. The penetrator will continue to displace the target to a depth of the penetrator length times the square root of the penetrator to target densities. One observes immediately that longer, denser penetrators will penetrate to deeper depths, and this forms the basis for the development of long-rod anti-armour projectiles.

The important parameters for an effective long-rod penetrator, therefore, are very high density with respect to the target, high hardness to penetrate hard target surfaces, very high toughness (ductility) so the rod does not shatter on impact, and very high strength to survive gun launch accelerations, as well as the variabilities of target impact, such as hitting at an oblique angle and surviving counter-measures such as explosive-reactive armor.

=== Tungsten and depleted uranium ===
While penetrator geometry has adapted to reactive armour counter-measures, tungsten heavy alloy (WHA) and depleted uranium (DU) alloy continue to be preferred materials. Both are dense, hard, tough, ductile, and strong; all qualities suitable for deep armor penetration.

Depleted uranium alloy, for example, is pyrophoric; the heated fragments of the penetrator ignite after impact in contact with air, setting fire to fuel and / or ammunition in the target vehicle, contributing significantly to behind-armour lethality. Additionally, DU penetrators exhibit significant adiabatic shear band formation. A common misconception is that, during impact, fractures along these bands cause the tip of the penetrator to continuously shed material, maintaining the tip's conical shape, whereas other materials such as unjacketed tungsten tend to deform into a less effective rounded profile, an effect called "mushrooming". The formation of adiabatic shear bands actually means that the sides of the "mushroom" tend to break away earlier, leading to a smaller head on impact, though it will still be significantly "mushroomed".

Tests have shown that the hole bored by a DU projectile is of a narrower diameter than for a similar tungsten projectile. Although both materials have nearly the same density, hardness, toughness, and strength, due to these differences in their deformation, depleted uranium tends to out-penetrate an equivalent length of tungsten alloy against steel targets. The use of depleted uranium, in spite of some superior performance characteristics, provokes political and humanitarian controversy, but remains the preferred material for some countries due to lower cost and greater availability than tungsten. Tungsten itself has been found to be biologically hazardous and creates exposure hazards only somewhat milder than depleted uranium.

==== Microparticle tungsten ====
In some countries, such as South Korea, specific heat treatment processes such as multi-stage cyclic heat treatment and microstructure control are applied to tungsten penetrators to finely separate metallic grain structures, significantly improving the mushrooming deformation, which was a chronic problem for conventional tungsten alloys, increasing penetration by 8–16% and impact toughness by 300%. This results in the microparticle tungsten penetrator causing self-sharpening behavior equivalent to that of the DU penetrator.

=== Sabot design ===
Typical velocities of the APFSDS rounds vary between manufacturers and muzzle length/types. As a typical example, the American General Dynamics KEW-A1 has a muzzle velocity of 1,740 m/s (5,700 ft/s). This compares to ~914 m/s (3,000 ft/s) for a 5.56 mm round fired from an M16 rifle. APFSDS rounds generally operate in the range of 1,400 to 1,800 m/s (4,593 to 5,906 ft/s). Above a minimum impact velocity necessary to overcome target material strength parameters significantly, penetrator length is more important than impact velocity; as exemplified by the fact that the base model M829 flies nearly 200 m/s (656 ft/s) faster than the newer model M829A3, but is only about one half the length, wholly inadequate for defeating state-of-the-art armor arrays.

Complicating matters, when foreign deployment of military forces or export sales markets are considered, a sabot designed specifically to launch a DU penetrator cannot simply be used to launch a substitute WHA penetrator, even of exactly the same manufactured geometry. The two materials behave differently under high pressure, high launch acceleration forces, such that entirely different sabot material geometries, (thicker or thinner in some places, if even possible), are required to maintain in-bore structural integrity.

Often the greater engineering challenge is designing an efficient sabot to successfully launch extremely long penetrators, now approaching 80 cm (31 in) in length. The sabot, necessary to fill the bore of the cannon when firing a long, slender flight projectile, is parasitic weight that subtracts from the potential muzzle velocity of the entire projectile. Maintaining the in-bore structural integrity of such a long flight projectile under accelerations of tens of thousands of g's is not a trivial undertaking, and has brought the design of sabots from employing in the early 1980s readily available low cost, high strength aerospace-grade aluminums, such as 6061 and 6066-T6, to high strength and more expensive 7075-T6 aluminum, maraging steel, and experimental ultra-high strength 7090-T6 aluminum, to the current state-of-the-art and expensive graphite fiber reinforced plastics, in order to further reduce the parasitic sabot mass, that could be nearly half the launch mass of the entire projectile.

The discarding sabot petals travel at such a high muzzle velocity that, on separation, they may continue for many hundreds of feet at speeds that can be lethal to troops and damaging to light vehicles. For this reason, tank gunners have to be aware of danger to nearby troops.

The saboted flechette was the counterpart of APFSDS in rifle ammunition. A rifle for firing flechettes, the Special Purpose Individual Weapon, was under development for the US Army, but the project was abandoned.

== See also ==
- Compact Kinetic Energy Missile
- Impact depth
- Kinetic bombardment
- MGM-166 LOSAT
