= KE-W =

US/NATO tank round used by tanks

Kinetic Energy Tungsten
- Type: Tank round
- Place of origin: United States

Service history
- Used by: Taiwan, Poland, Kuwait, Iraq, Morocco, Egypt, Saudi Arabia, Australia
- Wars: Persian Gulf War; Global War on Terrorism; Iraq War; War in Afghanistan; Russo-Ukrainian War; Russian invasion of Ukraine

Production history
- Designer: General Dynamics Ordnance and Tactical Systems
- Designed: 1992
- Manufacturer: General Dynamics Ordnance and Tactical Systems
- Unit cost: $8,500 USD
- Produced: 1993-present

Specifications
- Mass: 19.6 kg (with casing) 4 kg (penetrator)
- Length: 22.45 in (with casing)
- Barrel length: 16.45 in (penetrator)
- Diameter: 120mm (with casing)
- Cartridge: 120x570mm NATO
- Cartridge weight: 15.6 kg
- Caliber: 120x570mm
- Rate of fire: 6 seconds (average)
- Muzzle velocity: 1740 m/s
- Effective firing range: 3 km
- Maximum firing range: 6 km

The KE-W APFSDS (Kinetic Energy, Tungsten) round is a type of armor-piercing fin-stabilized discarding sabot (APFSDS) ammunition made out of tungsten. It is designed for large-caliber guns, such as those found on main battle tanks.

== Overview ==
The KE-W round is known for its exceptional armor-penetrating capabilities, utilizing kinetic energy to defeat armored targets. It is commonly used by modern main battle tanks as their primary anti-tank ammunition. The round is mainly used on the NATO 120x570mm cannons. The main users are the American Abrams tank, and the German Leopard tank.

== Design and components ==
The round consists of a sub-calibre penetrator made of tungsten, enclosed in a discarding sabot. The sabot provides stability during the initial stages of flight and is discarded upon exiting the barrel, allowing the penetrator to continue towards the target with high velocity.

Round	Year Introduced	Description
KE-W Terminator	1996	
KE-W A1	1999–2000	
KE-W A2	2003	based on the M829A2.
KE-W A3		A2 with more powerful propellant
KE-W A4	2022	DM63

== Performance ==
Due to its high muzzle velocity and dense tungsten penetrator, the KE-W APFSDS round can penetrate thick armor, making it effective against heavily armored vehicles. The kinetic energy transfer upon impact contributes to its effectiveness in defeating armored targets.

== Usage ==
The KE-W APFSDS round is widely used by various military forces around the world. It is a crucial component of a tank's ammunition loadout, providing the capability to engage and destroy enemy armored vehicles at extended ranges. It is also used by the M1 Abrams Main battle tank.
