= CKEM =

CKEM may refer to:

- CKEM-DT, a television station in Edmonton, Alberta, Canada
- Compact Kinetic Energy Missile, a guided missile.
