= Kinetic energy penetrator =

High density non-explosive projectile

French anti-tank round with its sabot

A kinetic energy penetrator (KEP), also known as long-rod penetrator (LRP), is a type of ammunition designed to penetrate vehicle armour using a flechette-like, high-sectional density projectile. Like a bullet or kinetic energy weapon, this type of ammunition does not contain explosive payloads and uses purely kinetic energy to penetrate the target. Modern KEP munitions are typically of the armour-piercing fin-stabilized discarding sabot (APFSDS) type.

== History ==
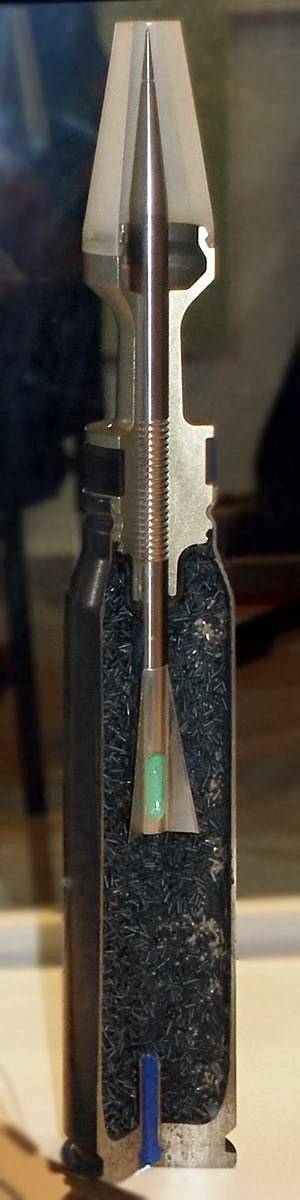
A partly cut-away 30 × 173 mm APFSDS-T round

Early cannons fired kinetic energy ammunition, initially consisting of heavy balls of worked stone and later of dense metals. From the beginning, combining high muzzle energy with projectile weight and hardness have been the foremost factors in the design of such weapons. Similarly, the foremost purpose of such weapons has generally been to defeat protective shells of armored vehicles or other defensive structures, whether it is stone walls, sailship timbers, or modern tank armour. Kinetic energy ammunition, in its various forms, has consistently been the choice for those weapons due to the highly focused terminal ballistics.

The development of the modern KE penetrator combines two aspects of artillery design, high muzzle velocity and concentrated force. High muzzle velocity is achieved by using a projectile with a low mass and large base area in the gun barrel. Firing a small-diameter projectile wrapped in a lightweight outer shell, called a sabot, raises the muzzle velocity. Once the shell clears the barrel, the sabot is no longer needed and falls off in pieces. This leaves the projectile traveling at high velocity with a smaller cross-sectional area and reduced aerodynamic drag during the flight to the target (see external ballistics and terminal ballistics). Germany developed modern sabots under the name "treibspiegel" ("thrust mirror") to give extra altitude to its anti-aircraft guns during the Second World War. Before this, primitive wooden sabots had been used for centuries in the form of a wooden plug attached to or breech loaded before cannonballs in the barrel, placed between the propellant charge and the projectile. The name "sabot" (pronounced /ˈsæboʊ/ SAB-oh in English usage) is the French word for clog (a wooden shoe traditionally worn in some European countries).

Concentration of force into a smaller area was initially attained by replacing the single metal (usually steel) shot with a composite shot using two metals, a heavy core (based on tungsten) inside a lighter metal outer shell. These designs were known as armour-piercing composite rigid (APCR) by the British, high-velocity armor-piercing (HVAP) by the US, and hartkern (hard core) by the Germans. On impact, the core had a much more concentrated effect than plain metal shot of the same weight and size. The air resistance and other effects were the same as for the shell of identical size. High-velocity armor-piercing (HVAP) rounds were primarily used by tank destroyers in the US Army and were relatively uncommon as the tungsten core was expensive and prioritized for other applications.

Between 1941 and 1943, the British combined the two techniques in the armour-piercing discarding sabot (APDS) round. The sabot replaced the outer metal shell of the APCR. While in the gun, the shot had a large base area to get maximum acceleration from the propelling charge but once outside, the sabot fell away to reveal a heavy shot with a small cross-sectional area. APDS rounds served as the primary kinetic energy weapon of most tanks during the early-Cold War period, though they suffered the primary drawback of inaccuracy. This was resolved with the introduction of the armour-piercing fin-stabilized discarding sabot (APFSDS) round during the 1970s, which added stabilising fins to the penetrator, greatly increasing accuracy.

== Design ==
The principle of the kinetic energy penetrator is that it uses its kinetic energy, which is a function of its mass and velocity, to force its way through armor. If the armor is defeated, the heat and spalling (particle spray) generated by the penetrator going through the armor, and the pressure wave that develops, ideally destroys the target.

The modern kinetic energy weapon maximizes the stress (kinetic energy divided by impact area) delivered to the target by:

- maximizing the mass – that is, using the densest metals practical, which is one of the reasons depleted uranium or tungsten carbide is often used – and muzzle velocity of the projectile, as kinetic energy scales with the mass m and the square of the velocity v of the projectile $(mv^2/2).$
- minimizing the width, since if the projectile does not tumble, it will hit the target face first. As most modern projectiles have circular cross-sectional areas, their impact area will scale with the square of the radius r (the impact area being $\pi r^2$). For the same reason, "self-sharpening" through the generation of adiabatic shear bands is also a desired feature for the projectile material.

The penetrator length plays a large role in determining the ultimate depth of penetration. Generally, a penetrator is incapable of penetrating deeper than its own length, as the sheer stress of impact and perforation ablates it. This has led to the current designs which resemble a long metal arrow.

For monobloc penetrators made of a single material, a perforation formula devised by Wili Odermatt and W. Lanz can calculate the penetration depth of an APFSDS round.

In 1982, an analytical investigation drawing from concepts of gas dynamics and experiments on target penetration led to the conclusion on the efficiency of impactors that penetration is deeper using unconventional three-dimensional shapes.

== See also ==
- Compact Kinetic Energy Missile
- Earthquake bomb
- Flechette
- Hellfire R9X
- Impact depth
- Kinetic bombardment
- MGM-166 LOSAT
- Röchling shell
