= Tantalum–tungsten alloys =

Tantalum–tungsten alloys are in the refractory metals group that maintain useful physical and chemical properties even at high temperatures. The tantalum–tungsten alloys are characterized by their high melting points and tension resistance. The properties of the final alloy are a combination of properties from the two elements: tungsten, the element with the highest melting point, and tantalum, which has high corrosion resistance.

Tantalum–tungsten alloys typically vary in their percentage of tungsten. Some common variants are:

- (Ta – 2.5% W): also called tantaloy 63 metal. The percentage of tungsten is about 2–3% and includes 0.5% of niobium. This alloy has a good resistance to corrosion and performs well at high temperatures. An example application is piping in chemical industries.
- (Ta – 7.5% W): also called tantaloy 61 metal, has 7–8% tungsten. The difference from this alloy to the others is that this alloy represents a high resilience modulus while maintaining its refractory properties.
- (Ta – 10% W): also called tantaloy 60 metal, contains 9–11% tungsten. This alloy is less ductile than the other alloys and exhibits less plasticity. Applications include high-temperature, high-corrosion environments such as aerospace components, furnaces, and piping in nuclear plants.

== Mechanical properties ==
The alloys of tantalum–tungsten have high corrosion resistance and refractory properties. The crystalline structure of the material is body-centered cubic with a substitutional solid solution with atoms of tungsten. The alloy also has a high melting point and can reach high elastic modulus and high tensile strength.

Mechanical Properties of Ta-W Alloys
Alloys	Hardness (HV)	Density (g/cm^{3})	Melting point (^{o}c)	Tensile strength (MPa)	Yield Strength (MPa)	Elastic Modulus (GPa)
Ta – 2.5% W	130	16.7	3005	345	230	195
Ta – 7.5% W	245	16.8	3030	550	460	205
Ta – 10% W	325–400	16.8	3025	1035–1165	875–1005	200

== Phase diagram ==
The equilibrium phase diagram of the alloy formed between the two components is a binary diagram where the two components are totally soluble in each other. In this diagram, the melting temperatures of the two elements are shown. It can be seen that there are two lines, representing the solidus and liquidus.

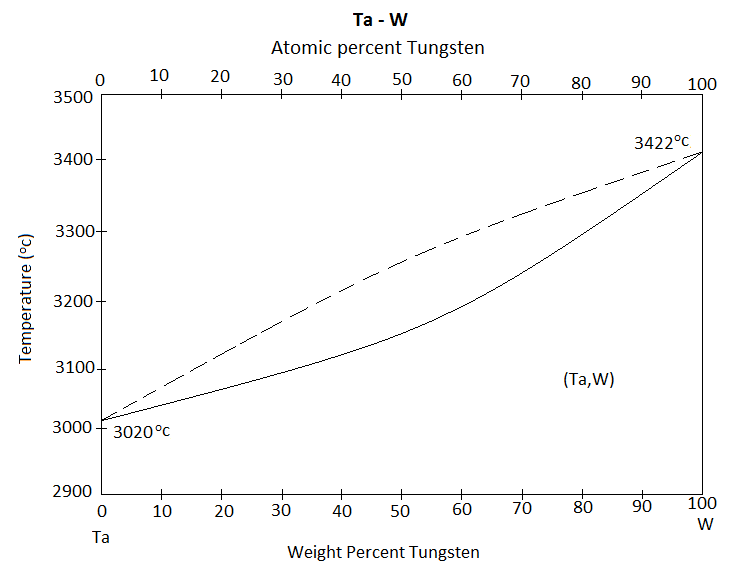
Binary Phase Diagram (Ta–W)
