= MGM-166 LOSAT =

Cancelled 1990s-2000s U.S. anti-tank missile

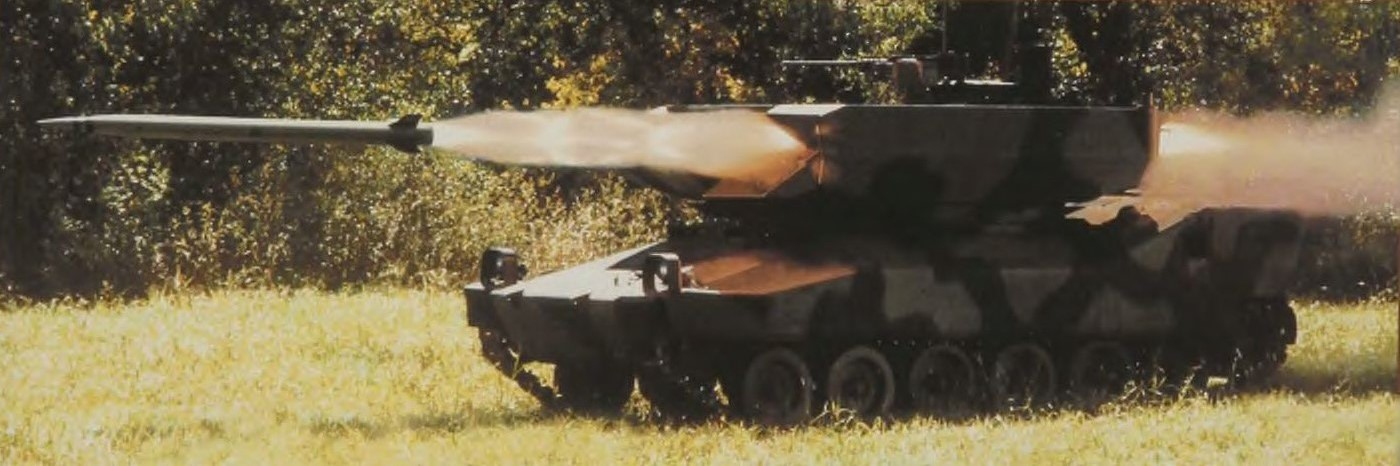
An artist's impression of a LOSAT system firing from a CCVL chassis

The MGM-166 LOSAT (Line-of-Sight Anti-Tank) was a United States anti-tank missile system developed in the 1990s by Lockheed Martin (originally Vought), to defeat tanks and other individual targets. Instead of using a high explosive anti-tank (HEAT) warhead like other anti-tank missiles, LOSAT employed a solid steel kinetic energy penetrator (KEM) to punch through armor. The LOSAT was fairly light, designed to be mounted on a Humvee light military vehicle, allowing the system to be air-portable. After testing in the 2000s, LOSAT development ended, but was the basis for later development of the smaller Compact Kinetic Energy Missile.

== History ==
=== HVM ===
LOSAT developed out of an earlier Vought project, the Hyper-Velocity Missile (HVM), a multi-platform weapon supported by the US Air Force (for the Fairchild Republic A-10 Thunderbolt II) and by the US Army and US Marine Corps (for helicopters and other vehicles). The HVM offered performance similar to existing systems, like the AGM-114 Hellfire, but offered a semi-fire-and-forget operation through the use of forward-looking infrared (FLIR) tracking, and guidance commands sent to it via a low-power laser. It could be carried on any platform that had FLIR capability, with its self-contained command guidance system able to be carried externally, or potentially integrated into existing target designators. With the end of the Cold War, the Air Force pulled out of the project, with HVM development work apparently ending in the late 1980s.

=== AAWS-H ===
At about the same time, in 1988, the Army released a new requirement for a ground-based anti-tank system, known as Advanced Anti-Tank Weapon System - Heavy, or AAWS-H for short. AAWS-H specified an air-liftable lightweight system with the capability to knock out any existing or near-future tank outside its own gun range. The TOW missile could be guided from concealed locations, but did not offer the needed range and its relatively slow flight speeds (~250 m/s versus 1650 m/s for HVM) left it vulnerable to counterattack from the target while the missile was in flight.

To fill AAWS-H, Vought developed a slightly larger extended-range version of HVM known as Kinetic Energy Missile (KEM), while its partner, Texas Instruments, provided a new FLIR targeting system that it was already working on as a TOW upgrade. Several vehicles were studied to mount the system, including the front-runner M2 Bradley, as well as the M8 Armored Gun System. However, in order to reduce costs and improve air mobility in a post–Cold War world, LOSAT eventually emerged on an extended-length heavy-duty Humvee with a hard-top containing four KEMs ready to fire, along with a trailer containing another eight rounds in two-round packs. The new guidance system could keep two missiles in flight to separate targets, allowing the vehicle to salvo fire its weapons against a tank squadron in a few seconds. Reaching speeds of 1,500 m/s (5,000 ft/s), LOSAT was in the air from launch to maximum range for under four seconds, making counterfire extremely difficult. The range was beyond that of existing main tank guns, allowing the LOSAT to fire and move before tanks could maneuver into a position to return fire.

The first KEMs were test fired in 1990, and a contract for continued development was placed by the Army. This was much slower in pace, and it was only in 1997 that an Advanced Technology Concept Demonstrator program started to bring the system to production quality. The contract called for 12 LOSAT vehicles and 144 KEMs, to be delivered by 2003. Even before this contract was complete, the Army asked for a production run of another 108 missiles in August 2002. The first of the 12 LOSAT units was delivered in October 2002, and the system began a series of 18 production-qualification test firings in August 2003, at White Sands Missile Range in New Mexico. By March 2004, 18 KEMs had been fired at targets under a variety of conditions, both during the day and night. Another 8 were fired in the summer of 2004 at Fort Bliss as part of a user-testing exercise.

=== Cancellation ===
By the time the test program was finished it was obvious the Army was going to cancel LOSAT after the low-rate initial production (LRIP) batch of about 435 missiles was delivered. By this point the Army had already started work on a system known as the Compact Kinetic Energy Missile (or CKEM), based on the LOSAT concepts but smaller and lighter, more in tune with real-world threats. As it turned out, even the LRIP contract was never funded, and the LOSAT program terminated.
