= Adiabatic shear band =

Failure mechanism within deformed materials

In physics, mechanics and engineering, an adiabatic shear band is one of the many mechanisms of failure that occur in metals and other materials that are deformed at a high rate in processes such as metal forming, machining and ballistic impact. Adiabatic shear bands are usually very narrow bands, typically 5-500 μm wide and consisting of highly sheared material. Adiabatic is a thermodynamic term meaning an absence of heat transfer – the heat produced is retained in the zone where it is created. (The opposite extreme, where all heat that is produced is conducted away, is isothermal.)

== Deformation ==
It is necessary to include some basics of plastic deformation to understand the link between heat produced and the plastic work done. If we carry out a compression test on a cylindrical specimen to, say, 50% of its original height, the stress of the work material will increase usually significantly with reduction. This is called 'work hardening'. During work hardening, the micro-structure, distortion of grain structure and the generation and glide of dislocations all occur. The remainder of the plastic work done – which can be as much as 90% of the total, is dissipated as heat.

If the plastic deformation is carried out under dynamic conditions, such as by drop forging, then the plastic deformation is localized more as the forging hammer speed is increased. This also means that the deformed material becomes hotter the higher the speed of the drop hammer. Now as metals become warmer, their resistance to further plastic deformation decreases. From this point we can see that there is a type of cascade effect: as more plastic deformation is absorbed by the metal, more heat is produced, making it easier for the metal to deform further. This is a catastrophic effect which almost inevitably leads to failure.

== History ==
The first person to carry out any reported experimental programme to investigate the heat produced as a result of plastic deformation was Henri Tresca in June 1878. Tresca forged a bar of platinum (as well as many other metals); at the moment of forging the metal had just cooled down below red heat. The subsequent blow of the steam hammer, which left a depression in the bar and lengthened it, also reheated it in the direction of two lines in the form of a letter X. So great was this reheating, the metal along these lines was fully restored for some seconds to red heat. Tresca carried out many forging experiments on different metals. Tresca estimated the amount of plastic work converted into heat from a large number of experiments, and it was always above 70%.

== Tungsten heavy alloys ==
Tungsten heavy alloys (WHAs) possess high density, strength and toughness, making them good candidates for kinetic energy penetrator applications. When compared with depleted uranium, another material often used for kinetic penetrators, WHAs exhibit much less adiabatic shear band formation. During ballistic impact, the formation of shear bands produces a "self-sharpening" effect, aiding penetration by minimizing the surface area at the leading edge of the projectile. The average width of the shear band, then, should also be minimized to improve performance.

It has been proposed that formation of adiabatic shear bands in WHAs could be promoted by the presence of stress concentrations. When different specimen geometries were tested, cylindrical specimens without geometric stress concentrations were the least prone to shear band formation. Shear bands tend to form at these initiation points and travel along the directions of greatest shear stress. Several WHA processing methods have been investigated to increase the propensity for shear band formation. Leveraging hot-hydrostatic extrusion and/or hot torsion has been shown to elongate the tungsten grains in the microstructure. When subjected to high strain rate deformation parallel to the direction of the grain elongation, adiabatic shear bands readily form and propagate along the Ni-Fe matrix phase. The flow stress of the matrix is much lower than that of tungsten, so texturing of the microstructure provides an easier path for propagation of shear bands.

In 2019, a novel WHA was fabricated, replacing the traditional Ni-Fe matrix phase with a high entropy alloy matrix. This system was found to easily induce adiabatic shear band formation. The matrix phase includes nanoprecipitates that increase the matrix hardness. It is posited that these precipitates dissolve upon temperature rise, leading to softening of the matrix along the shear zone, thereby reducing the barrier for shear band propagation.
