= Impact depth =

Depth of projectile penetration

The impact depth of a projectile is the distance it penetrates into a target before coming to a stop. The problem was first treated mathematically by Isaac Newton in book II, section 3 of his Principia Mathematica, first published in 1687, as part of his study of the motion of bodies in resistive media.

== Newton's approximation ==
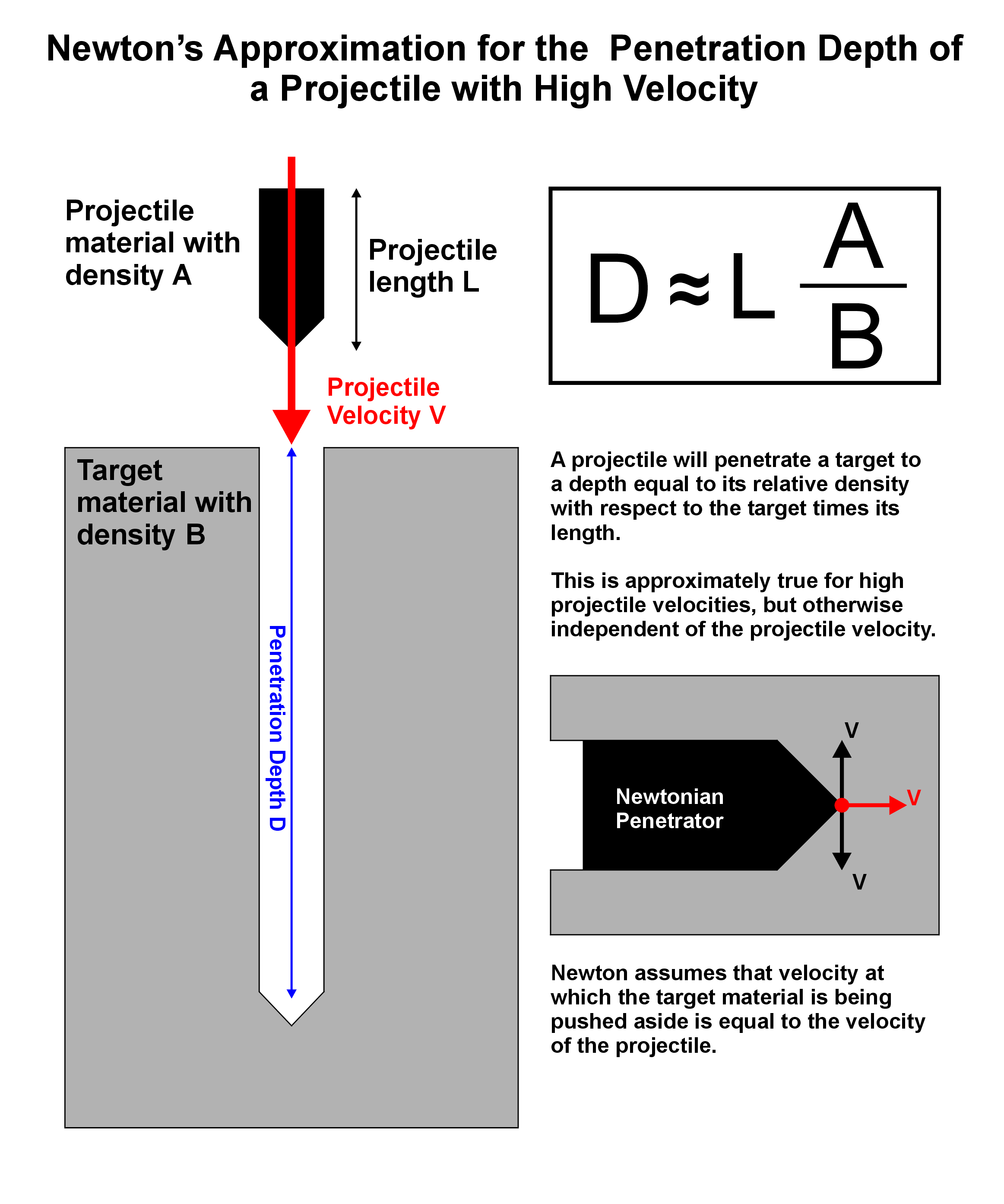
Illustration of Newton's theory of penetration of projectiles into a medium, based on the treatment by George Gamow in his Biography of Physics (1961).

Book II of Newton's Principia is concerned with the motion of solid bodies in resistive fluid media. It introduces the concepts that were later named "viscosity" and "drag" and obtained some of the first mathematical results in fluid mechanics. In section 3, Newton considered the case in which the resistance force exerted by the medium depends in part on the speed of the solid (viscous damping) and in part on the square of the speed (as seen in turbulent drag). The following explanation of impact depth is based on George Gamow's modern and simplified account of Newton's theory. This argument depends only on conservation of momentum. Nothing is said about where the impactor's kinetic energy goes, nor what happens to the momentum after the projectile is stopped.

At sufficiently high velocities, the friction between the surface of the impactor and the target medium can be neglected. The impactor will stop when its initial momentum is wholly transferred to the target. The average velocity with which the medium is pushed aside by the penetration of the impactor is approximately the same as the velocity of the impactor. This implies that the impactor will stop when it has pushed aside a mass of target material equal to the mass of the impactor itself. For a cylindrical impactor of length $L$ and density $\rho_i$ entering a target material of density $\rho_m$, this implies that the penetration depth $D$ is approximately given by

$$D \simeq L \frac{\rho_i}{\rho_m} .$$

This implies that the impact depth can be increased by increasing $L$ and $\rho_i$, but that the impact depth does not depend strongly on the impact speed. According to Gamow,

It is interesting that the length of penetration does not depend on the initial velocity of the projectile (provided that this velocity is sufficiently high). This is the fact that puzzled the U.S. military experts who were dropping from different heights the explosive missiles which were supposed to burrow deep into the ground before busting up. The penetration did not seem to change with the height from which the missiles were dropped (thus hitting the ground which different velocities) and the experts were scratching their heads until somebody pointed out to them a theory on that subject in Newton's Principia.

The above argument is valid only if the velocity is high enough to ignore friction, but lower than the speed of sound in the target material. If the impact velocity exceeds the sound speed, the impactor will generate shock waves that carry momentum and can cause the material to fracture. At very high velocities, rapid ejection of the target and impactor will produce an impact crater whose depth depends on the material properties of the impact and target, as well as on the velocity of the impact. Typically, a higher impact velocity results in a greater crater depth.

== Applications ==
- Projectile: Full metal projectiles should be made of a material with a very high density, like uranium (19.1 g/cm^{3}) or lead (11.3 g/cm^{3}). According to Newton's approximation, a full metal projectile made of uranium will pierce through roughly 2.5 times its own length of steel armor.
- Shaped charge: For a shaped charge (anti-tank) to pierce through steel plates, it is essential that the explosion generates a long heavy metal jet (in a shaped charge for anti-tank use, the explosion generates a high speed metal jet from the cone shaped metal lining). This jet may then be viewed as the impactor of Newton's approximation.
- Meteorite: As may be concluded from the air pressure, the atmosphere's material is equivalent to about 10 m of water. Since ice has about the same density as water, an ice cube from space travelling at 15 km/s or so must have a length of 10 m to reach the surface of the earth at high speed. A smaller ice cube will be slowed to terminal velocity. A larger ice cube may also be slowed, however, as long as it comes in at a very low angle and thus has to pierce through a lot of atmosphere. An iron meteorite with a length of 1.3 m would punch through the atmosphere; a smaller one would be slowed by the air and fall at terminal velocity to the ground.
- Impactor, bunker buster: Solid impactors can be used instead of nuclear warheads to penetrate bunkers deep underground. According to Newton's approximation, a uranium projectile (density 19 g/cm^{3}) at high speed and 1 m in length would punch its way through 6 m of rock (density 3 g/cm^{3}) before coming to a stop.

== See also ==
- Impact force
- Terminal ballistics
