= Compact Kinetic Energy Missile =

Cancelled 2000s U.S. anti-tank missile

The Compact Kinetic Energy Missile (CKEM) was a developmental program to produce a hypersonic anti-tank guided missile for the U.S. Army. Lockheed Martin was the primary contractor. The program was the third in a series of projects based on kinetic energy missiles that stretches back to 1981's Vought HVM through the 1990s to 2000s LOSAT and finally to the CKEM. The Army Aviation and Missile Command (AMCOM) developed this program as part of the Army's Future Combat Systems. This missile was primarily an anti-tank weapon, and could be mounted on land vehicles and low-altitude aircraft. The goal of these weapons was to demonstrate a state-of-the-art system for the next generation. The program was cancelled in 2009 with the rest of the future combat systems program.

== Specifications ==
(Lockheed Martin)

- Length: 1.524 m (5 ft 0 in)
- Motor: Solid-fuel rocket
- Max range: 10 km (6.2 mi)
- Operational range: 400–8,000 m (1,300–26,200 ft)
- Max weight: 45.359 kg (100.00 lb)
- Velocity: Mach 6.5 (7,260 ft/s; 2,210 m/s)
- Warhead: Kinetic energy penetrator
- Penetrator energy: 10 MJ (2.4 kilograms of TNT)

== Program status ==
- October 2003 – Lockheed Martin receives $21.3 million contract for CKEM Advanced Technology Demonstration (ATD) phase.
- September 2006 – The CKEM was successfully flight tested against a reinforced urban structure.
- February 2007 – A T-72 tank equipped with Explosive Reactive Armor was successfully engaged using CKEM at a range of 3400 meters. The test took place at Eglin Air Force Base, FL.
