= Miller twist rule =

Method to assess the torsional load in shafts

Miller twist rule is a mathematical formula derived by American physical chemist and historian of science Donald G. Miller (1927–2012) to determine the rate of twist to apply to a given bullet to provide optimum stability using a rifled barrel. Miller suggests that, while Greenhill's formula works well, there are better and more precise methods for determining the proper twist rate that are no more difficult to compute.

== Formula ==
A diagram of a .30-06 Springfield showing the bullet diameter (7.85 mm) and length (31.28 mm).

The following formula is one recommended by Miller:

${t}^2 = \frac{30m}{d^3l(1+l^2)s}$

where

- m is the bullet mass in grains (defined as 64.79891 milligrams)
- s is the gyroscopic stability factor (dimensionless)
- d is the bullet diameter in inches
- l is the bullet length in calibers (that is, length in relation to the diameter)
- t is the twist rate in calibers per turn

Also, since one "caliber" in this context is one bullet diameter, we have:

${t} = {T}/{d}$

where $T$ is the twist rate in inches per turn, and

${l} = {L}/{d}$

where $L$ is the bullet length in inches.

=== Stability factor ===
Solving Miller's formula for $s$ gives the stability factor for a known bullet and twist rate:

${s} = \frac{30m}{d^3l(1+l^2)t^2}$

or

${s} = \frac{30m}{L(1+L^2/d^2)T^2}$

=== Twist in inches per turn ===
Solving the formula for $T$ gives the twist rate in inches per turn:

${T} = \sqrt{\frac{30m}{dL(1+l^2)s}}$

=== Notes ===
Note that the constant 30 in the formula is Miller's rough approximation of velocity (2800 ft/sec or 853 m/s), standard temperature (59°F or 15°C) and pressure (750 mmHg or 1000 hPa, and 78% relative humidity). Miller states that these values are taken from the Army Standard Metro but does note that his values are slightly off. He goes on to point out that the difference should be small enough that it can be ignored.

It should also be noted that the bullet density is missing from Miller's formula despite the fact that Miller himself states his formula expands upon Greenhill's. The bullet density in the equation above is implicit in $m$ through the moment of inertia approximation.

Finally, note that the denominator of Miller's formula is based upon the relative shape of a modern bullet. The term $l(1+l^2)$ roughly indicates a shape similar to that of an American football. The fact that s is in the denominator also means that a higher stability factor corresponds with a lower twist rate, i.e. a higher factor implies less stability.

=== Safe values ===
When computing using this formula, Miller suggests several "safe" values that can be used for some of the more difficult to determine variables. For example, he states that a mach number of M = Mach 2.5 (2,790 ft/s; 851 m/s) is a safe value to use for velocity. He also states that rough estimates involving temperature should use s = 2.0.

== Example ==
Using a Nosler Spitzer bullet in a .30-06 Springfield, which is similar to the one pictured above, and substituting values for the variables, we determine the estimated optimum twist rate.

$t = \sqrt{\frac{30m}{d^3l(1+l^2)s}}$

where

- $m = 180$ grains
- $s = 2.0$ (the safe value noted above)
- $d = .308''$
- $l = 1.180'' /0.308'' = 3.83$ calibers

$t = \sqrt{\frac{30 \cdot 180}{2.0 \cdot 0.308^3 \cdot 3.83(1+3.83^2)}} = 39.2$

The result indicates an optimum twist rate of 39.2 calibers per turn. Determining $T$ from $t$ we have

$T = 39.2 \cdot .308'' = 12.1''$

Thus the optimum rate of twist for this bullet should be approximately 12 inches per turn. The typical twist of .30-06 caliber rifle barrels is 10 inches per turn, accommodating heavier bullets than in this example. A different twist rate often helps explain why some bullets work better in certain rifles when fired under similar conditions.

== Comparison to Greenhill's formula ==
Greenhill's formula is much more complicated in full form. The rule of thumb that Greenhill devised based upon his formula is actually what is seen in most writing, including Wikipedia. The rule of thumb is:

$\text{Twist} = \frac{C D^2}{L} \cdot \sqrt{\frac{\text{SG}}{10.9}}$

The actual formula is:

$S_g = \frac{2}{\pi} \frac{I_x^2p^2}{\rho C_{M_\alpha} I_y v^2}$

where

- $S_g$ = gyroscopic stability
- $p$ = twist rate in radians per second
- $I_x$ = polar moment of inertia
- $I_y$ = transverse moment of inertia
- $C_{M_\alpha}$ = pitching moment coefficient
- $\rho$ = air density
- $v$ = velocity

Thus, Miller essentially took Greenhill's rule of thumb and expanded it slightly, while keeping the formula simple enough to be used by someone with basic math skills. To improve on Greenhill, Miller used mostly empirical data and basic geometry.

== Corrective equations ==
=== Miller notes several corrective equations that can be used: ===
The velocity ($v$) correction for twist ($T$): $\sqrt{f_v} = \sqrt[6]{\frac{v}{2800}}$

The velocity ($v$) correction for stability factor ($s$): $f_v = \sqrt[3]{\frac{v}{2800}}$

The altitude ($a$) correction under standard conditions: $f_a = e^{3.158 \cdot 10^{-5} h}$ where $h$ is altitude in feet.

=== Modification for plastic-tipped bullets: ===
Michael W. Courtney & Donald G. Miller developed a new uncorrected stability factor to better estimate the stability of plastic-tipped bullets:

${t}^2 = \frac{30m}{d^3l(1+l^2_m)s}$

and

${l_m} = {L_m}/{d}$

where $L_m$ is the metal of the bullet length in inches and not including the length of the plastic tip.

When solving for Stability:

${s} = \frac{30m}{d^3l(1+l^2_m)t^2}$

or

${s} = \frac{30m}{L(1+L_m^2/d^2)T^2}$

== See also ==
- Rifling
