= Rifling =

Grooves in a weapon barrel for accuracy

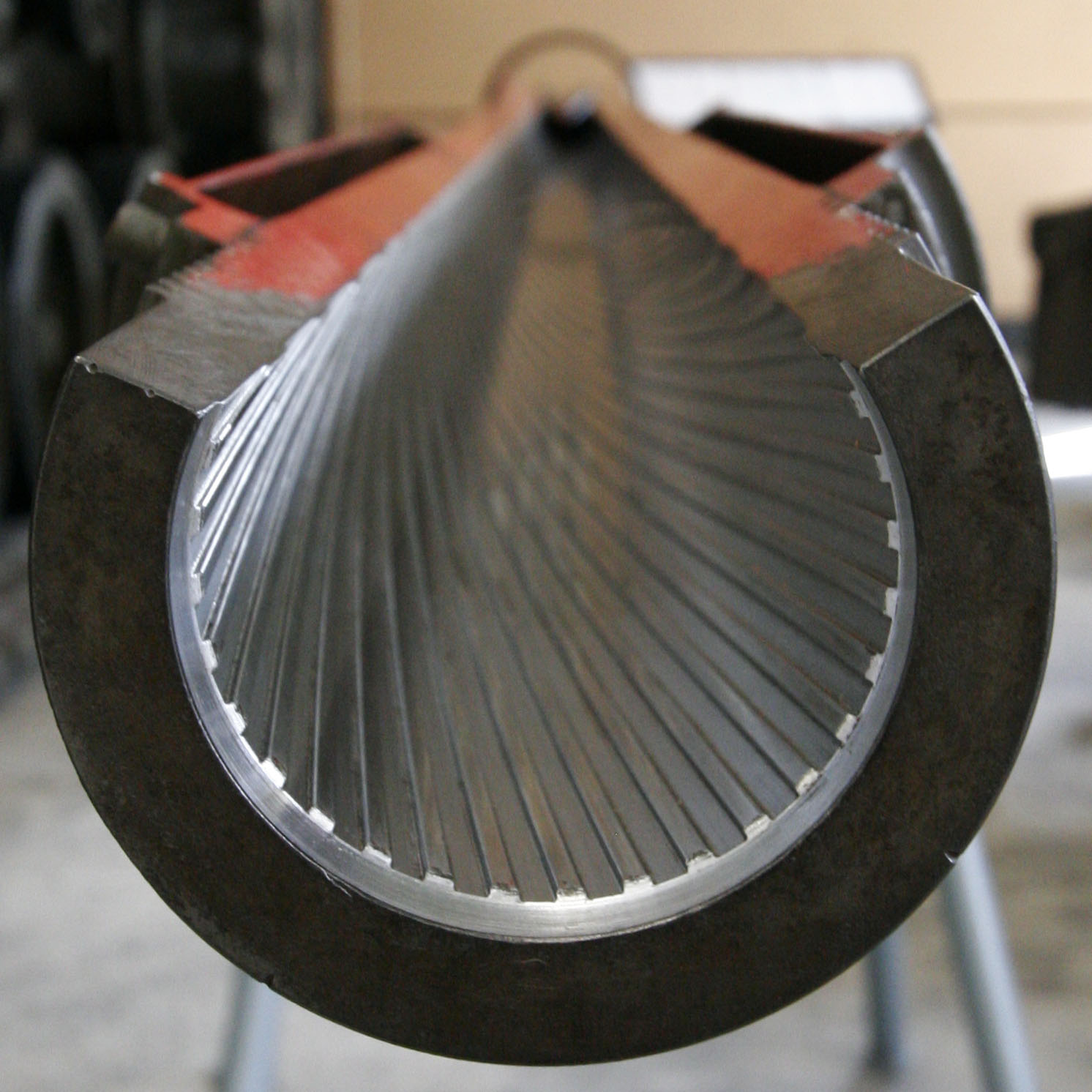
Rifling of a 105 mm Royal Ordnance L7 tank gun

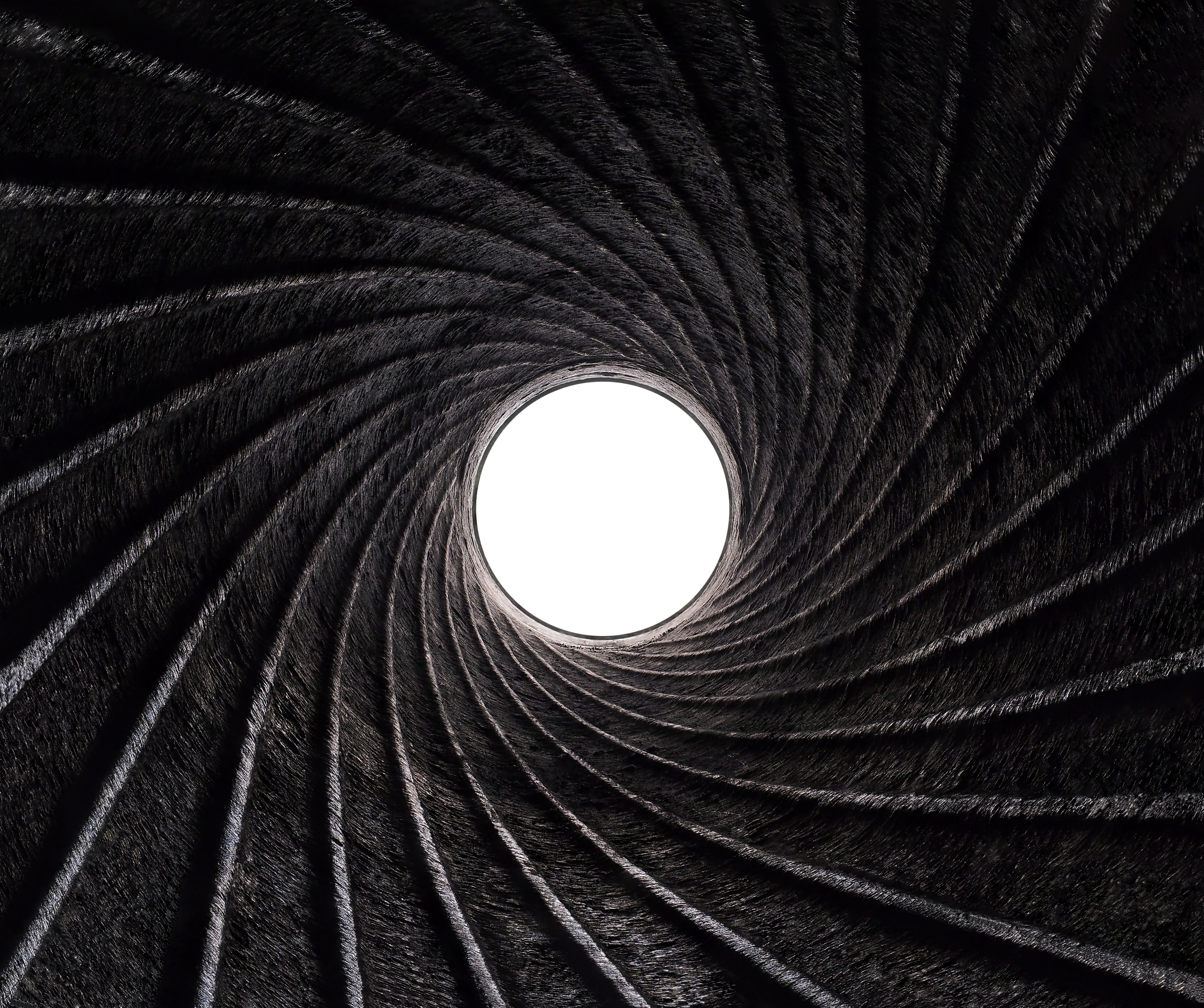
Conventional rifling of a 90 mm M75 cannon (production year 1891, Austria-Hungary)

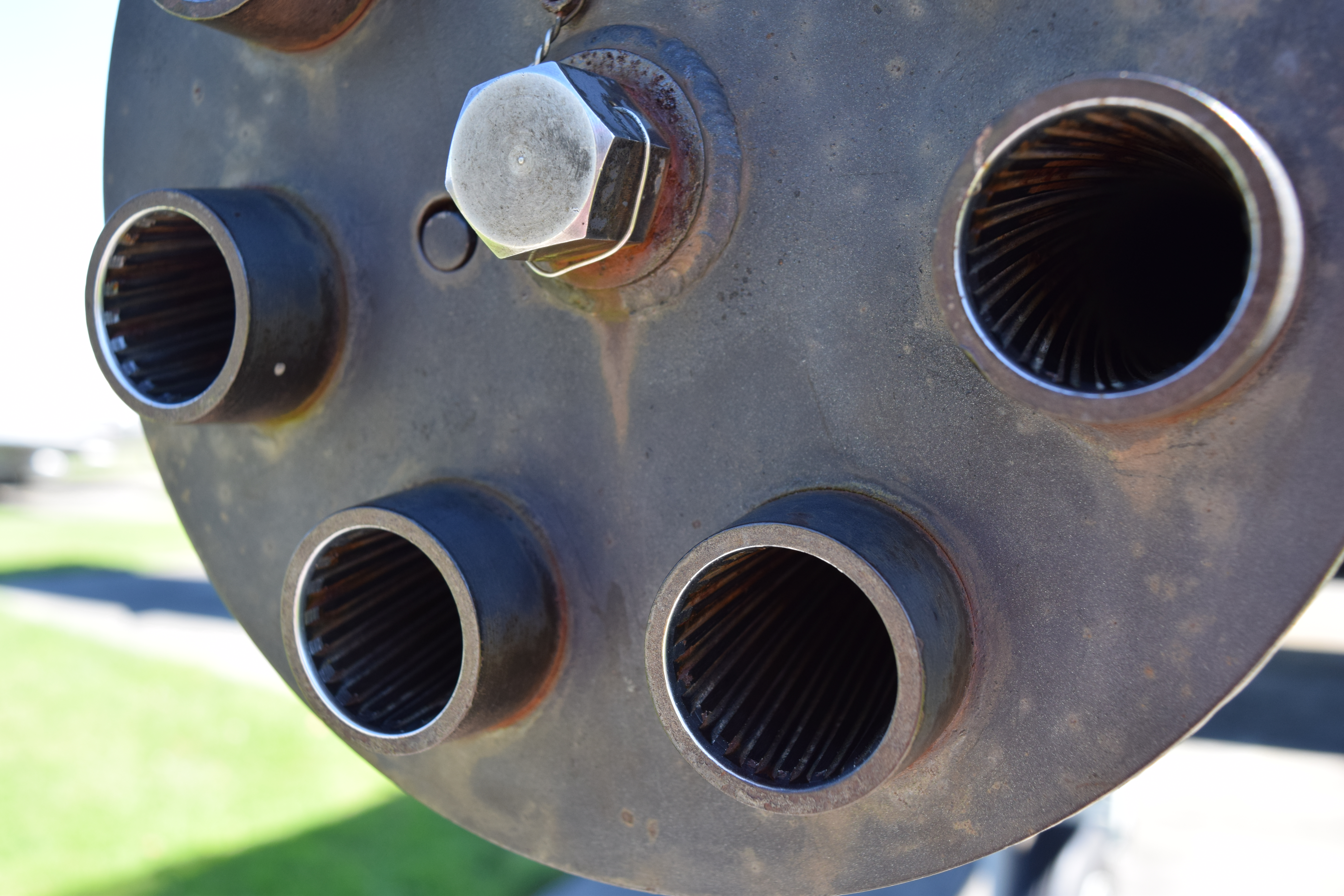
Rifling in a GAU-8 autocannon

Rifling is the term for helical grooves machined into the internal surface of a firearm's barrel for imparting a spin to the fired projectile to improve its aerodynamic stability and accuracy. It is also the term (as a verb) for creating such grooves. Firearms without rifling are called smoothbore.

Rifling is measured by twist rate, the distance the rifling takes to complete one full revolution, expressed as a ratio with 1 as its base (e.g., 1:10 inches (25.4 cm)). A shorter distance/lower ratio indicates a tighter twist, generating a higher spin rate (and greater projectile stability).

The combination of length, weight, and shape of a projectile determines the twist rate needed to gyroscopically stabilize it: barrels intended for short, large-diameter projectiles such as spherical lead balls require a very low twist rate, such as 1 turn in 48 inches (122 cm). Barrels intended for long, small-diameter projectiles, such as the ultra-low-drag 80-grain 0.223 inch bullets (5.2 g, 5.56 mm), use twist rates of 1 turn in 8 inches (20 cm) or faster.

Rifling that increases the twist rate from breech to muzzle is called a gain or progressive twist; a rate which decreases down the length of a barrel is undesirable because it cannot reliably stabilize the projectile as it travels down the bore.

An extremely long projectile, such as a flechette, requires impractically high twist rates to stabilize; it is often stabilized aerodynamically instead. An aerodynamically stabilized projectile can be fired from a smoothbore barrel without a reduction in accuracy.

Rifling is a prominent aspect of the iconic opening sequence of the all the James Bond films.

== History ==
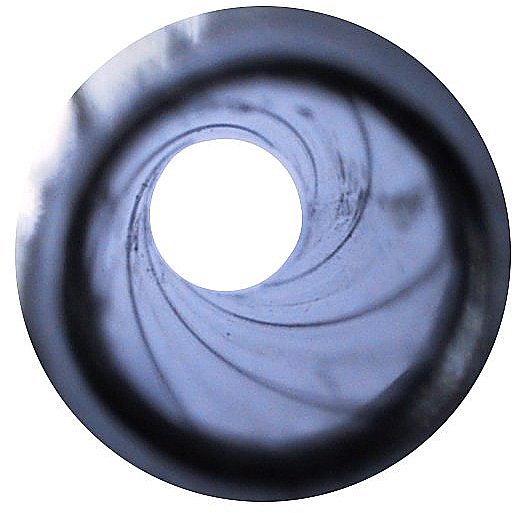
Traditional rifling of a 9 mm handgun barrel

Muskets are smoothbore, large caliber weapons using ball-shaped ammunition fired at relatively low velocity. Due to the high cost, great difficulty of precision manufacturing, and the need to load readily and speedily from the muzzle, musket balls were generally a loose fit in the barrels. Consequently, the balls would often bounce off the sides of the barrel, and their final destination after leaving the muzzle was less predictable. This was countered when accuracy was more important, for example, when hunting, by using a tighter-fitting combination of a closer-to-bore-sized ball and a patch. The accuracy was improved, but it is still not reliable for precision shooting over long distances.

Like the inventor of gunpowder itself, the inventor of barrel rifling is not yet definitively known. Straight grooving had been applied to small arms since at least 1480, originally intended as "soot grooves" to collect gunpowder residue.

Some of the earliest recorded European attempts at spiral-grooved musket barrels were by Gaspard Kollner, a gunsmith of Vienna in 1498, and by Augustus Kotter of Nuremberg in 1520. Some scholars allege that, at the end of the 15th century, Kollner's works used only straight grooves, and that it was not until he received help from Kotter that a working spiral-grooved firearm was made. There may have been attempts even earlier than this, as the main inspiration of rifled firearms came from archers and crossbowmen who realized that their projectiles flew far faster and more accurately when they imparted rotation through twisted fletchings.

Though true rifling dates from the 16th century, it had to be engraved by hand and consequently did not become commonplace until the mid-19th century. Due to the laborious and expensive manufacturing process involved, early rifled firearms were primarily used by wealthy recreational hunters, who did not need to fire their weapons many times in rapid succession and appreciated the increased accuracy. Rifled firearms were not popular with military users since they were difficult to clean, and loading projectiles presented numerous challenges. If the bullet was of sufficient diameter to take up the rifling, a large mallet was required to force it down the bore. If, on the other hand, it was of reduced diameter to assist in its insertion, the bullet would not fully engage the rifling, and accuracy would be reduced.

The first practical military weapons to use rifling with black powder were breech-loaders, such as the Queen Anne pistol.

== Twist rate ==
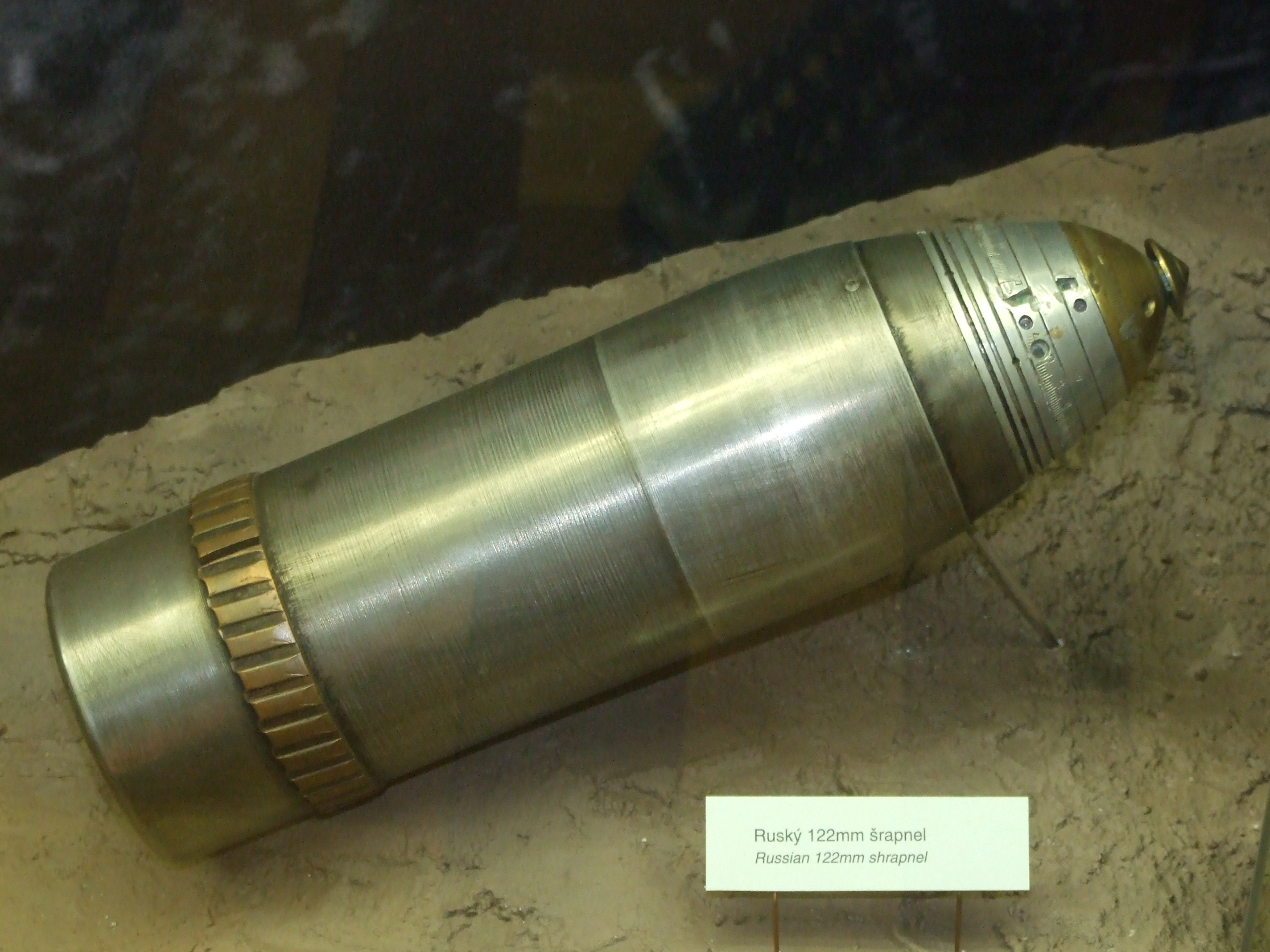
Russian 122 mm shrapnel shell (which has been fired) showing rifling marks on the copper alloy driving band around its base, indicating clockwise spin

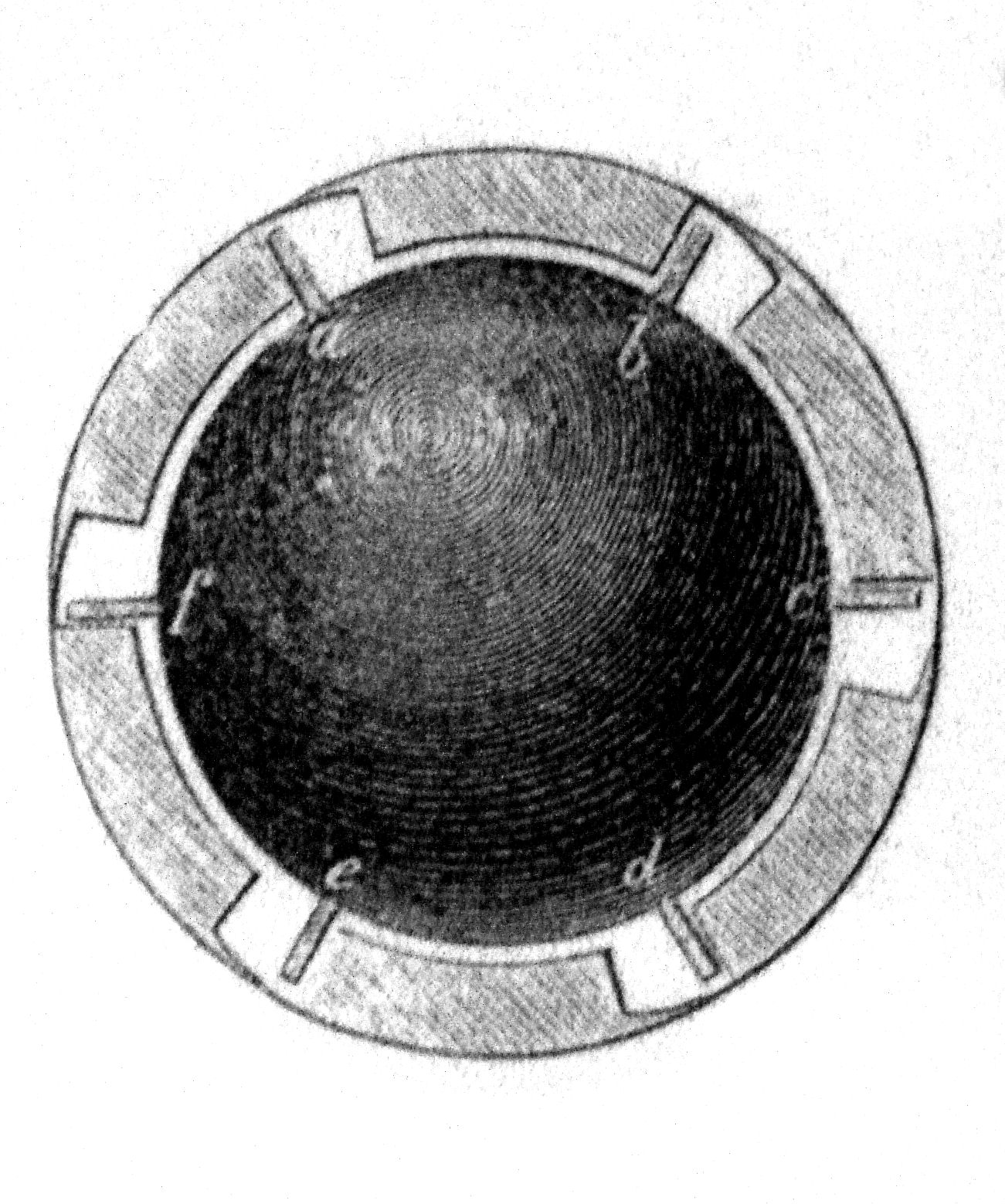
Cannonball equipped with winglets inside the bore of a rifled cannon c. 1860

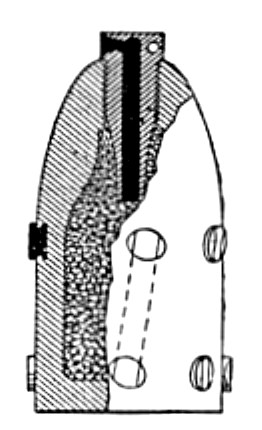
Ogival shell of the La Hitte system, 1858, designed to engage with clockwise rifling

For best performance, the barrel should have a twist rate sufficient to spin-stabilize any bullet that it would reasonably be expected to fire, but not significantly more. Large-diameter bullets provide more stability, as the larger radius provides more gyroscopic inertia. In contrast, long bullets are harder to stabilize, as they tend to be very back-heavy and the aerodynamic pressures have a longer arm ("lever") to act on. The slowest twist rates are found in muzzle-loading firearms meant to fire a round ball; these will have twist rates as low as 1 in 72 inches (180 cm), or slightly longer, although for a typical multi-purpose muzzleloader rifle, a twist rate of 1 in 48 inches (120 cm) is very common. The M16A2 rifle, which is designed to fire the 5.56×45mm NATO SS109 ball and L110 tracer bullets, has a 1 in 7-inch (18 cm) or 32 calibers twist. Civilian AR-15 rifles are commonly found in 1 in 12 inches (30 cm) (54.8 cal) for older rifles and 1 in 9 inches (23 cm) (41.1 cal) for most newer rifles. However, some are made with 1 in 7 inches (18 cm) or 32-caliber twist rates, the same as those used for the M16 rifle. Rifles, which generally fire longer, smaller diameter bullets, will in general have higher twist rates than handguns, which fire shorter, larger diameter bullets.

There are three methods in use to describe the twist rate:

Traditionally, the most common method expresses the twist rate in terms of the 'travel' (length) required to complete one full revolution of the projectile in the rifled barrel. This method does not provide a straightforward understanding of whether a twist rate is relatively slow or fast when comparing bores of different diameters.

The second method describes the 'rifled travel' required to complete one full projectile revolution in calibers or bore diameters:

$$\text{twist} = \frac{L}{D_\text{bore}},$$

where $\text{twist}$ is the twist rate expressed in bore diameters; $L$ is the twist length required to complete one full projectile revolution (in mm or in); and $D_\text{bore}$ is the bore diameter (diameter of the lands, in mm or in).

The twist travel $L$ and the bore diameter $D_\text{bore}$ must be expressed in a consistent unit of measure, i.e. metric (mm) or imperial (in).

The third method simply reports the angle of the grooves relative to the bore axis, measured in degrees.

The latter two methods have the inherent advantage of expressing twist rate as a ratio and provide an easy way to understand whether a twist rate is relatively slow or fast, even when comparing bores of differing diameters.

In 1879, George Greenhill, a professor of mathematics at the Royal Military Academy (RMA) at Woolwich, London, UK developed a rule of thumb for calculating the optimal twist rate for lead-core bullets. This shortcut uses the bullet's length and requires no allowances for weight or nose shape The eponymous Greenhill Formula, still used today, is (in rule of thumb form):

$$\text{twist} = \frac{C D^2}{L} \sqrt{\frac{\mathrm{SG}}{10.9}}$$

where C is 150 (180 for muzzle velocities higher than 2,800 ft/s), D is the bullet's diameter in inches, L is the bullet's length in inches, $\mathrm{SG}$ is the bullet's specific gravity (10.9 for lead-core bullets, which cancels out the second half of the equation). "Twist" is inches per rotation.

The original value of $C$ was 150, which yields a twist rate in inches per turn, when given the diameter $D$ and the length $L$ of the bullet in inches. This works up to velocities of about 840 m/s (2800 ft/s); above those velocities, a $C$ of 180 should be used. For instance, with a velocity of 600 m/s (2000 ft/s), a diameter of 0.5 inches (13 mm) and a length of 1.5 inches (38 mm), the Greenhill formula would give a value of 25, which means 1 turn in 25 inches (640 mm).

Improved formulas for determining stability and twist rates include the Miller Twist Rule and the McGyro program developed by Bill Davis and Robert McCoy.

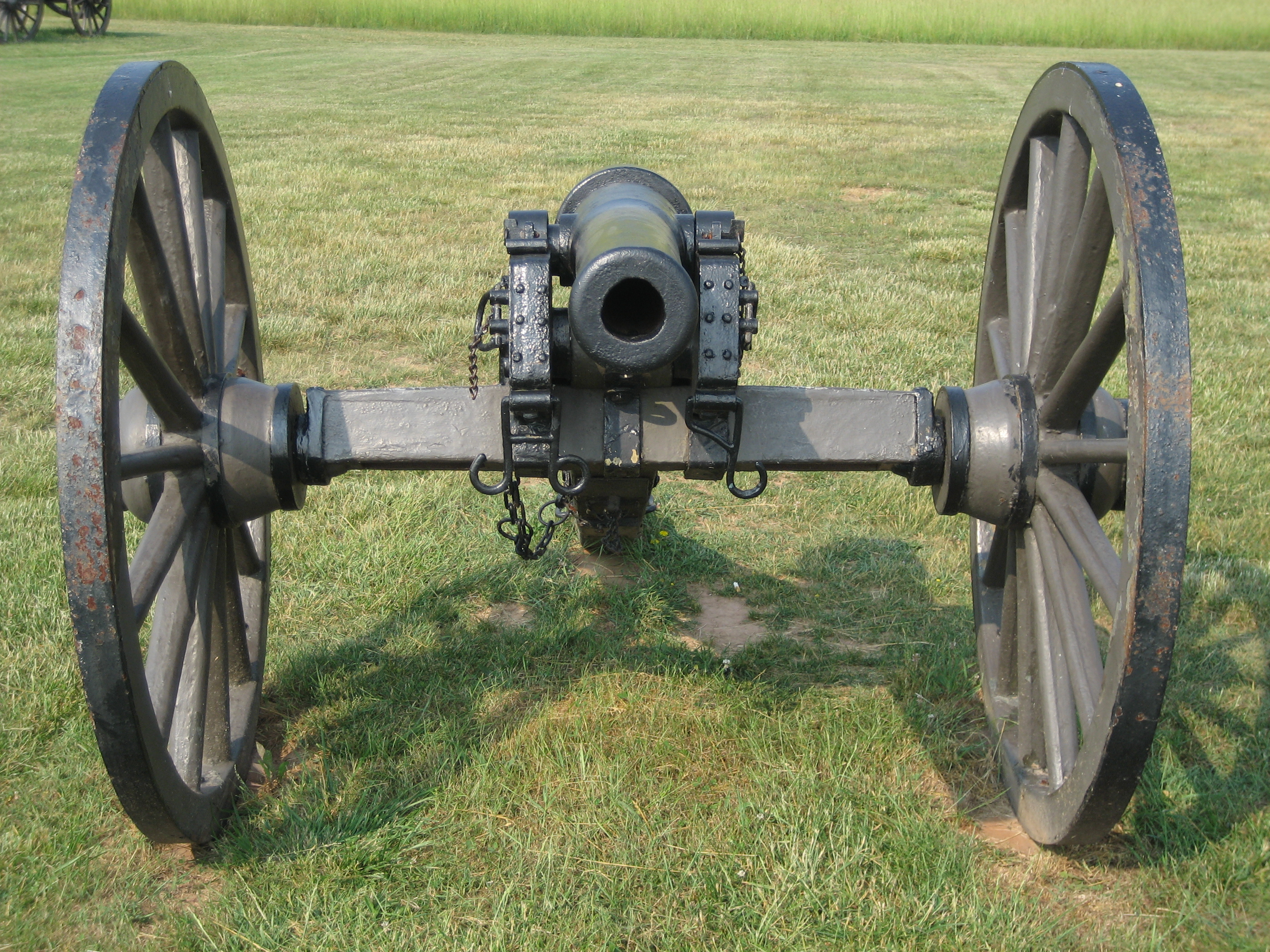
A Parrott rifle, used by both Confederate and Union forces in the American Civil War.

If an insufficient twist rate is used, the bullet will begin to yaw and then tumble; this is usually seen as "keyholing", where bullets leave elongated holes in the target as they strike at an angle. Once the bullet starts to yaw, any hope of accuracy is lost, as the bullet will begin to veer off in random directions as it precesses.

Conversely, a rate of twist that is too high can also cause problems. The excessive twist can cause accelerated barrel wear and, coupled with high velocities, induce a very high spin rate, which can lead to projectile jacket ruptures, causing high-velocity spin-stabilized projectiles to disintegrate in flight. Projectiles made of a single metal cannot practically achieve flight and spin velocities high enough to cause disintegration in flight. Smokeless powder can produce muzzle velocities of approximately 1,600 m/s (5,200 ft/s) for spin stabilized projectiles and more advanced propellants used in smoothbore tank guns can produce muzzle velocities of approximately 1,800 m/s (5,900 ft/s). A higher twist than needed can also cause more subtle problems with accuracy; any inconsistency within the bullet, such as a void that causes an unequal distribution of mass, may be magnified by the spin. Undersized bullets also have problems, as they may not enter the rifling exactly concentric and coaxial to the bore, and excess twist will exacerbate the accuracy problems this causes.

A bullet fired from a rifled barrel can spin at over 300,000 rpm (5 kHz), depending on the bullet's muzzle velocity and the barrel's twist rate.

The general definition of the spin $S$ of an object rotating around a single axis can be written as:

$$S = \frac{\upsilon}{C}$$

where $\upsilon$ is the linear velocity of a point in the rotating object (in units of distance/time) and $C$ refers to the circumference of the circle that this measuring point performs around the axis of rotation.

A bullet that matches the rifling of the firing barrel will exit that barrel with a spin:

$$S = \frac{\upsilon_0}{L}$$
where $\upsilon_0$ is the muzzle velocity and $L$ is the twist rate.

For example, an M4 Carbine with a twist rate of 1 in 7 inches (177.8 mm) and a muzzle velocity of 3,050 feet per second (930 m/s) will give the bullet a spin of 930 m/s / 0.1778 m ≈ 5.230 kHz (313,835 rpm).

Excessive rotational speed can exceed the bullet's designed limits, and the resulting centrifugal force can cause the bullet to disintegrate radially during flight.

== Design ==
A barrel of circular bore cross-section is not capable of imparting a spin to a projectile, so a rifled barrel has a non-circular cross-section. Typically, the rifled barrel contains one or more grooves that run down its length, giving it a cross-section resembling an internal gear. However, it can also take the shape of a polygon, usually with rounded corners. Since the barrel is not circular in cross-section, it cannot be accurately described with a single diameter. Rifled bores may be described by the bore diameter or land diameter (the diameter between lands or high points in the rifling), or by groove diameter (the diameter between grooves or low points in the rifling). Differences in naming conventions for cartridges can confuse; for example, the projectiles of the .303 British are actually slightly larger in diameter than the projectiles of the .308 Winchester, because the ".303" refers to the bore diameter in inches (bullet is .312), while the ".308" refers to the bullet diameter in inches (7.92 mm and 7.82 mm, respectively).

Despite differences in form, the common goal of rifling is to deliver the projectile accurately to the target. In addition to imparting spin to the bullet, the barrel must hold the projectile securely and concentrically as it travels down the barrel. This requires that the rifling meet several tasks:

- It must be sized so that the projectile will swage or obturate upon firing to fill the bore.
- The diameter should be consistent, and must not increase towards the muzzle.
- The rifling should be consistent down the length of the bore, without changes in cross-section, such as variations in groove width or spacing.
- It should be smooth, with no scratches lying perpendicular to the bore, so it does not abrade material from the projectile.
- The chamber and crown must smoothly transition the projectile into and out of the rifling.

Rifling may not begin immediately forward of the chamber. There may be an unrifled throat ahead of the chamber, so a cartridge may be chambered without pushing the bullet into the rifling. This reduces the force required to load a cartridge into the chamber and prevents a bullet from being left stuck in the rifling when an unfired cartridge is removed from the chamber. The specified diameter of the throat may be somewhat greater than the groove diameter, and may be enlarged by use if hot powder gas melts the interior barrel surface when the rifle is fired. Freebore is a groove-diameter length of smoothbore barrel without lands forward of the throat. Freebore allows the bullet to transition from static friction to sliding friction and gain linear momentum before encountering the resistance of increasing rotational momentum. Freebore may allow more effective use of propellants by reducing the initial pressure peak during the minimum volume phase of internal ballistics before the bullet starts moving down the barrel. Barrels with freebore length exceeding the rifled length have been known by a variety of trade names, including paradox.

== Manufacture ==
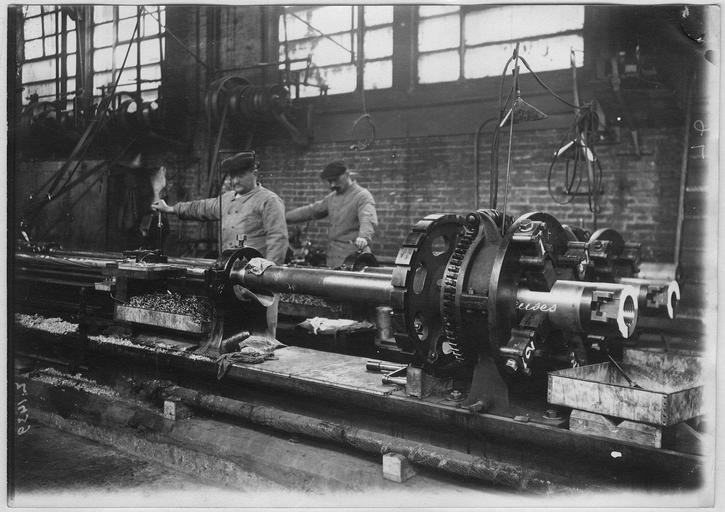
Rifling a 75-mm gun barrel during WWI

An early method of introducing rifling to a pre-drilled barrel was to use a cutter mounted on a square-section rod, accurately twisted into a spiral of the desired pitch, mounted in two fixed square-section holes. As the cutter was advanced through the barrel, it twisted at a uniform rate governed by the pitch. The first cut was shallow. The cutter points were gradually expanded with repeated cuts. The blades were in slots in a wooden dowel, and the slots were gradually packed with slips of paper until the required depth was obtained. The process was finished off by casting a slug of molten lead inside the barrel, withdrawing it, and using it with a paste of emery and oil to smooth the bore.

Most rifling is created by either:

- Cutting one groove at a time with a tool (cut rifling or single point cut rifling);
- Cutting all grooves in one pass with a special progressive broaching bit (broached rifling);
- Pressing all grooves at once with a tool called a "button" that is pushed or pulled down the barrel (button rifling);
- Forging the barrel over a mandrel containing a reverse image of the rifling, and often the chamber as well (hammer forging);
- Flow forming the barrel preform over a mandrel containing a reverse image of the rifling (rifling by flow forming)
- Using non-contact forces such as chemical reaction or heat from laser source to etch the rifling pattern (etched rifling)
- Machining the rifling grooves texture on a thin metal plate, then folding the plate into the inner bore of the barrel (liner rifling)

The grooves are the spaces that are cut out, and the resulting ridges are called lands. These lands and grooves can vary in number, depth, shape, direction of twist (right or left), and twist rate. The spin imparted by rifling significantly improves the stability of the projectile, improving both range and accuracy. Typically, rifling is a constant rate down the barrel, usually measured by the length of travel required to produce a single turn. Occasionally, firearms are encountered with a gain twist, where the rate of spin increases from chamber to muzzle. While intentional gain twists are rare, slight gain twists due to manufacturing variance are, in fact, fairly common. Since a reduction in twist rate is very detrimental to accuracy, gunsmiths who are machining a new barrel from a rifled blank will often measure the twist carefully so they may put the faster rate, no matter how minute the difference is, at the muzzle end.

== Projectiles ==
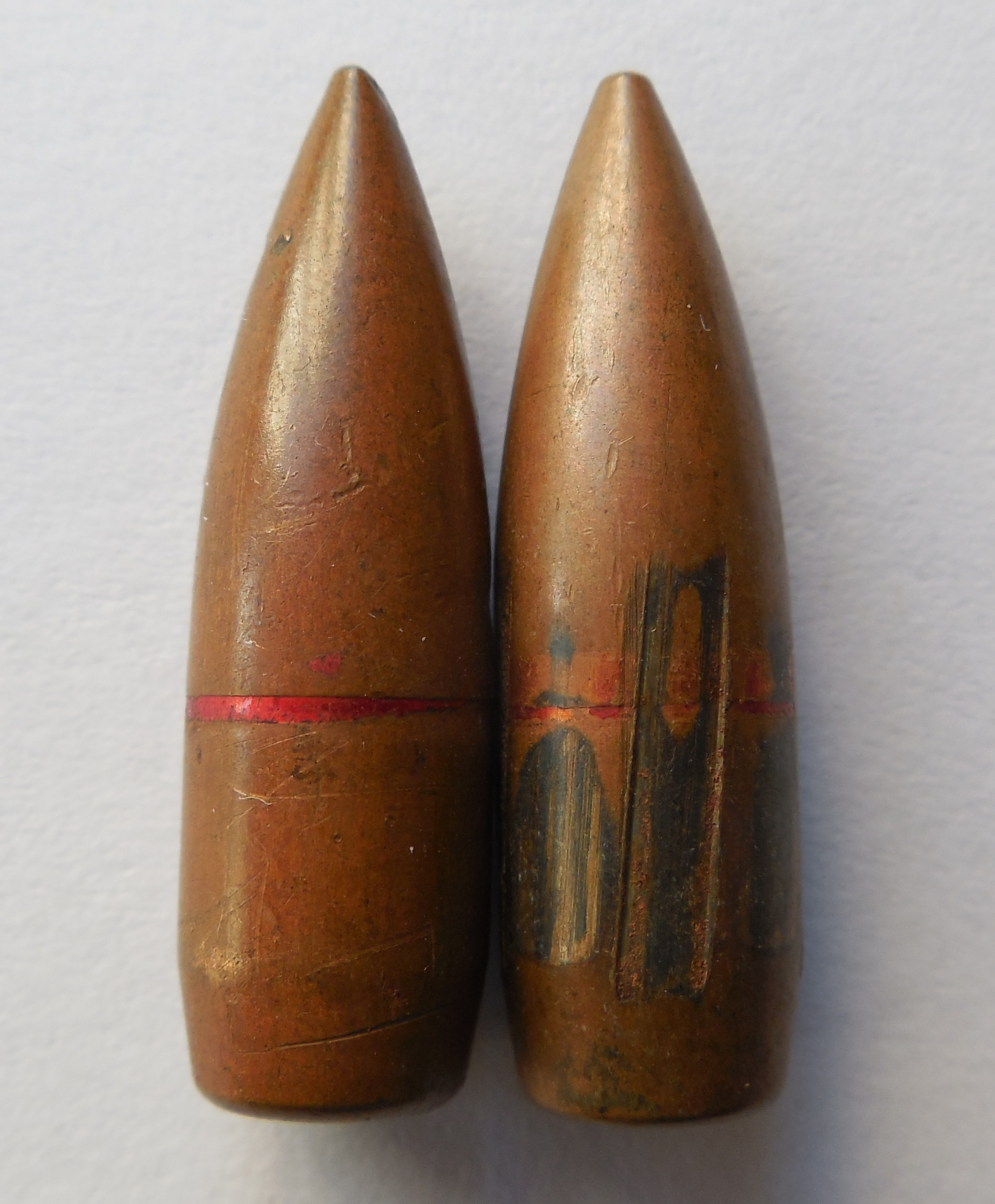
57-N-231 standard 7.62×39mm military bullets with steel core - the one on the left is unfired, the one on the right is fired, with the rifling grooves visible. Notice the copper wash scraped off and the steel jacket is exposed on the groove marks

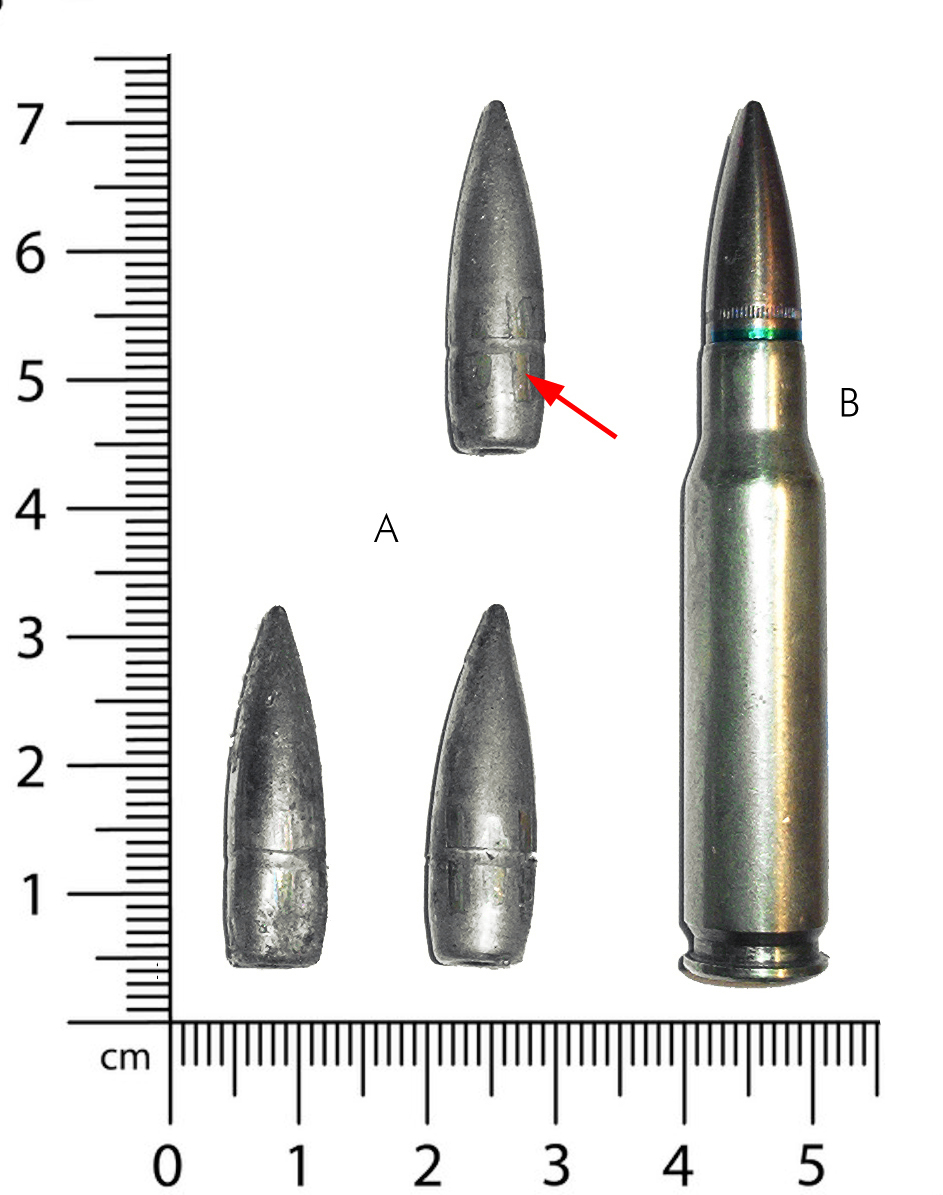
Three recovered 7.62×51mm NATO bullets (next to an unfired cartridge), showing rifling marks imparting anti-clockwise spin

The original firearms were loaded from the muzzle by forcing a ball from the muzzle to the chamber. Whether using a rifled or smooth bore, a good fit was needed to seal the bore and provide the best possible accuracy from the gun. To ease the force required to load the projectile, these early guns used an undersized ball, and a patch made of cloth, paper, or leather to fill the windage (the gap between the ball and the walls of the bore). The patch acted as a wadding, provided some degree of pressure sealing, kept the ball seated on the charge of black powder, and kept the ball concentric with the bore. In rifled barrels, the patch also provided a means to transfer the spin from the rifling to the bullet, as the patch is engaged rather than the ball. Until the advent of the hollow-based Minié ball, which expands and obturates upon firing to seal the bore and engage the rifling, the patch provided the best means of getting the projectile to engage the rifling.

In breech-loading firearms, the task of seating the projectile into the rifling is handled by the throat of the chamber. Next is the freebore, which is the portion of the throat down which the projectile travels before the rifling starts. The last section of the throat is the throat angle, where the throat transitions into the rifled barrel.

The throat is usually sized slightly larger than the projectile, so that the loaded cartridge can be inserted and removed easily, but the throat should be as close as practical to the groove diameter of the barrel. Upon firing, the projectile expands under the pressure from the chamber and obturates to fit the throat. The bullet then travels down the throat and engages the rifling, where it is engraved, and begins to spin. Engraving the projectile requires significant force, and in some firearms, the substantial freebore helps keep chamber pressures low by allowing the propellant gases to expand before they are required to engrave the projectile. Minimizing freebore improves accuracy by reducing the likelihood that a projectile will deform before entering the rifling.

When the projectile is swaged into the rifling, it takes on a mirror image of the rifling as the lands push into the projectile in a process called engraving. Engraving captures not only the major features of the bore, such as the lands and grooves, but also minor features, such as scratches and tool marks. The relationship between the bore characteristics and the engraving on the projectile is often used in forensic ballistics.

Deep-cut groove rifling barrels can be found in automatic firearms to deliberately ease out the gas pressure (although it can affect their velocity), thereby surpassing the projectile. The Heckler & Koch VP70 is an example that uses this to ease pressure on the pistol slide.

== Recent developments ==
Conventional rifling (left) and polygonal rifling (right). Both types of rifling use a spiraling pattern

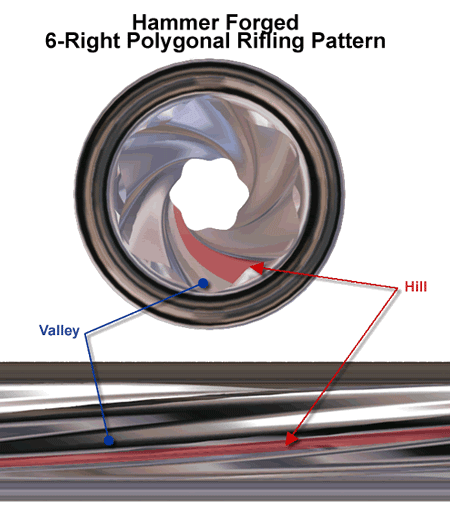
The spiraling pattern (here with polygonal rifling) is shown

The grooves most commonly used in modern rifling have fairly sharp edges. More recently, polygonal rifling, a throwback to the earliest types of rifling, has become popular, especially in handguns. Polygonal barrels tend to have longer service lives because the reduction of the sharp edges of the land (the grooves are the spaces that are cut out, and the resulting ridges are called lands) reduces erosion of the barrel. Supporters of polygonal rifling also claim higher velocities and greater accuracy. Polygonal rifling is currently seen on pistols from CZ, Heckler & Koch, Glock, Tanfoglio, and the Kahr Arms (P series only), as well as the Desert Eagle.

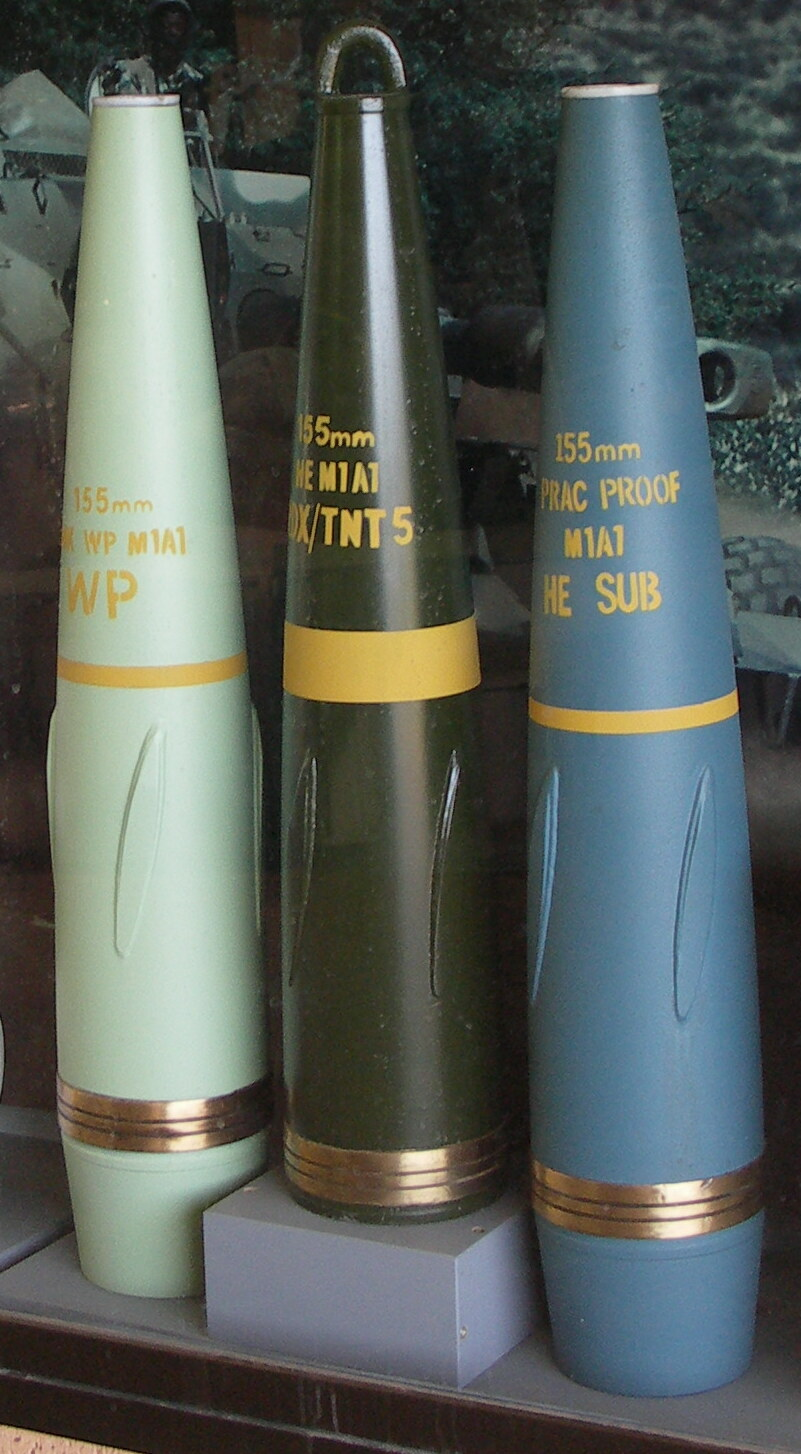

For field artillery pieces, the extended range, full bore (ERFB) concept developed in early 1970s by Dennis Hyatt Jenkins and Luis Palacio of Gerald Bull's Space Research Corporation for the GC-45 howitzer replaces the bourrelet with small nubs, which both tightly fit into lands of the barrel. Guns capable of firing these projectiles have achieved significant increases in range, but this is compensated with a significantly (3–4 times) decreased accuracy, due to which they were not adopted by NATO militaries. Unlike a shell narrower than the gun's bore with a sabot, ERFB shells use the full bore, permitting a larger payload. Examples include the South African G5 and the German PzH 2000. ERFB may be combined with base bleed.

== Variable pitch rifling ==
A gain-twist or progressive rifling begins with a slow twist rate that gradually increases down the bore, resulting in very little initial change in the projectile's angular momentum during the first few inches of bullet travel after it enters the throat. This enables the bullet to remain essentially undisturbed and true to the case mouth. After engaging the rifling at the throat, the bullet is progressively subjected to accelerated angular momentum as it is propelled down the barrel. The theoretical advantage is that by gradually increasing the spin rate, torque is imparted along a much longer bore length, allowing thermomechanical stress to be spread over a larger area rather than being focused predominantly at the throat, which typically wears out much faster than other parts of the barrel. Gain-twist rifling was used before and during the American Civil War (1861–65). Colt Army and Navy revolvers both employed gain-twist rifling. Gain-twist rifling, however, is more difficult to produce than uniform rifling and, therefore, is more expensive. The military has used gain-twist rifling in a variety of weapons, such as the 20 mm M61 Vulcan Gatling gun used in some current fighter jets and the larger 30 mm GAU-8 Avenger Gatling gun used in the A10 Thunderbolt II close air support jet. In these applications, it enables lighter barrel construction by reducing chamber pressures through low initial twist rates while ensuring the projectiles have sufficient stability once they leave the barrel. It is seldom used in commercially available products, though notably on the Smith & Wesson Model 460 (X-treme Velocity Revolver).

== See also ==
- Paradox gun
- Rifled musket
- Comparison microscope
- Gun barrel sequence
- Greenhill formula
- Glossary of firearms terminology
- Miller twist rate
